= List of animals of Long Island Sound =

Long Island Sound is a large marine estuary in the Northeastern United States. It forms the maritime border between the states of New York and Connecticut. It is diverse and serves as a breeding ground to many different types of marine animal species; the following is a list of said species by scientific and/or common name. Marine mammals are excluded; see List of mammals of New York for the corresponding species.

== Sponges (Porifera) ==
- Clathria prolifera (red beard sponge)
- Cliona celata (boring sponge)
- Halichondria bowerbanki (yellow sun sponge)
- Halichondria panicea (breadcrumb sponge)
- Chalinula loosanoffi (erect sponge)
- Haliclona oculata (mermaid's glove)
- Isodictya palmata (finger sponge)
- Polymastia robusta

== Comb jellies (Ctenophora) ==
- Pleurobrachia pileus (sea gooseberry)

== Jellyfishes (Cnidaria: Medusozoa) ==
- Aurelia aurita (moon jelly)
- Chrysaora quinquecirrha (Atlantic sea nettle)
- Cyanea capillata (lion's mane jellyfish)
- Physalia physalis (Portuguese man o'war)

== Corals (Cnidaria: Alcyonacea and Scleractinia) ==
- Alcyonium digitatum (dead man's fingers coral)
- Astrangia poculata (northern star coral)

== Sea anemones (Cnidaria: Actiniaria) ==
- Ceriantheopsis americana (American striped burrowing anemone; invasive species)
- Cerianthus borealis (northern burrowing anemone)
- Diadumene leucolena (ghost anemone)
- Diadumene lineata (orange-striped green anemone)
- Fagesia lineata (lined anemone)
- Metridium senile (frilled anemone)
- Urticina felina (northern red anemone)

== Crustaceans (Arthropoda: Crustacea) ==
=== True crabs (Decapoda: Brachyura) ===
- Callinectes sapidus (Atlantic blue crab)
- Cancer borealis (Jonah crab)
- Cancer irroratus (Atlantic rock crab)
- Carcinus maenas (European green crab; invasive species)
- Hemigrapsus sanguineus (Asian shore crab; invasive species)
- Libinia emarginata (common spider crab)
- Libinia dubia (longnose spider crab)
- Ovalipes ocellatus (lady crab)
- Pelia mutica (cryptic teardrop crab)
- Sesarma reticulatum (marsh crab)
- Uca pugilator (Atlantic sand fiddler crab)
- Uca pugnax (Atlantic marsh fiddler crab)

=== Other decapods ===
- Crangon septemspinosa (seven-spined sand shrimp)
- Gilvossius setimanus (ghost shrimp)
- Homarus americanus (American lobster)
- Pagurus longicarpus (long-wrist hermit crab)
- Pagurus pollicaris (flatclaw hermit crab)
- Palaemonetes pugio (daggerblade grass shrimp)
- Upogebia affinis (coastal mud shrimp)

=== Mantis shrimp (Stomatopoda) ===
- Squilla empusa (Atlantic mantis shrimp)

== Horseshoe crabs (Arthropoda: Xiphosura) ==
- Limulus polyphemus (Atlantic horseshoe crab)

== Cephalopods (Mollusca: Cephalopoda) ==
- Illex illecebrosus (northern shortfin squid)
- Loligo pealei (longfin inshore squid)

== Gastropods (Mollusca: Gastropoda) ==
=== Littorinimorpha ===
This group includes filter feeders, omnivores, and predatory sea snails.

- Crepidula fornicata (common slipper shell snail)
- Crepidula plana (eastern white slipper shell)
- Euspira heros (northern moonsnail)
- Euspira triseriata (spotted moonsnail)
- Littorina littorea (common periwinkle; invasive species)
- Littorina saxatilis (rough periwinkle)
- Neverita duplicata (sharkeye moonsnail)

=== Neogastropoda ===
Most neogastropods are predatory sea snails.

- Astyris lunata (lunar dovesnail)
- Buccinum undatum (waved whelk)
- Busycon carica (knobbed whelk)
- Busycotypus canaliculatus (channeled whelk)
- Eupleura caudata (thick-lip drill)
- Ilyanassa obsoleta (eastern mudsnail)
- Ilyanassa trivittata (threeline mudsnail)
- Kurtziella cerina (wax-colored mangelia)
- Nucella lapillus (Atlantic dogwinkle)
- Phrontis vibex (bruised nassa)
- Urosalpinx cinerea (Atlantic oyster drill)

=== Ptenoglossa ===
- Cerithiopsis greenii (Green's cerith)
- Retilaskeya emersonii (awl cerith)
- Seila adamsii (Adam's cerith)

== Bivalves (Mollusca: Bivalvia) ==
=== Pteriomorphia ===
These filter feeders are either mobile or permanently attached to a substrate.

- Anadara ovalis (blood ark)
- Anadara transversa (transverse ark)
- Anomia simplex (jingle shell)
- Argopecten irradians (bay scallop)
- Crassostrea virginica (eastern oyster)
- Geukensia demissa (ribbed mussel)
- Modiolus modiolus (northern horsemussel)
- Mytilus edulis (blue mussel)
- Ostrea edulis (European flat oyster)
- Placopecten magellanicus (sea scallop)

=== Heterodonta ===
These filter feeders are mostly burrowers.

- Arctica islandica (ocean quahog)
- Astarte castanea (smooth astarte)
- Astarte undata (wavy astarte)
- Ensis directus (Atlantic jackknife / razor clam)
- Mercenaria mercenaria (northern quahog / hardshell clam)
- Mulinia lateralis (dwarf surf clam)
- Mya arenaria (softshell clam)
- Petricola pholadiformis (false angelwing)
- Pitar morrhuanus (false quahog)
- Spisula solidissima (Atlantic surf clam)

== Echinoderms (Echinodermata) ==
=== Sea urchins (Echinoidea) ===
- Arbacia punctulata (Atlantic purple sea urchin)
- Order Clypeasteroida (sand dollars)
- Strongylocentrotus droebachiensis (common green sea urchin)

=== Sea cucumbers (Holothuroidea) ===
- Sclerodactyla briareus (hairy sea cucumber)

=== Starfish (Asteroidea) ===
- Asterias forbesi (common seastar)
- Asterias vulgaris (northern seastar)
- Crossaster papposus (spiny sunstar)
- Henricia sanguinolenta (blood star)
- Hippasteria phrygiana (horse star)
- Leptasterias tenera (slender sea star)
- Pteraster militaris (winged sea star)
- Solaster endeca (purple sunstar)

=== Brittle stars (Ophiuroidea) ===
- Aamphioplus abditus (burrowing brittlestar)
- Axiognathus squamata (little brittlestar)
- Gorgonocephalus arcticus (northern basketstar)
- Ophioderma brevispinum (shortspined brittlestar)
- Ophiopholis aculeata (daisy brittlestar)

== Sea squirts (Chordata: Tunicata) ==
- Botrylloides violaceus (compound tunicate)
- Botryllus schlosseri (golden star tunicate)
- Didemnum spp.
- Molgula manhattensis (sea grape)
- Styela clava (Asian stalked tunicate)

== Cartilaginous fish (Chordata: Chondrichthyes) ==
=== Sharks (Selachimorpha) ===
==== Resident sharks ====
- Carcharhinus leucas (bull shark)
- Carcharhinus plumbeus (sandbar shark)
- Mustelus canis (dusky smoothhound shark / smooth dogfish)
- Odontaspis taurus (sand tiger shark)
- Squalus acanthias (spiny dogfish)

==== Vagrant sharks ====
- Alopias vulpinus (common thresher shark)
- Carcharhinus obscurus (dusky shark)
- Carcharodon carcharias (great white shark)
- Prionace glauca (blue shark)
- Sphyrna zygaena (smooth hammerhead shark)

=== Skates and rays (Batoidea) ===
- Dasyatis centroura (roughtail stingray)
- Dipturus laevis (barndoor skate)
- Leucoraja ocellata (winter skate)
- Raja eglanteria (clearnose skate)
- Raja erinacea (little skate)
- Rhinoptera bonasus (cownose ray)
- Torpedo nobiliana (Atlantic torpedo)

== Bony fish (Chordata: Osteichthyes) ==
=== Eels (Anguilliformes) ===
- Anguilla rostrata (American eel)

=== Cod and allies (Gadiformes) ===
- Enchelyopus cimbrius (four-bearded rockling)
- Microgadus tomcod (Atlantic tomcod)
- Urophycis chuss (red hake)

=== Seahorses and pipefishes (Syngnathidae) ===
- Hippocampus erectus (northern lined seahorse)
- Syngnathus fuscus (northern pipefish)

=== Jacks (Carangidae) ===
- Carangoides bartholomaei (yellow jack, coolihoo)
- Caranx crysos (blue runner, hardnose)
- Caranx hippos (crevalle jack, jack crevalle, common jack)
- Chloroscombrus chrysurus (Atlantic bumper)
- Selene vomer (lookdown)

=== Flatfish (Pleuronectiformes) ===
- Etropus microstomus (smallmouth flounder)
- Paralichthys dentatus (fluke)
- Pleuronectes ferruginea (yellowtail flounder)
- Pseudopleuronectes americanus (winter flounder)
- Scophthalmus aquosus (windowpane flounder)
- Trinectes maculatus (hogchoker)

=== Scorpaeniformes ===
- Hemitripterus americanus (Atlantic sea raven)
- Myoxocephalus aenaeus (grubby sculpin)
- Myoxocephalus octodecemspinosus (longhorn sculpin)
- Prionotus carolinus (northern sea robin)
- Prionotus evolans (striped sea robin)
- Pterois volitans (red lionfish; invasive species)

=== Zoarcoidei ===
- Anarhichas lupus (Atlantic wolffish)
- Pholis gunnellus (rock gunnel)
- Ulvaria subbifurcata (radiated shanny)

=== Wrasses (Labridae) ===
- Tautoga onitis (blackfish, tautog)
- Tautogolabrus adspersus (cunner wrasse, bergall)

=== Drums (Sciaenidae) ===
- Cynoscion regalis (weakfish, seatrout)
- Leiostomus xanthurus (spot, spot croaker)
- Menticirrhus saxatilis (northern kingfish, northern kingcroaker, whiting)
- Micropogonias undulatus (Atlantic croaker)
- Pogonias cromis (black drum, big ugly, drum, drummer)
- Sciaenops ocellatus (red drum, redfish, puppy drum, channel bass, red, spottail bass)

=== Breams and Porgies (Sparidae) ===
- Archosargus probatocephalus (sheephead)
- Stenotomus chrysops (scup)

=== Anglerfish (Lophiiformes) ===
- Chaetodipterus faber (Atlantic spadefish)
- Dibranchus atlanticus (Atlantic batfish)
- Lophius americanus (American anglerfish)

=== Tetraodontiformes ===
All of the animals in this category are summer visitors, who migrate northwards from warmer waters in the south.

- Balistes capriscus (gray triggerfish)
- Chilomycterus schoepfii (striped burrfish)
- Mola mola (ocean sunfish)
- Sphoeroides maculatus (northern pufferfish)
- Stephanolepis hispidus (planehead filefish)

=== Miscellaneous Percomorpha ===
- Ammodytes americanus (American sand lance)
- Apeltes quadracus (four-spined stickleback; found in fresh and brackish water)
- Centropristis striata (black sea bass)
- Fundulus majalis (striped killifish)
- Menidia menidia (Atlantic silverside)
- Morone saxatilis (striped bass)
- Opsanus tau (oyster toadfish)
- Peprilus triacanthus (Atlantic butterfish, American butterfish)
- Pomatomus saltatrix (bluefish)

== Gulf Stream strays ==
Mainly all the animals in this category are juveniles carried via the Gulf Stream to the sound and end up dying when the water temperature cools.

- Acanthostracion quadricornis (scrawled cowfish)
- Aluterus scriptus (scrawled filefish)
- Balistes vetula (queen triggerfish)
- Chaetodon ocellatus (spotfin butterflyfish)
- Fistularia tabacaria (bluespotted cornetfish)
- Histrio histrio (sargassum fish)
- Holacanthus bermudensis (Bermuda blue angelfish)
- Hyporthodus niveatus (snowy grouper)
- Megalops atlanticus (Atlantic tarpon)
- Pomacanthus paru (French angelfish)
- Scorpaena plumieri (spotted scorpionfish)
