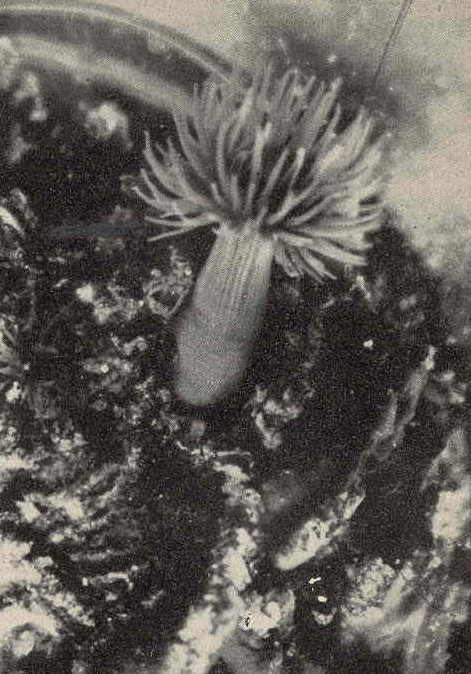

Scientific classification
- Kingdom: Animalia
- Phylum: Cnidaria
- Subphylum: Anthozoa
- Class: Hexacorallia
- Order: Actiniaria
- Family: Diadumenidae
- Genus: Diadumene
- Species: D. leucolena

Binomial name
- Diadumene leucolena (Verrill, 1866)

Synonyms
- Cylista leuconela (Verrill, 1866); Cylista levolena; Diadumene leucolens; Diadumine leucolena; Sagartia leucolena Verrill, 1866

= Diadumene leucolena =

Species of sea anemone

Diadumene leucolena, commonly known as the white anemone or ghost anemone, is a species of sea anemone in the family Diadumenidae. It is an inconspicuous species found in the intertidal and subtidal areas of the northeastern Atlantic Ocean, the Caribbean Sea and the northern Pacific Ocean. Diadumene, "diadem-bearer", referring to the crown of tentacles, is a female form intended to bring to mind the Diadumenos, the renowned Greek sculpture of an athlete crowning himself with the victor's ribbon diadem.

== Description ==
When fully extended, Diadumene leucolena has a long and slender column, being up to 38 mm (1.5 in) tall and 12 mm (0.5 in) wide. Both column and tentacles are a translucent pale pink or flesh-colour, the column sometimes having a faint green tinge near the top. The column appears to be smooth but close inspection shows irregularly arranged darker swellings. The tentacles closest to either end of the mouth have yellow bases.

== Distribution ==
D. leucolena is found in the North Atlantic Ocean and the Caribbean Sea, and the North Pacific Ocean. This is a shallow water species occurring in bays and areas of low salinity, on stones, on the shells of live oysters and on man-made structures such as pilings and floats.

== Biology ==
D. leucolena reproduces sexually, males and females liberating their gametes into the sea. The fertilised eggs develop into planula larvae which disperse, settle on the seabed, undergo metamorphosis and develop into new individuals.

The closely related species, Diadumene lineata, (previously known as Haliplanella luciae) is a sympatric species of sea anemone living in the same habitats in the same localities. Unlike D. leucolena, it reproduces exclusively by asexual means, resulting in populations consisting almost entirely of cloned individuals. D. lineata has a tendency to thrive for a time, and then unexpectedly disappear from a locality. D. leucolena on the other hand, living in the same localities and conditions, has stable populations. It is hypothesized that sexual reproduction in the latter gives genetic variability and the flexibility to cope with adverse circumstances, while the asexually-breeding D. lineata, with hardly any genetic variability, succumbs when its limits of tolerance are exceeded.

D. leucolena sometimes grows as a fouling organism, and has also been found attached as an epibiont on the carapace of a loggerhead sea turtle (Caretta caretta). Approximately two hundred individual sea anemones were present in grooves in the carapace that had been caused by the blades of a propeller; these depressions provided a relatively sheltered habitat for this species which is intolerant of turbulence.
