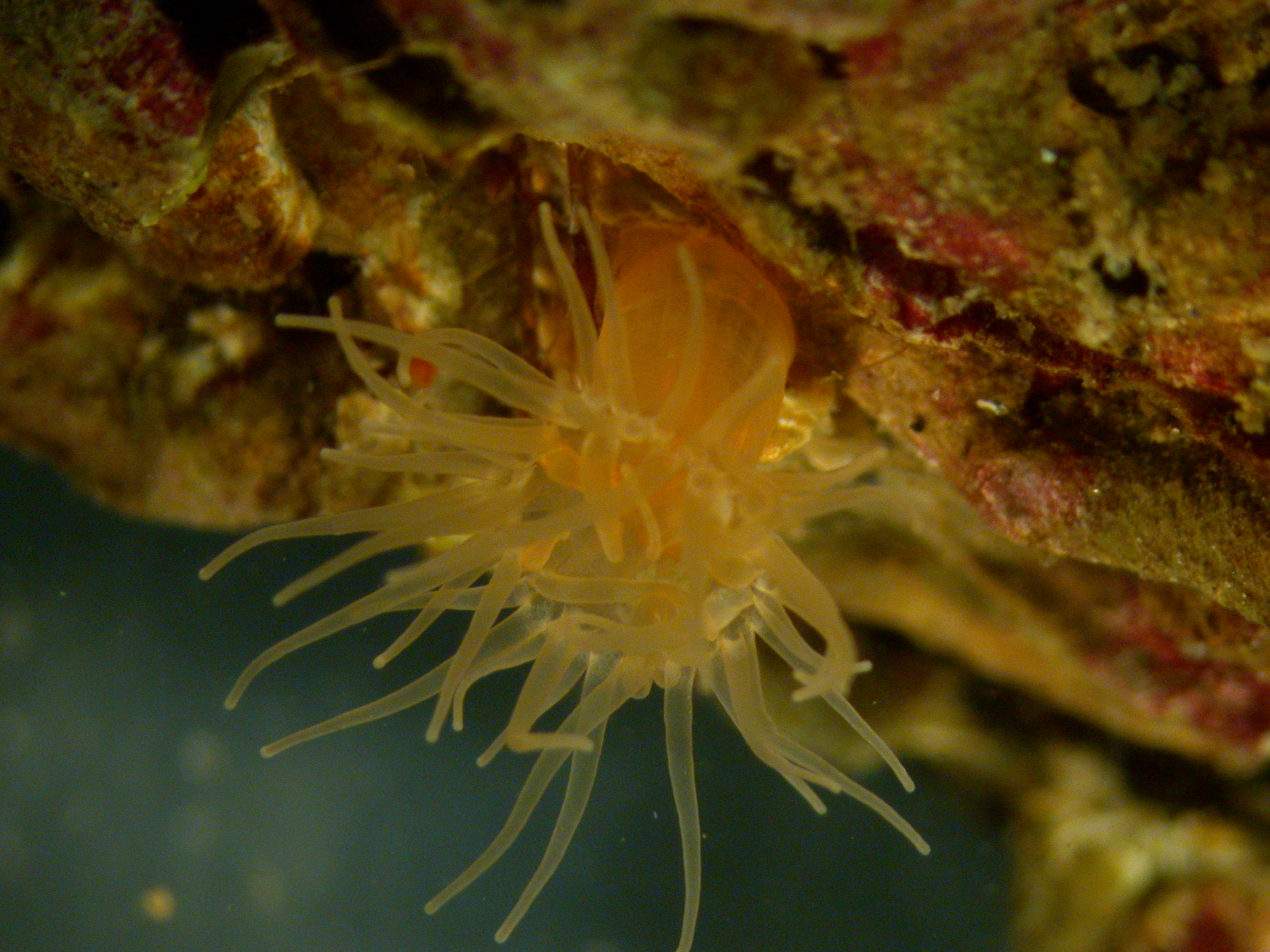
- Diadumene

Scientific classification
- Kingdom: Animalia
- Phylum: Cnidaria
- Subphylum: Anthozoa
- Class: Hexacorallia
- Order: Actiniaria
- Suborder: Enthemonae
- Superfamily: Metridioidea
- Family: Diadumenidae; Stephenson, 1920
- Genus: Diadumene; Stephenson, 1920

Species
- See text

Synonyms
- (Family): Haliplanellidae; (Genus): Diactis Hutton, 1880; Diadumine; Diadunema

= Diadumene =

Genus of sea anemones

Diadumene is a genus of sea anemones. It is the only genus in the monotypic family Diadumenidae.

== Species ==
The World Register of Marine Species lists the following species:-

- Diadumene cincta Stephenson, 1925
- Diadumene crocata (Hutton, 1880)
- Diadumene franciscana Hand, 1956
- Diadumene kameruniensis Carlgren, 1927
- Diadumene leucolena (Verrill, 1866)
- Diadumene lighti Hand, 1956
- Diadumene lineata (Verrill, 1869)
- Diadumene neozelanica Carlgren, 1924
- Diadumene paranaensis Beneti, Stampar, Maronna, Morandini & Da Silveira, 2015
- Diadumene schilleriana (Stoliczka, 1869)
