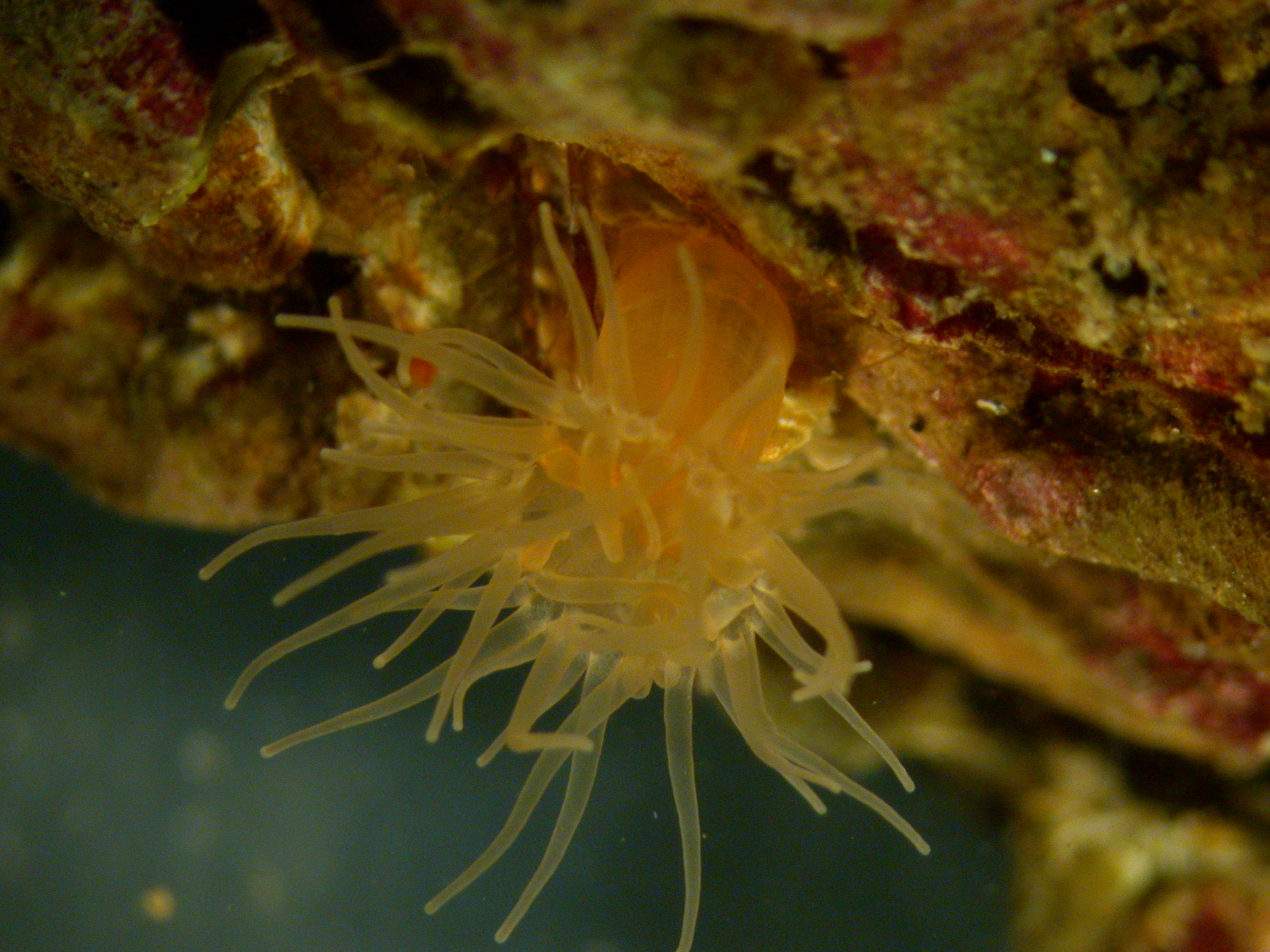

Scientific classification
- Kingdom: Animalia
- Phylum: Cnidaria
- Subphylum: Anthozoa
- Class: Hexacorallia
- Order: Actiniaria
- Family: Diadumenidae
- Genus: Diadumene
- Species: D. cincta

Binomial name
- Diadumene cincta Stephenson, 1925

Synonyms
- Aiptasia erythrochila (Fischer, 1874); Diadumene cincla; Diadunema cincta; Farsonia cincta (Stephenson, 1925); Sagartia (Solenactinia) erythrochila (Fischer); Sagartia erythrochila Fischer, 1874; Solenactinia erythrochila Fischer

= Diadumene cincta =

Species of sea anemone

Diadumene cincta, the orange anemone, is a small and delicate, usually orange, sea anemone. It has a smooth slender column and up to 200 long tentacles, and normally grows to a length of up to 35 mm (1.4 in), with a base of 10 mm (0.4 in), but specimens twice this size have been recorded. Diadumene cincta is found in the northeastern Atlantic Ocean.

== Description ==
Diadumene cincta is a slender, delicate, cylindrical anemone. It grows to around 35 mm (1.4 in) in length when fully expanded, with a basal width of 10 mm (0.4 in), the base being slightly wider than the column. The lower part of the column is opaque and is separated from the translucent upper part by a small ledge and groove. The oral disc is no wider than the column, and has a central mouth surrounded by up to 200 long, slender tentacles. This sea anemone is usually orange in colour, sometimes with a greenish tinge, but some populations are fawn. Some of the tentacles are thicker and longer than normal tentacles and are known as catch tentacles; these are common in some populations but absent in others.

Smaller individuals might be confused with Metridium dianthus, but the column in D. cincta is more slender and the tentacles are less numerous than those of M. dianthus and do not have a feathery appearance.

== Distribution ==
Diadumene cincta is native to the northeastern Atlantic Ocean where its range includes the southern North Sea, the coasts of Britain and the western coast of France. This species attaches itself to any available hard substrate, such as rock, mussels or other bivalves. It occurs in the lower littoral zone and the shallow sublittoral zone down to 40 m (130 ft); it is frequently found in pools and caves, but not in positions where it would be exposed to the air at low tide. It tends to grow in close proximity to its neighbours in crowded aggregations.

== Ecology ==
Sea anemones are predators, catching prey with their tentacles and immobilising it with their stinging cells. The tentacles then bend to pass the food into the mouth. This species reproduces by basal laceration; as the animal moves on its base across the substrate, a chunk of tissue becomes detached and in time, develops into a new individual. If attacked, this species can discharge acontia (long threads with stinging cells) through its mouth.

Diadumene cincta is often an important member of the communities of which it is a part; on the projecting parts of wrecks on the continental shelf of Holland, it is dominant along with the breadcrumb sponge Halichondria panicea and the cave-dwelling anemone Sagartia troglodytes.
