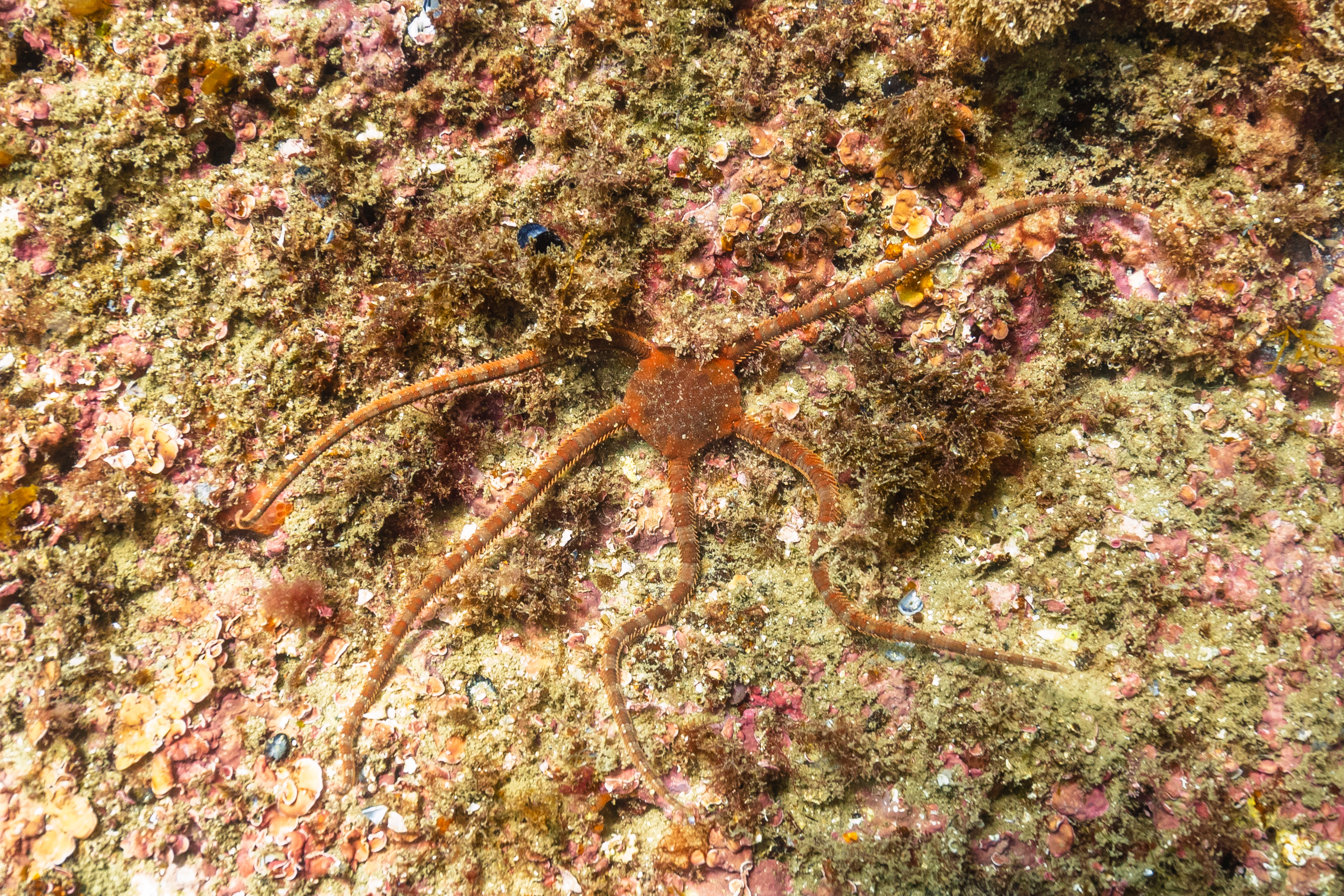
- Ophioderma longicaudum

Scientific classification
- Kingdom: Animalia
- Phylum: Echinodermata
- Class: Ophiuroidea
- Order: Ophiacanthida
- Family: Ophiodermatidae
- Genus: Ophioderma; Müller & Troschel, 1840

= Ophioderma (echinoderm) =

Ophioderma Temporal range: Changhsingian–Recent

Genus of brittle stars

Ophioderma is a genus of brittle stars in the family Ophiodermatidae. Research on the Ophiuroid rubicundum species has discovered the creatures opportunistic behaviors and ability to adapt in the circumstances of a new given environment. Alongside their high adaptability, their strong feeding responses allow them to thrive in the depths of the coral reefs seen in the western Atlantic.

== Reproduction ==
Brittle stars can reproduce in three different ways, sexual, asexual, and larval. In sexual reproduction, they engage in broadcast spawning, which is releasing eggs and sperm in the water where external fertilization occurs. The fertilized egg turns into planktonic larvae that drift before settling on the ocean floor; then, they mature into adult brittle stars. During asexual reproduction, they reproduce through regeneration. When an arm is lost, it can regenerate and, in some species, form a new arm. This form of reproduction allows certain species to enhance their survival. And lastly, larval development, following fertilization, brittle star larvae undergo various developmental stages before transitioning into adulthood. In some species, larvae may remain attached to the parent until they can sustain themselves.

== Feeding behavior ==
Brittle stars have been observed to opportunistically feed on the spawn of various coral species. During coral spawning, the Brittle Star will coil it's arms around gamete bundles released by the coral.

== Species ==
It includes the following species:

- Ophioderma africanum Stöhr, Weber, Boissin & Chenuil, 2020
- Ophioderma aija Humara-Gil, Granja-Fernandez, Bautista-Guerrero, Solis-Marin & Rodriguez-Troncoso, 2024
- Ophioderma anitae Hotchkiss, 1982
- Ophioderma appressum (Say, 1825)
- Ophioderma besnardi Tommasi, 1970
- Ophioderma bichi Humara-Gil, Granja-Fernandez, Bautista-Guerrero, Solis-Marin & Rodriguez-Troncoso, 2024
- Ophioderma brevicaudum Lütken, 1856
- Ophioderma brevispinum (Say, 1825)
- Ophioderma devaneyi Hendler & Miller, 1984
- Ophioderma divae Tommasi, 1971
- Ophioderma elaps Lütken, 1856
- Ophioderma ensiferum Hendler & Miller, 1984
- Ophioderma guineense Greeff, 1882
- Ophioderma guttatum Lütken, 1859
- Ophioderma hendleri Granja-Fernandez, Pineda-Enriquez, Solis-Marin & Laguarda-Figueras, 2020
- Ophioderma holmesii (Lyman, 1860)
- Ophioderma hybridum Stöhr, Weber, Boissin & Chenuil, 2020
- Ophioderma januarii Lütken, 1856
- Ophioderma longicaudum (Bruzelius, 1805)
- Ophioderma occultum Humara-Gil, Granja-Fernandez, Bautista-Guerrero & Rodriguez-Troncoso, 2022
- Ophioderma pallidum (Verrill, 1899)
- Ophioderma panamense Lütken, 1859
- Ophioderma pentacanthum H.L. Clark, 1917
- Ophioderma peruanum Pineda-Enriquez, Solis-Marin, Hooker & Laguarda-Figueras, 2013
- Ophioderma phoenium H.L. Clark, 1918
- Ophioderma propinquum Koehler, 1895
- Ophioderma rubicundum Lütken, 1856
- Ophioderma squamosissimum Lütken, 1856
- Ophioderma teres (Lyman, 1860)
- Ophioderma tonganum Lütken, 1872
- Ophioderma unicolor H.L. Clark, 1940
- Ophioderma vansyoci Hendler, 1996
- Ophioderma variegatum Lütken, 1856
- Ophioderma wahlbergii Müller & Troschel, 1842
- Ophioderma zibrowii Stöhr, Weber, Boissin & Chenuil, 2020
- † Ophioderma bonaudoae Martinez & Del Rio, 2008
- † Ophioderma delsatei Thuy, 2005
- † Ophioderma dentatum Kutscher, 1988
- † Ophioderma hauchecorni Eck, 1872
- † Ophioderma radiatum Kutscher & Jagt, 2000
- † Ophioderma spectabile Hess, 1966
- † Ophioderma substriatum (Rasmussen, 1950)
- † Ophioderma tenuibrachiatum Forbes, 1843
- † Ophioderma waliabadense Kristan-Tollmann, Tollmann & Hamedani, 1979
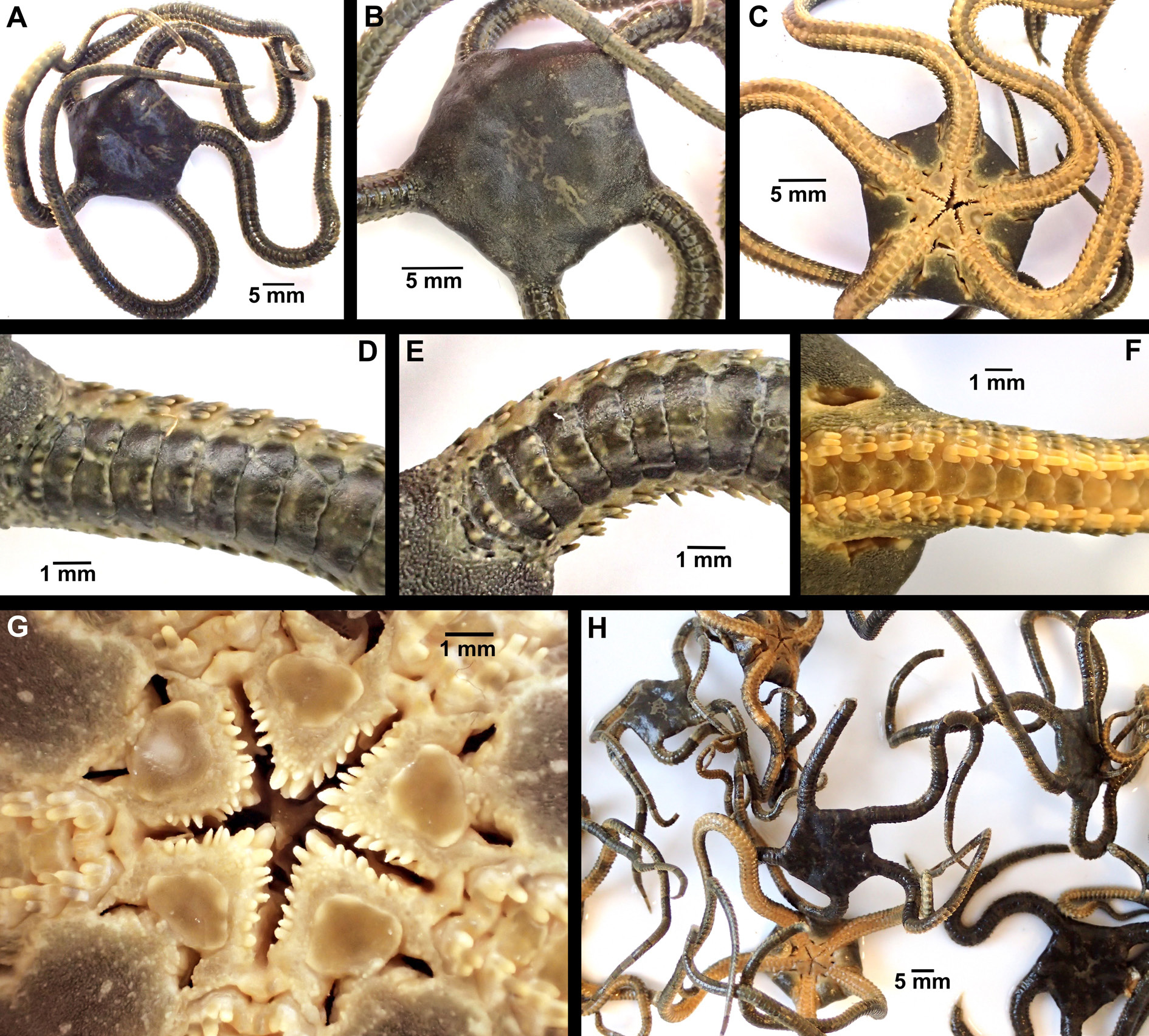
Ophioderma africanum

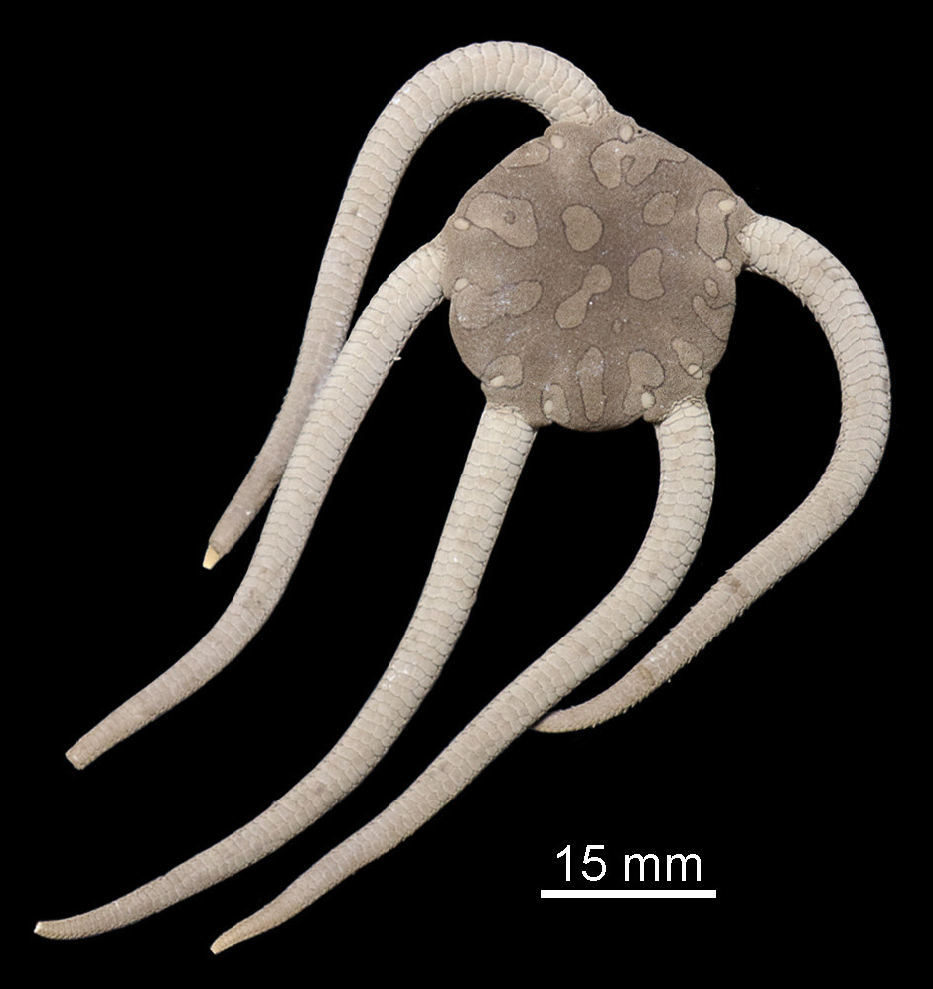
Ophioderma aija

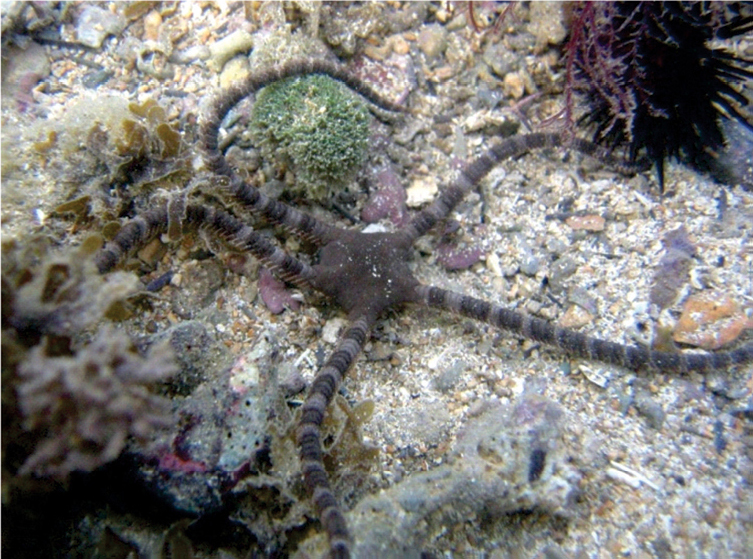
Ophioderma appressa

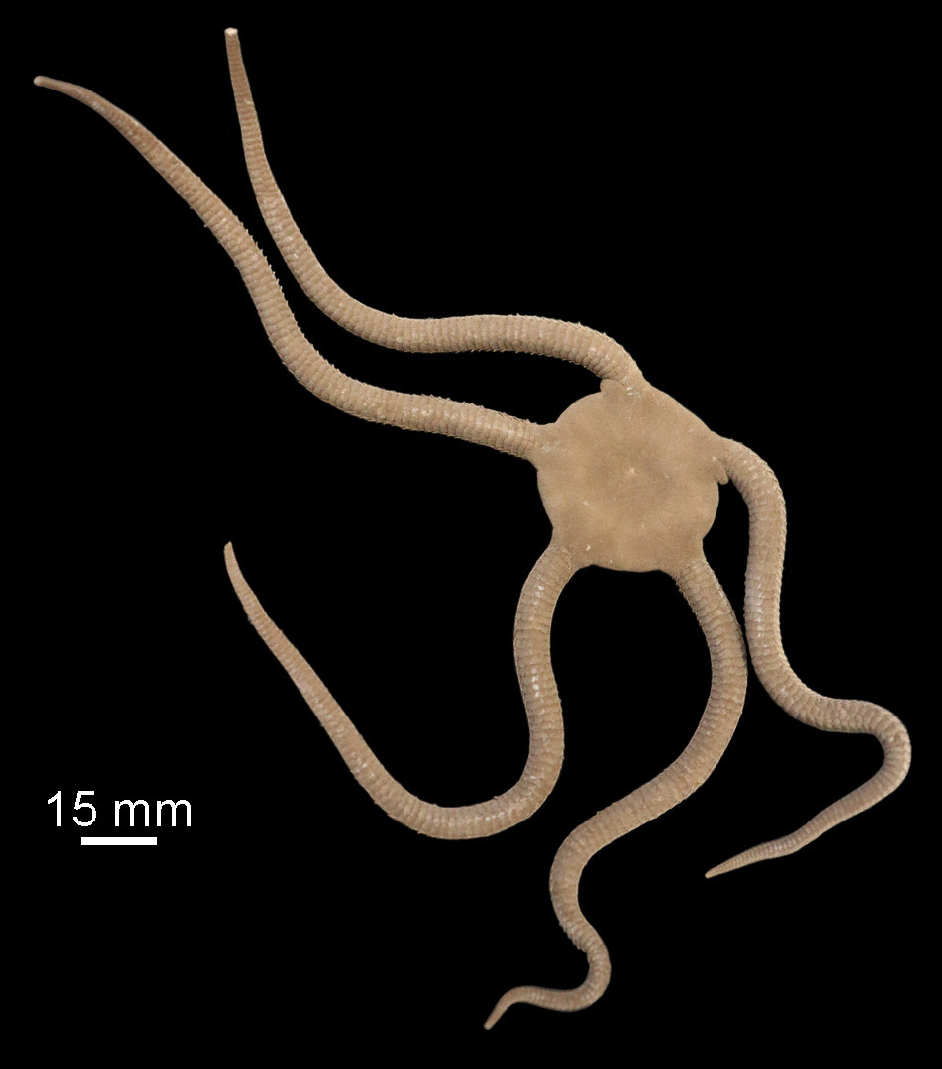
Ophioderma bichi

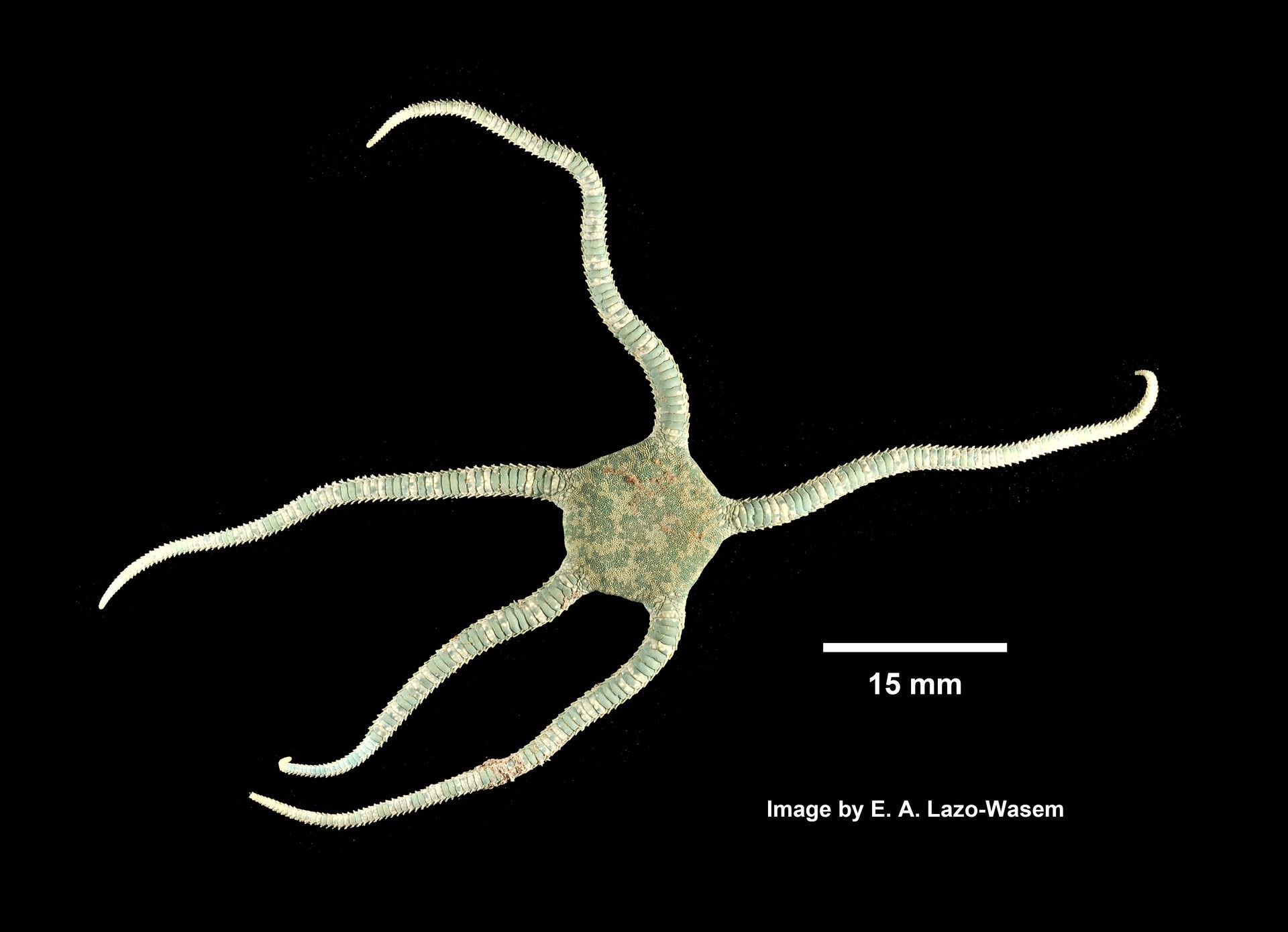
Ophioderma brevicaudum

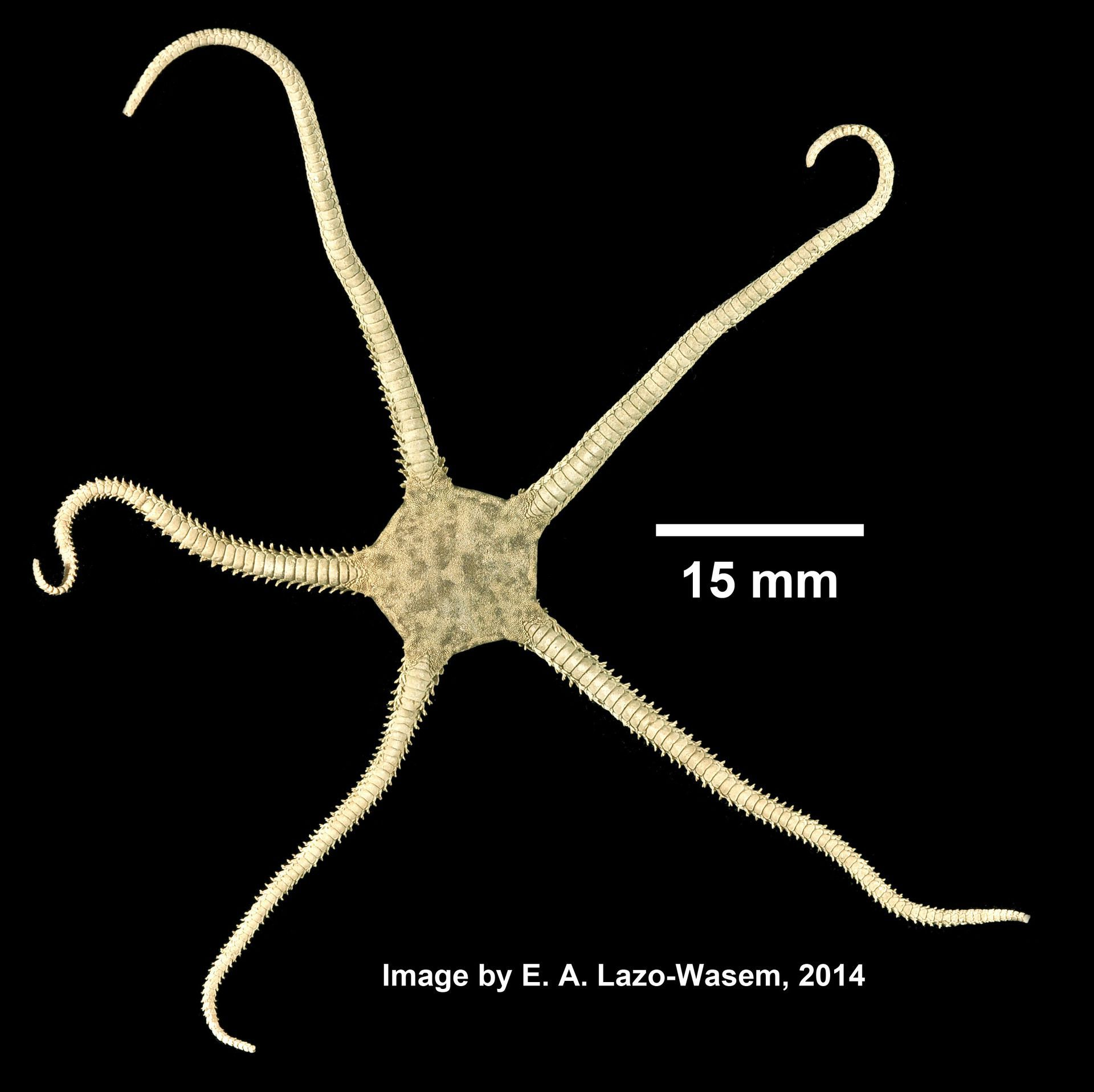
Ophioderma brevispina

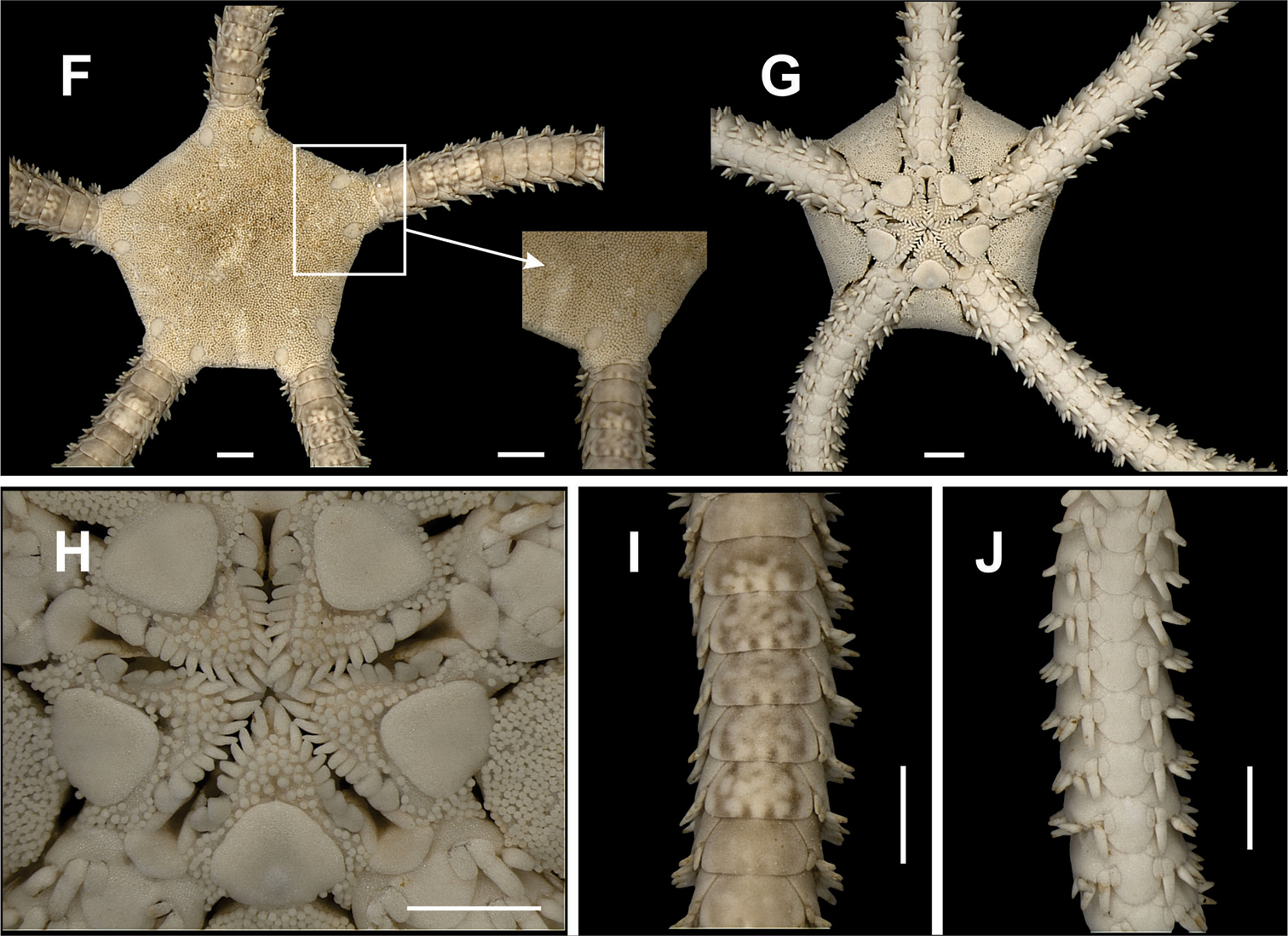
Ophioderma cinerea

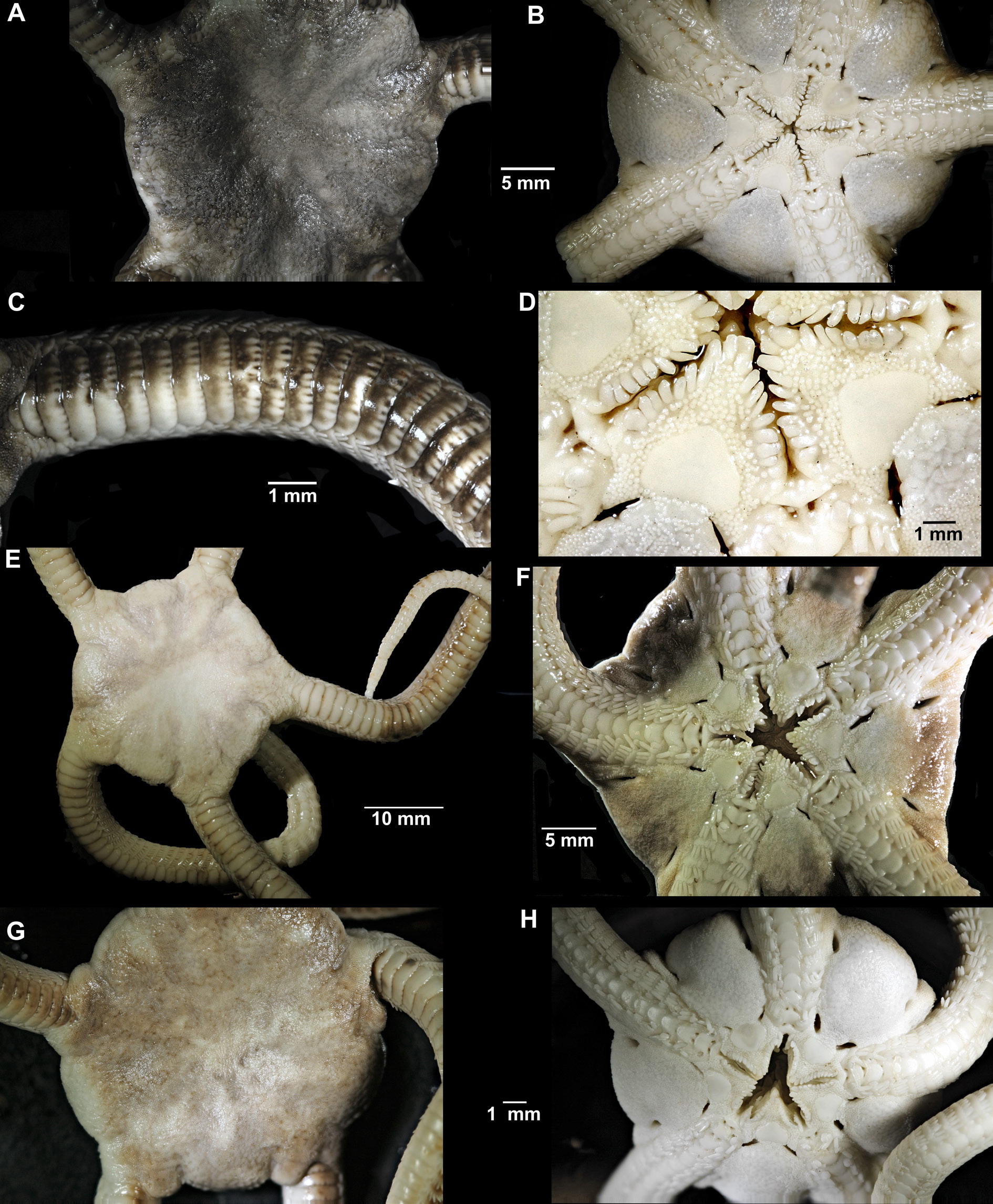
Ophioderma guineense

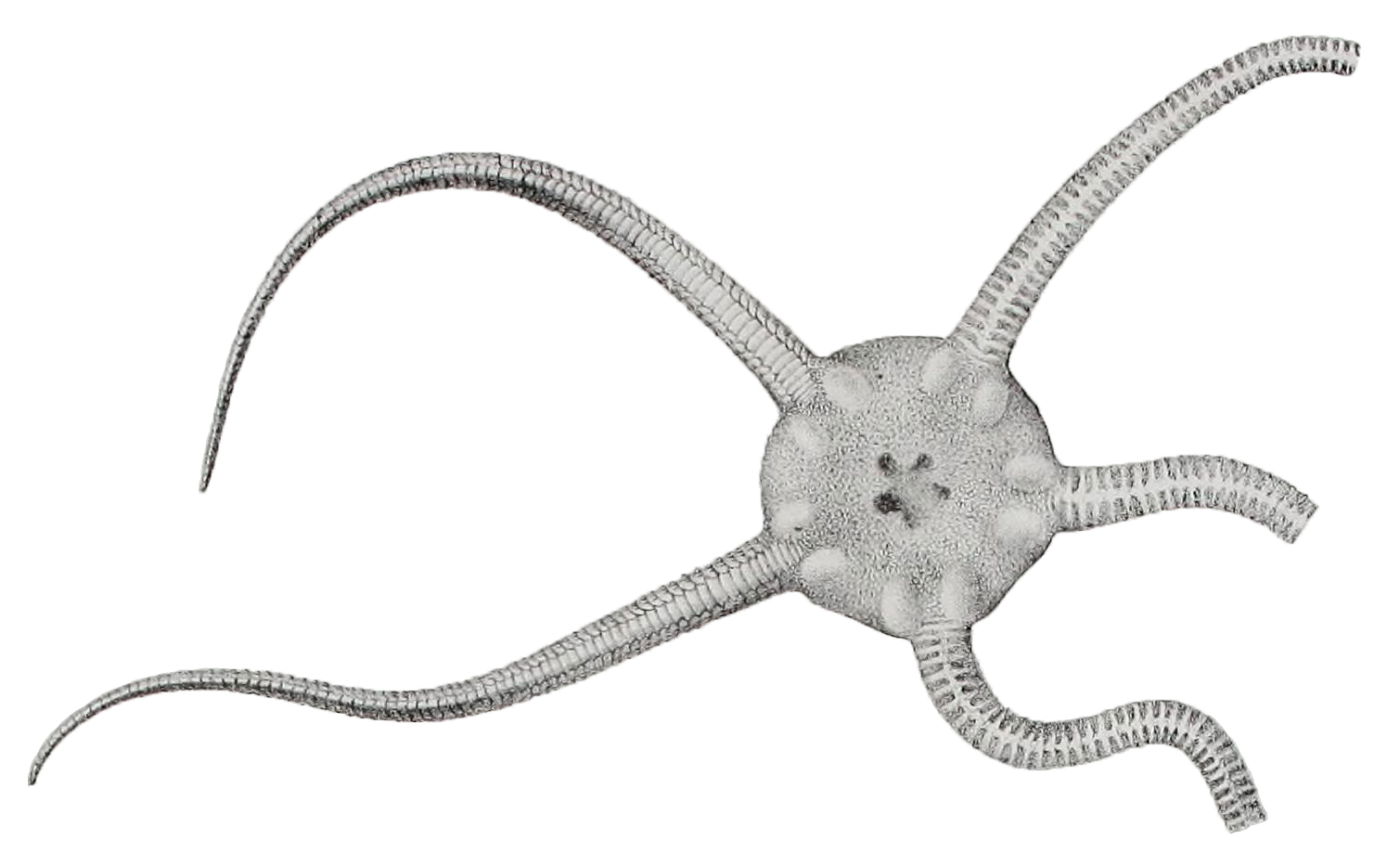
Ophioderma hauchecorni

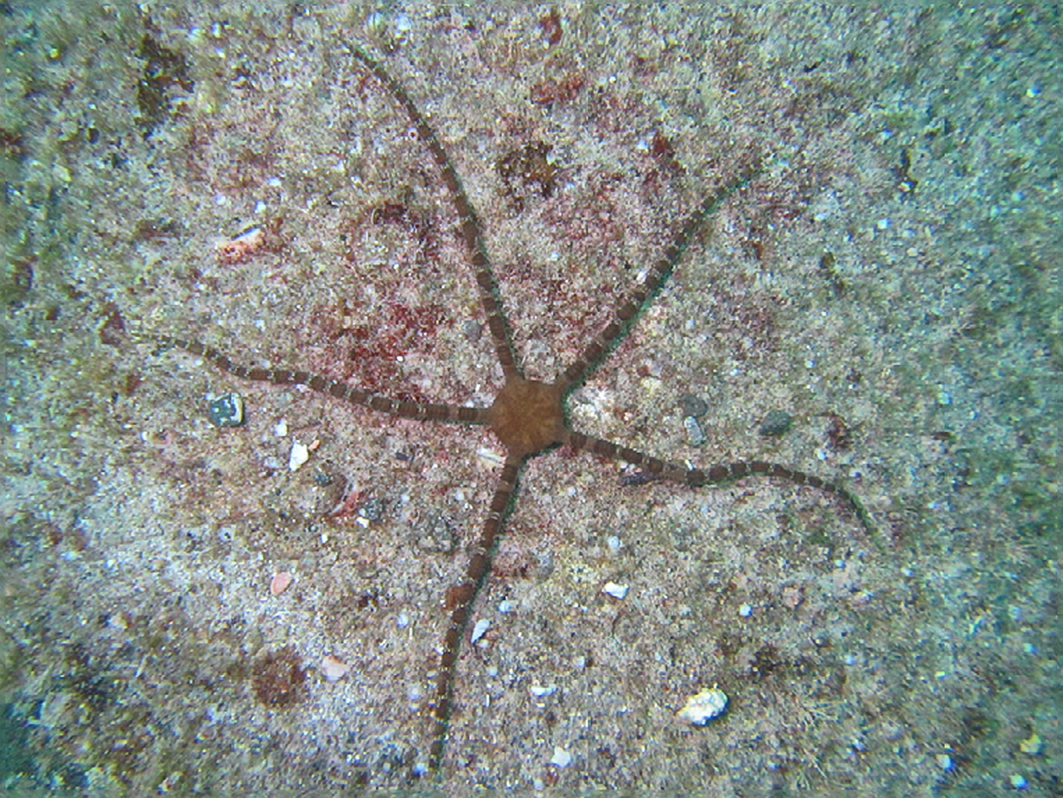
Ophioderma hendleri

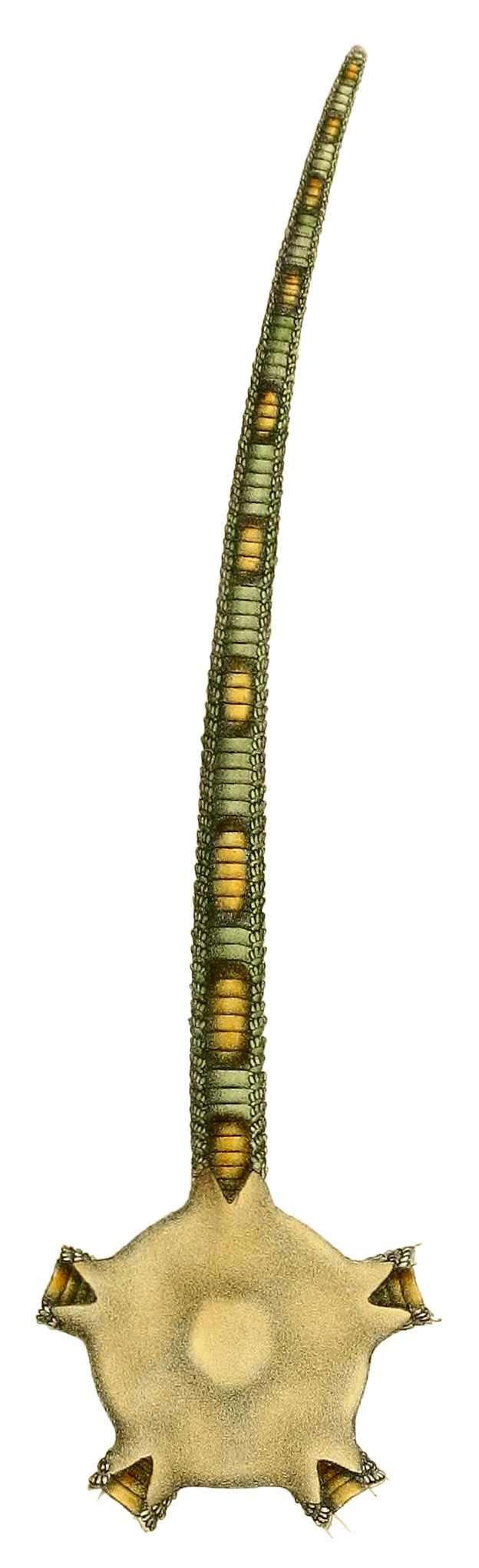
Ophioderma holmesii

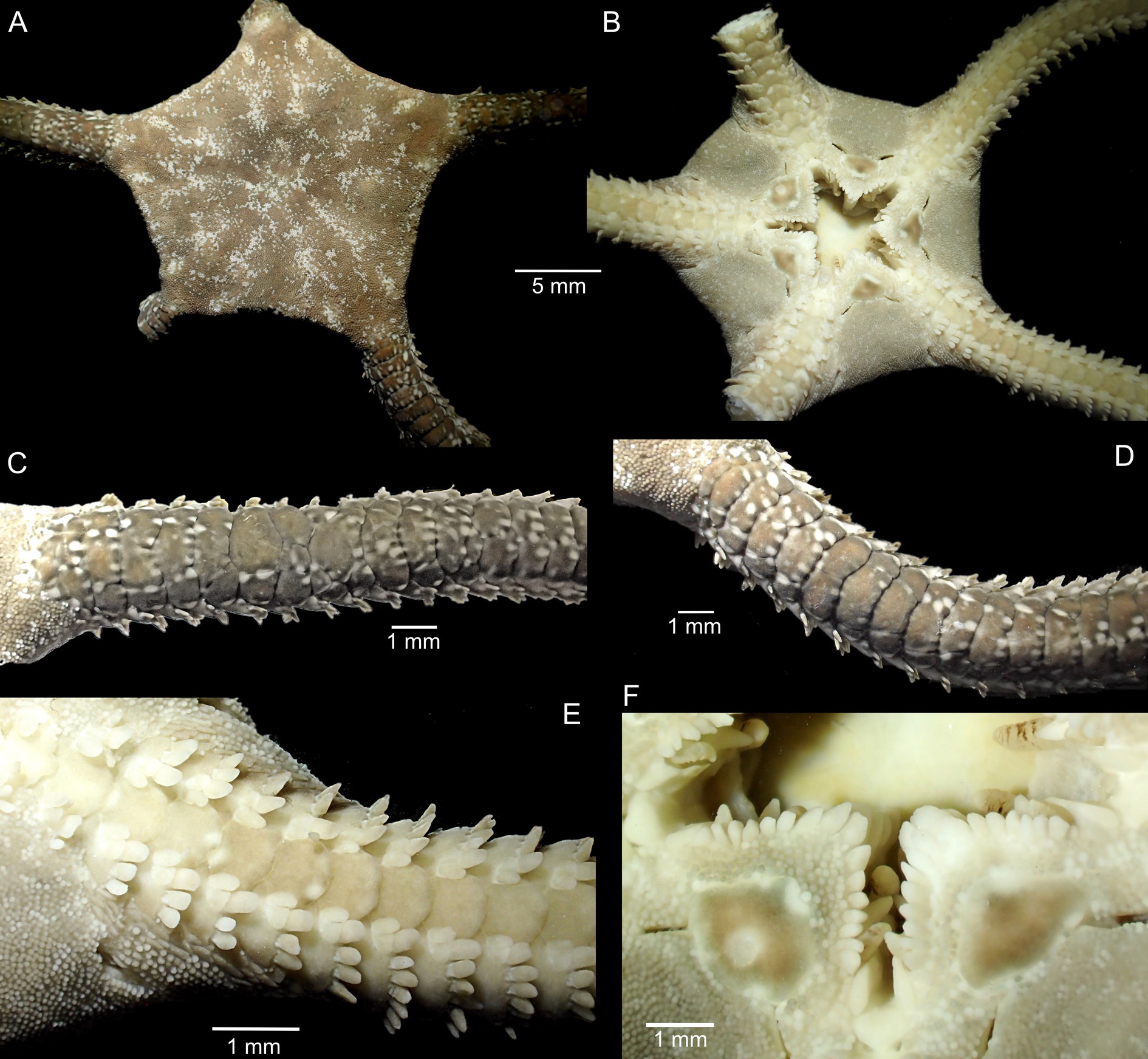
Ophioderma hybridum

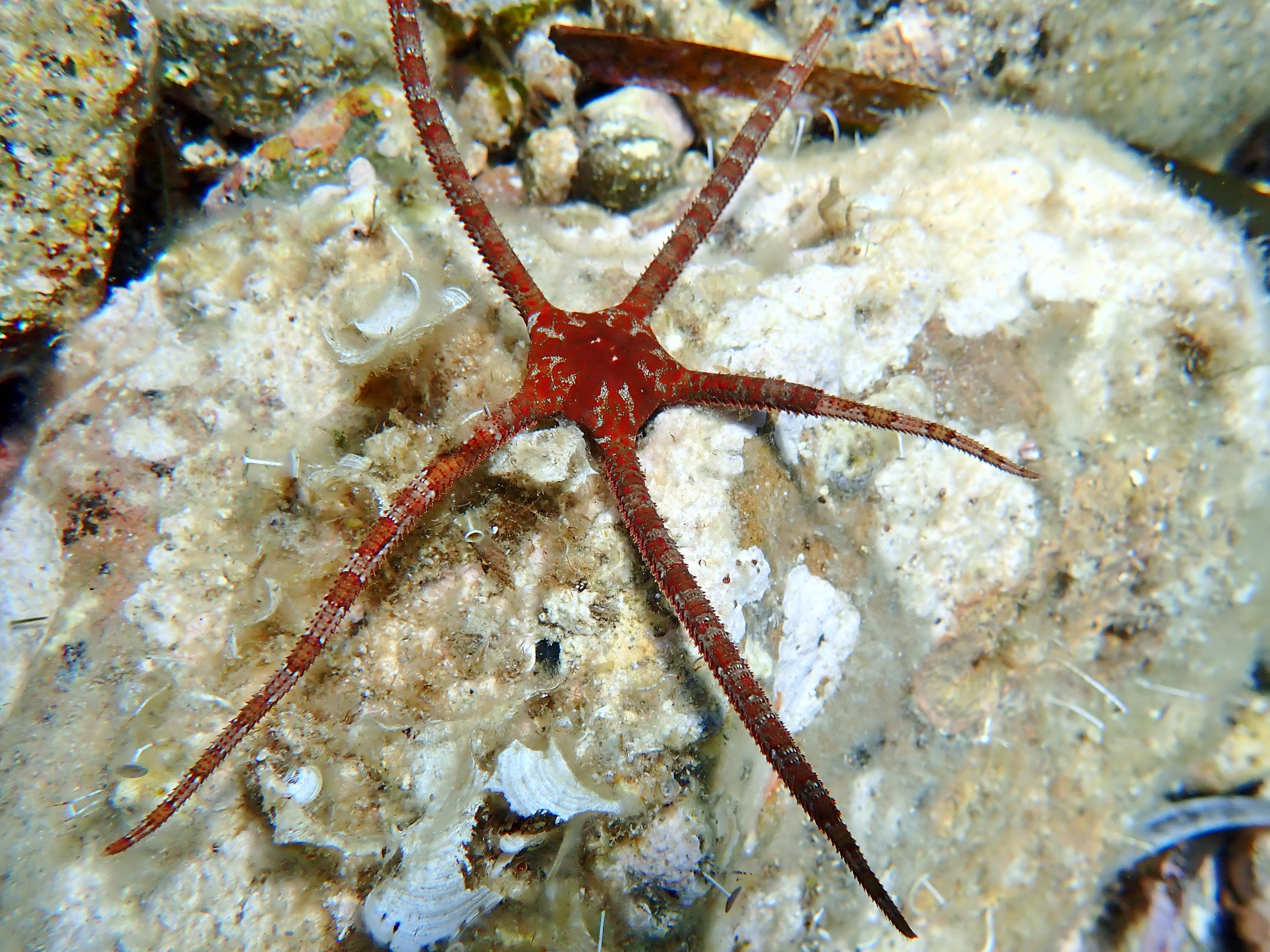
Ophioderma longicauda

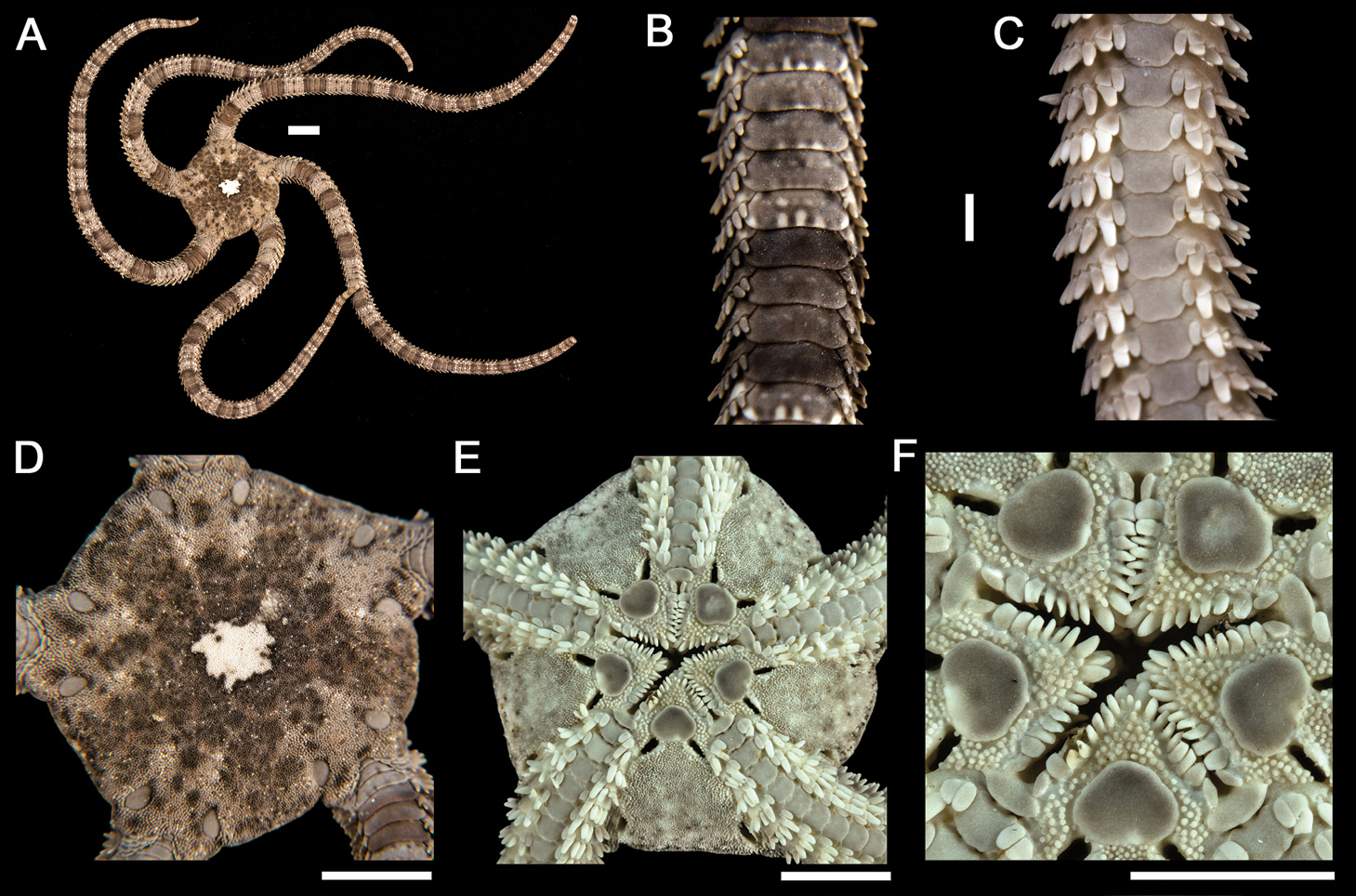
Ophioderma panamensis

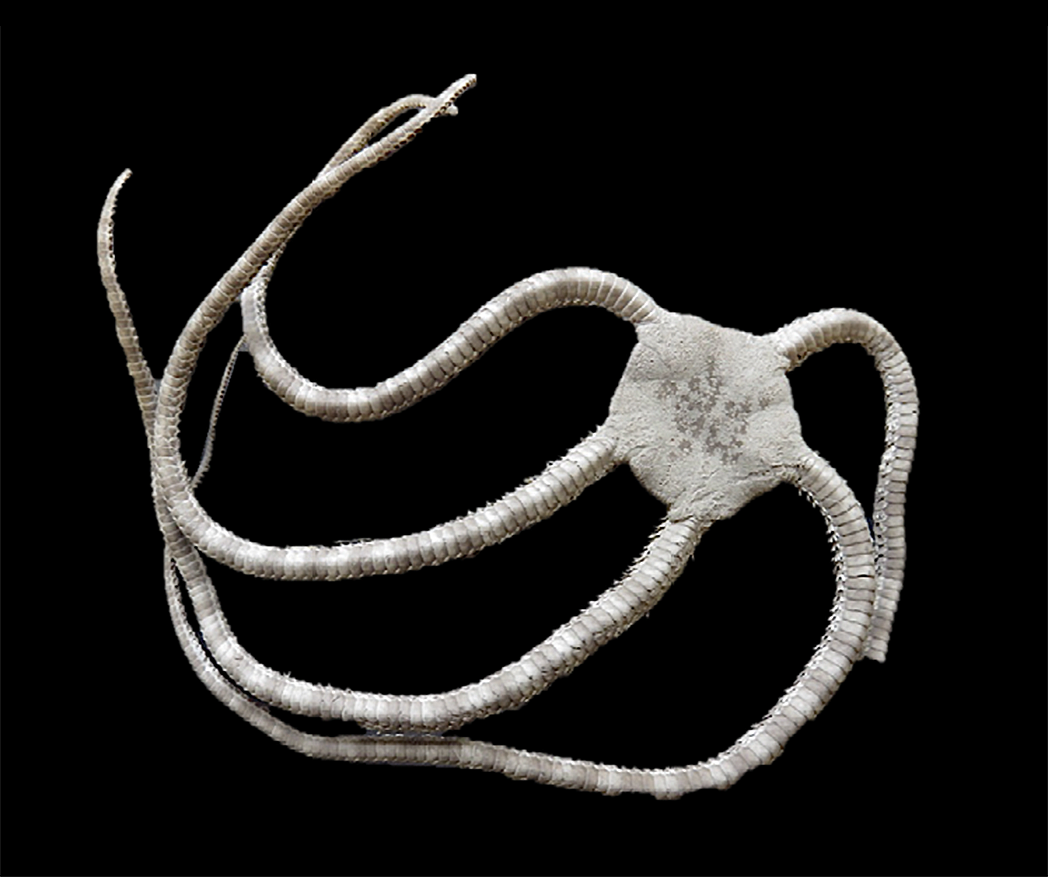
Ophioderma pentacantha

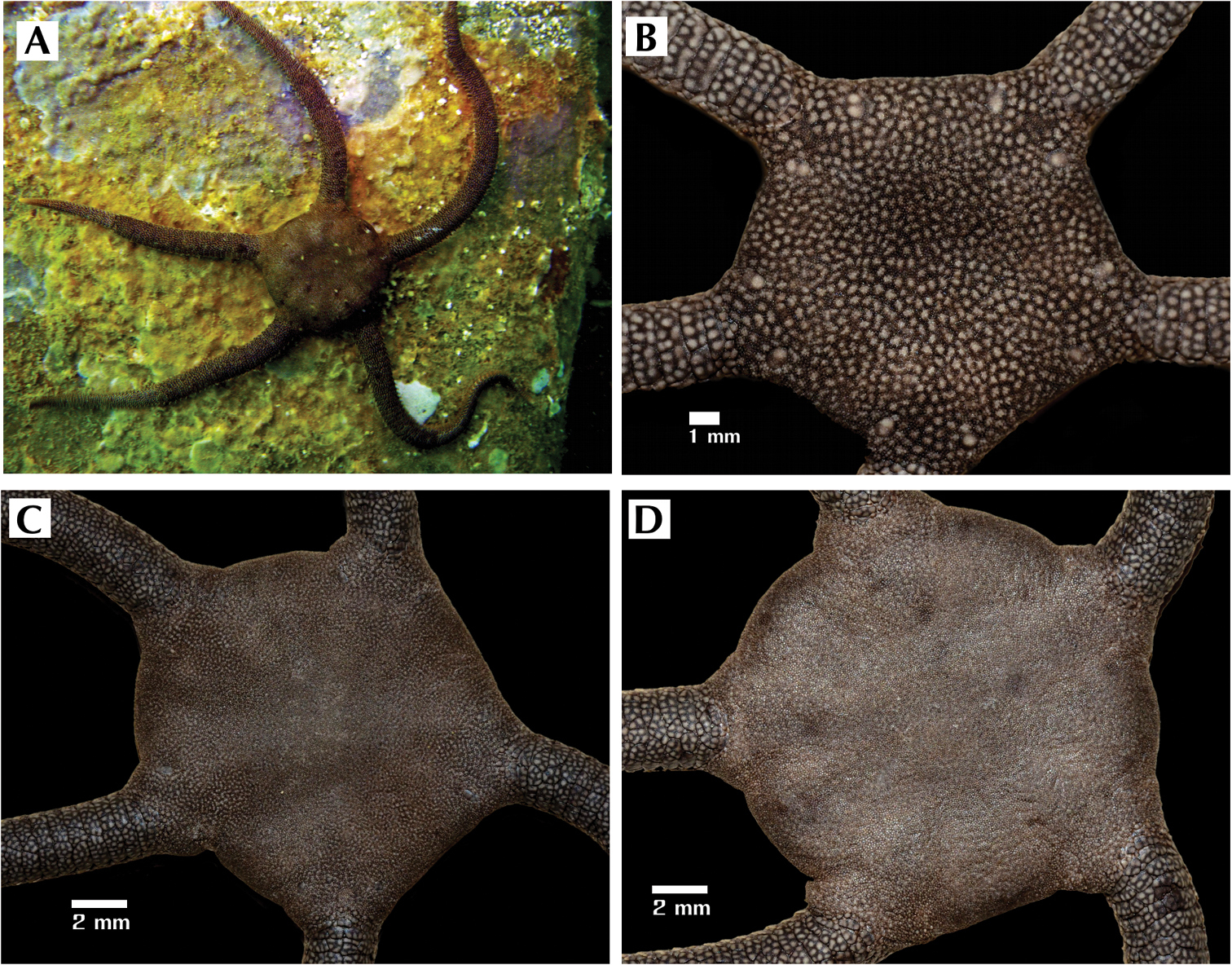
Ophioderma peruana

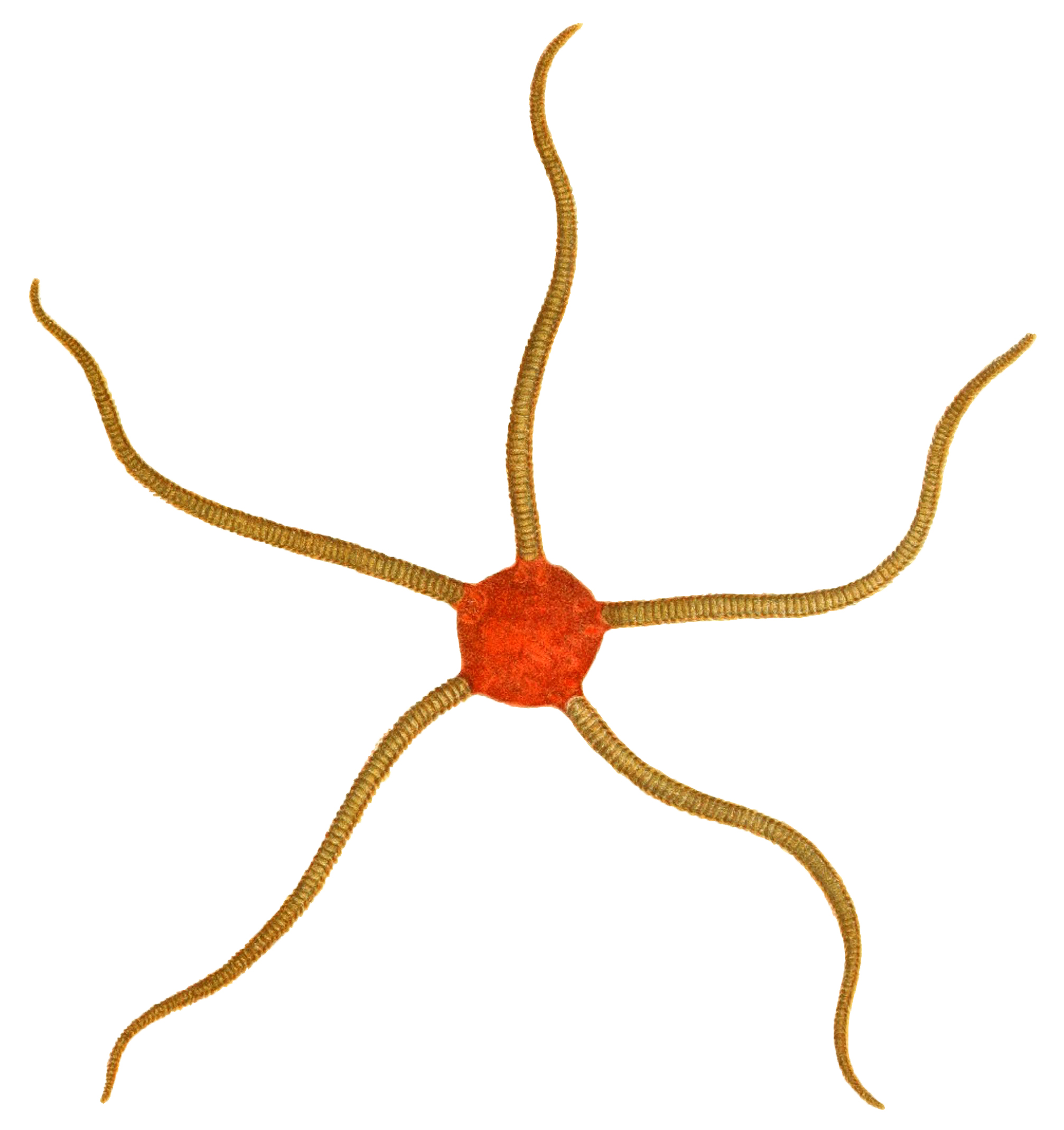
Ophioderma phoenium

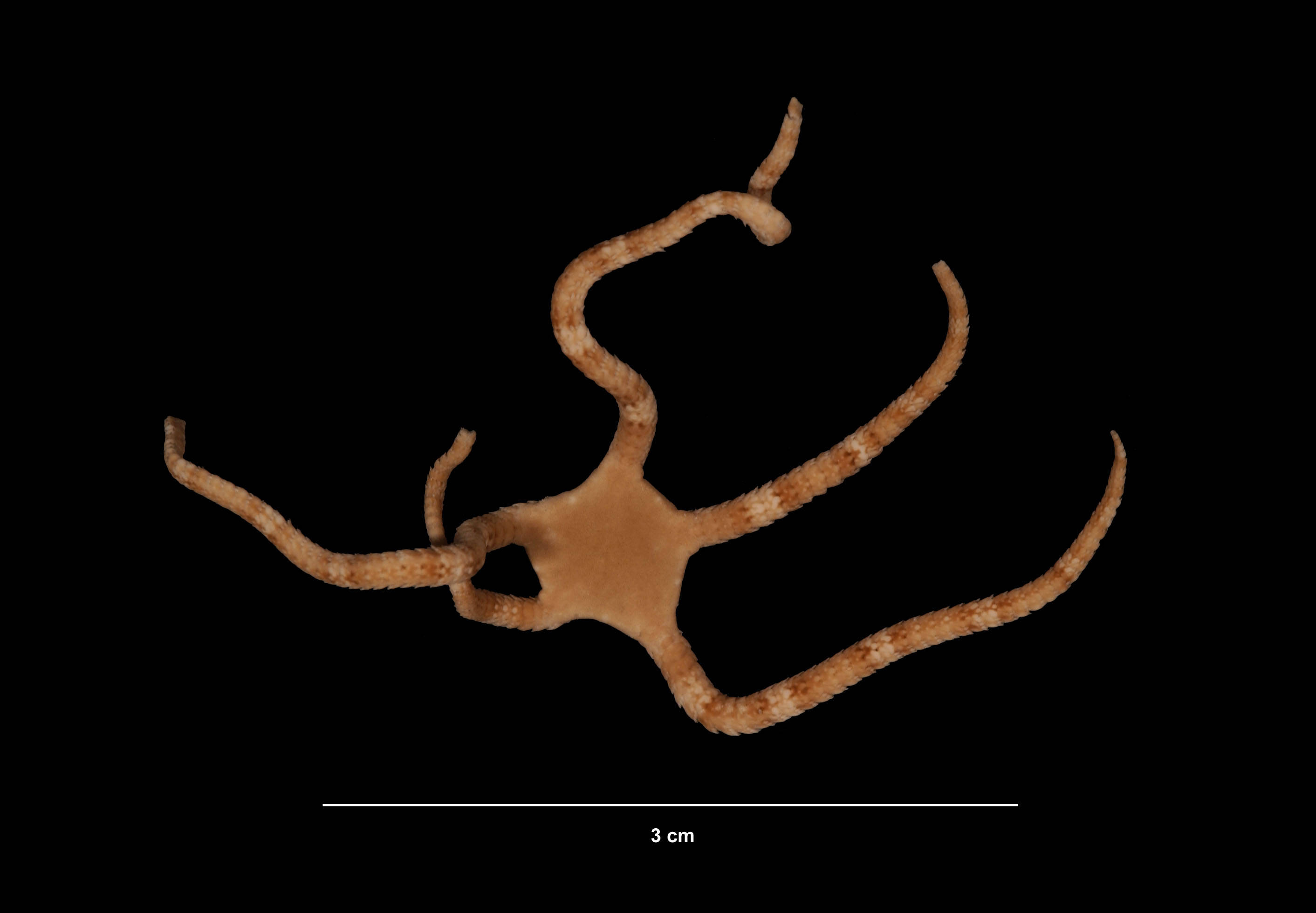
Ophioderma rubicundum

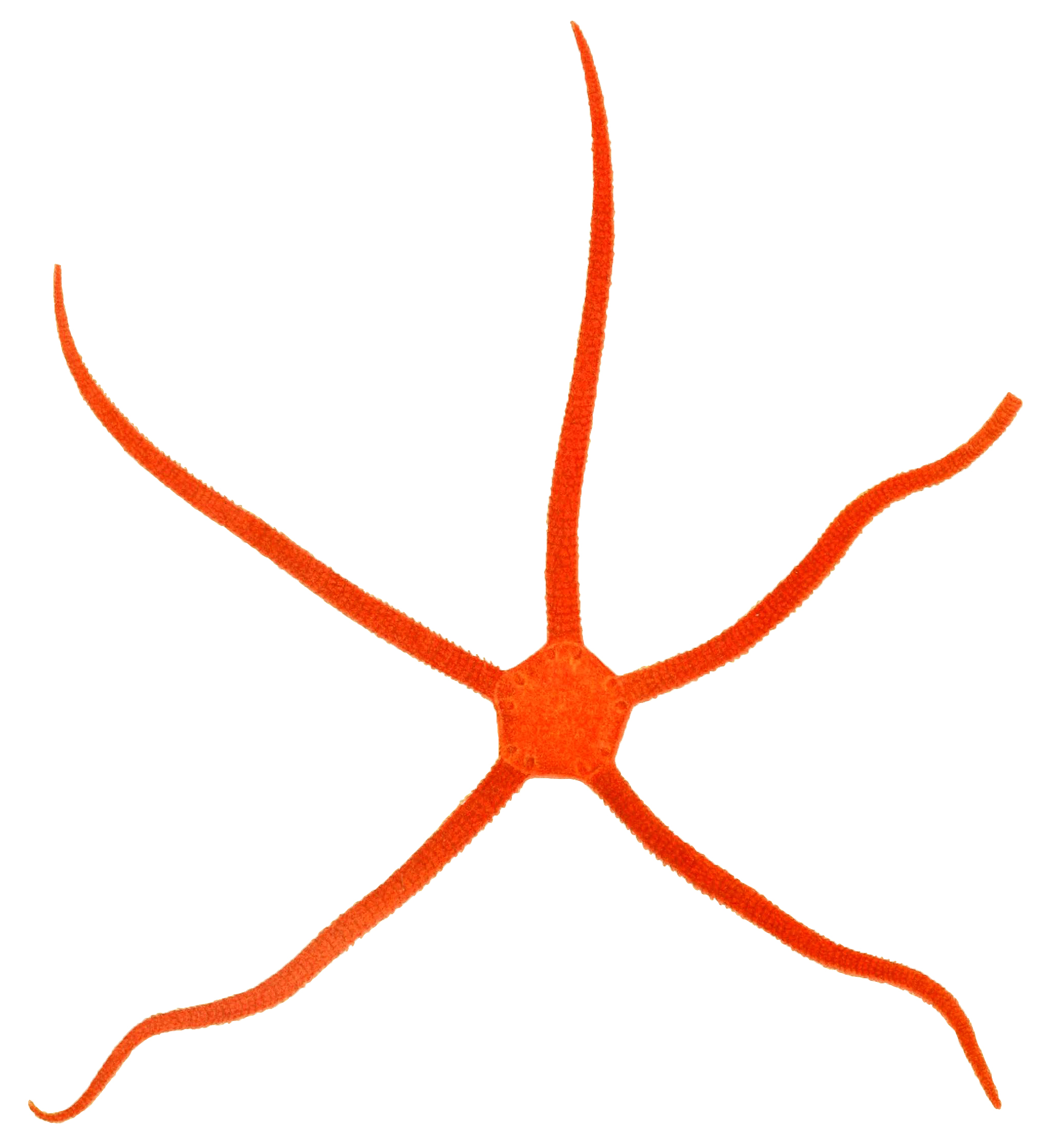
Ophioderma squamosissimum

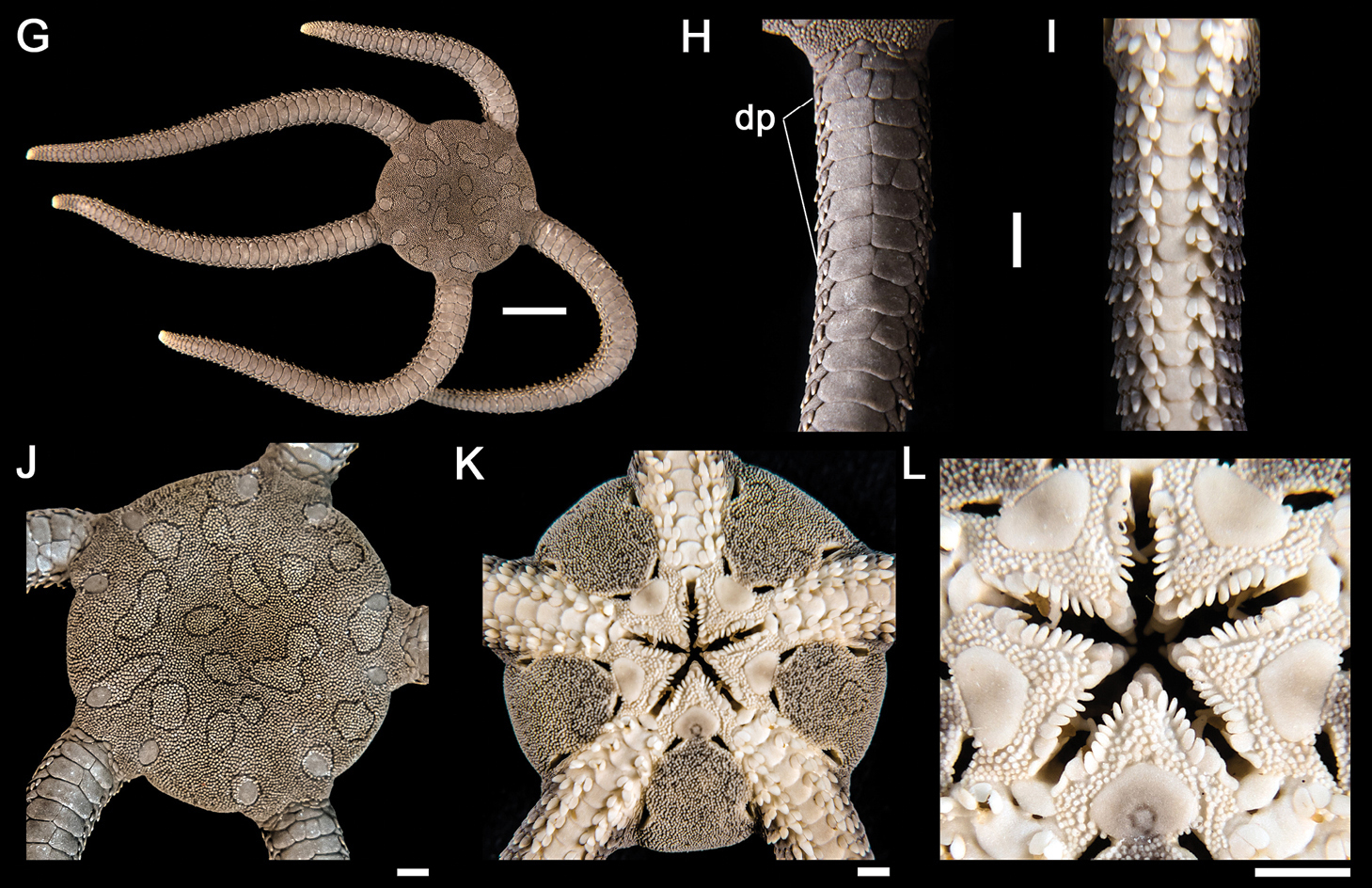
Ophioderma teres

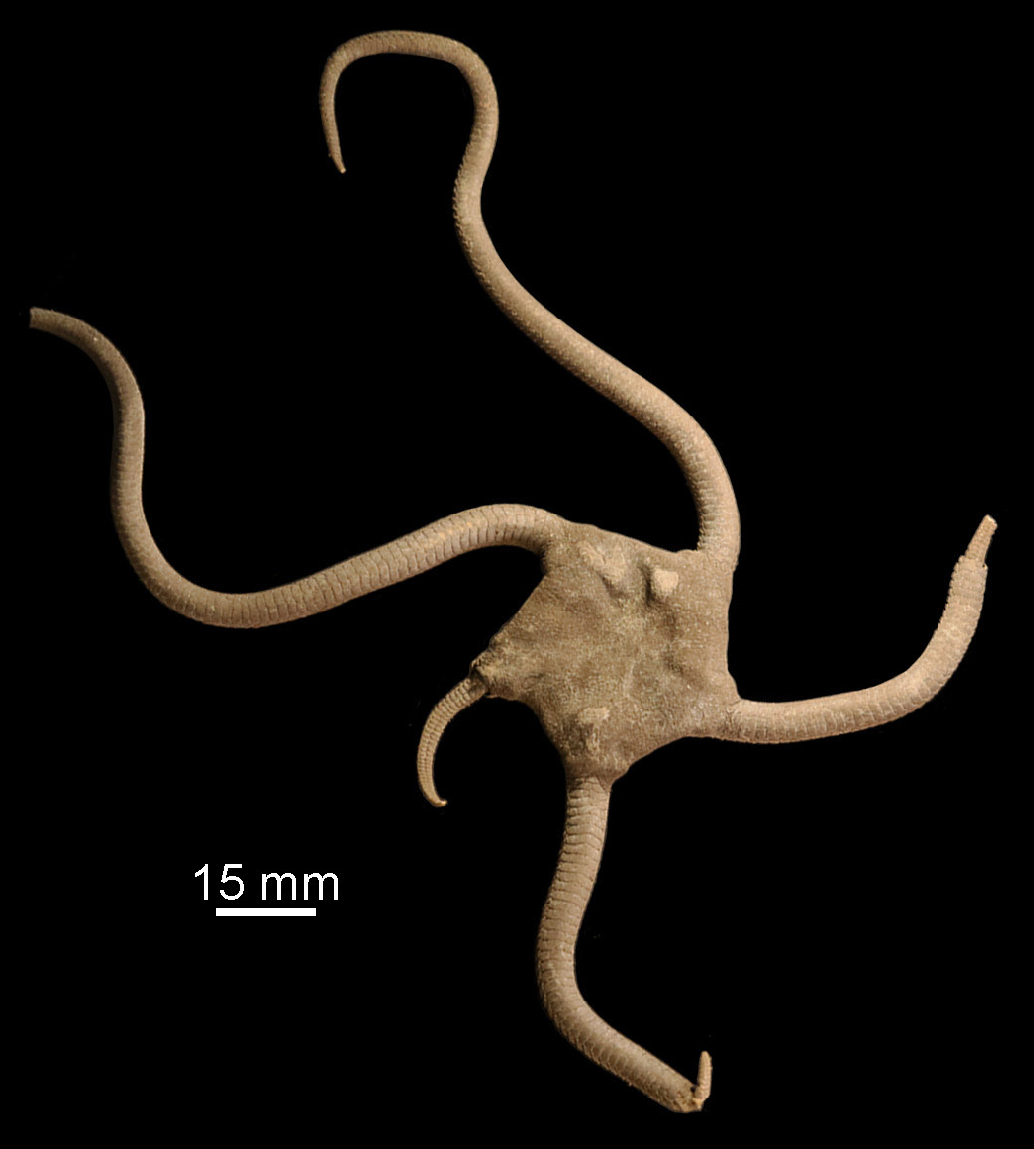
Ophioderma unicolor

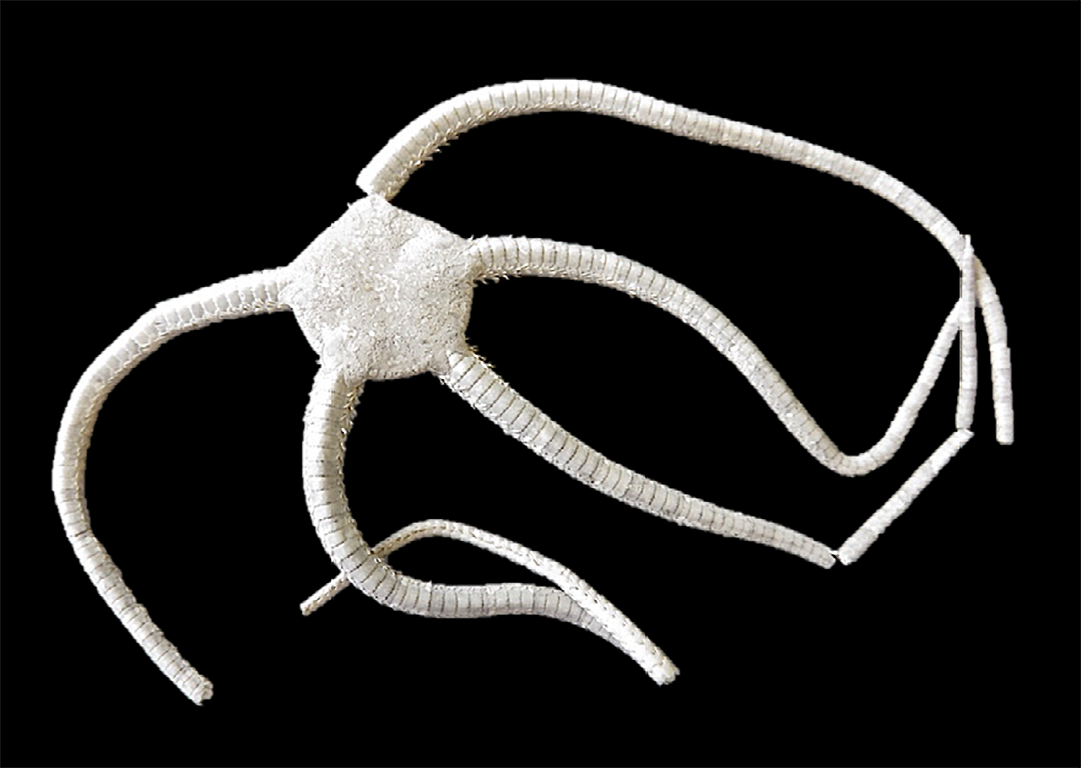
Ophioderma variegatum

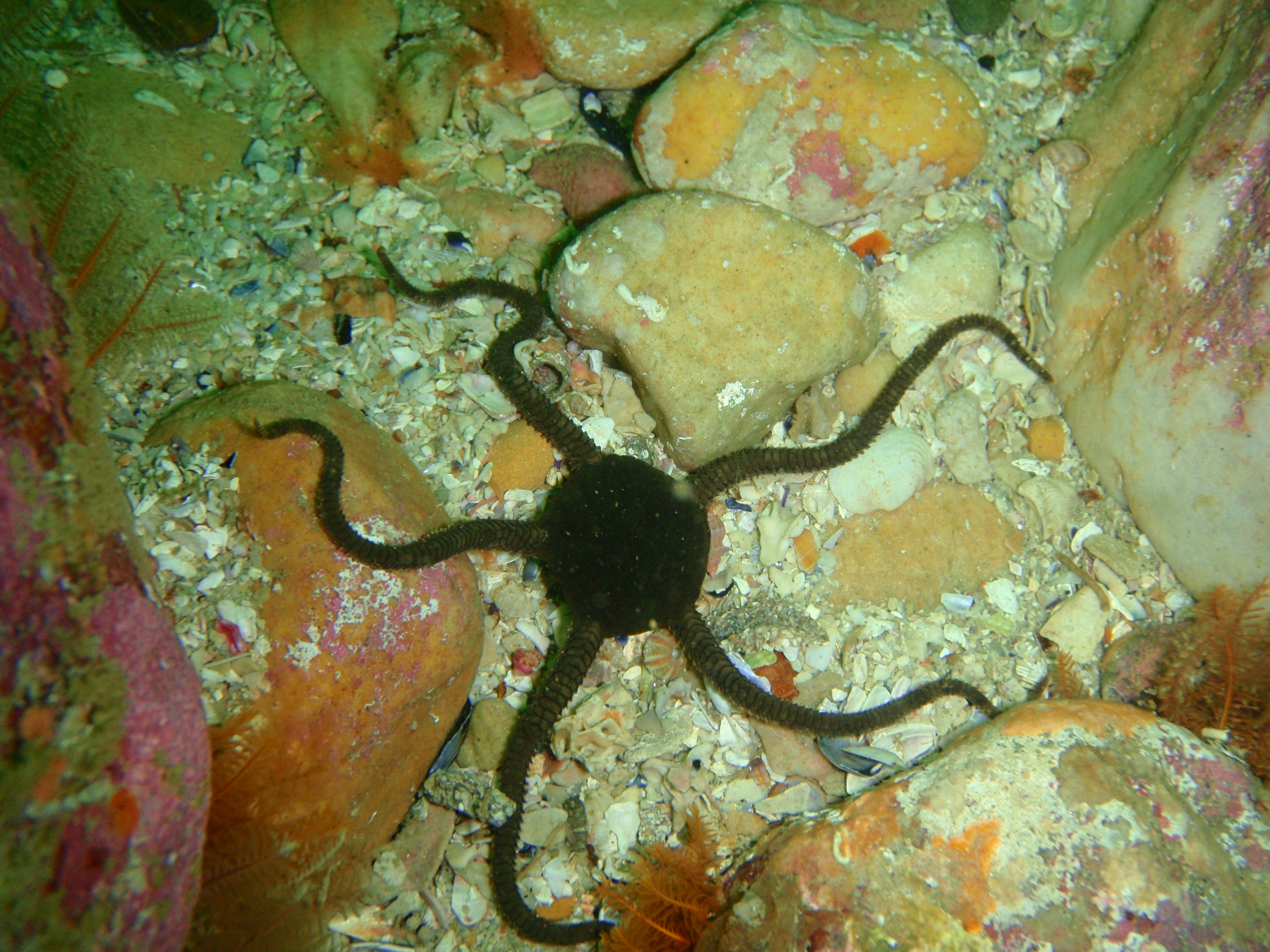
Ophioderma wahlbergi

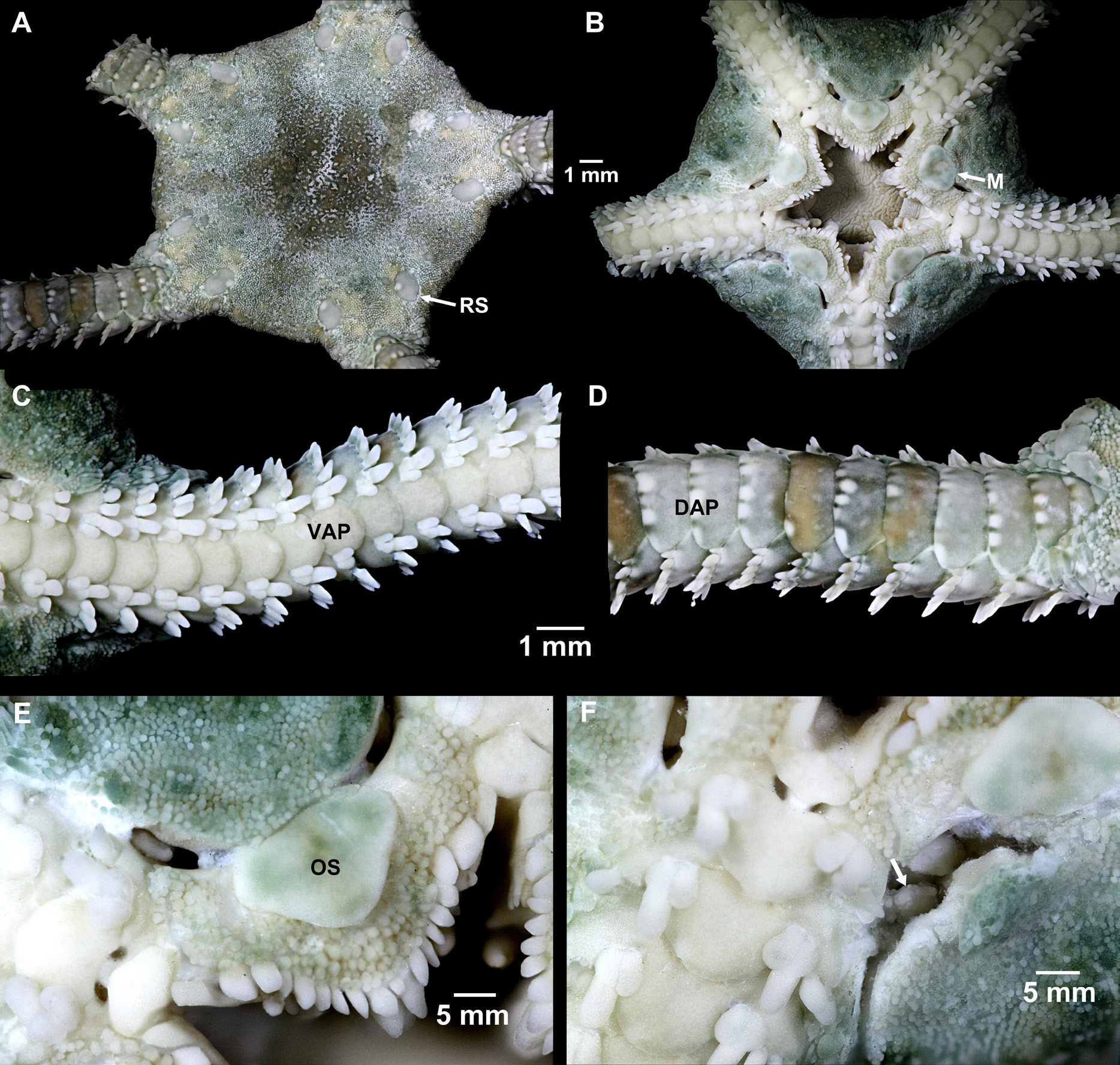
Ophioderma zibrowii

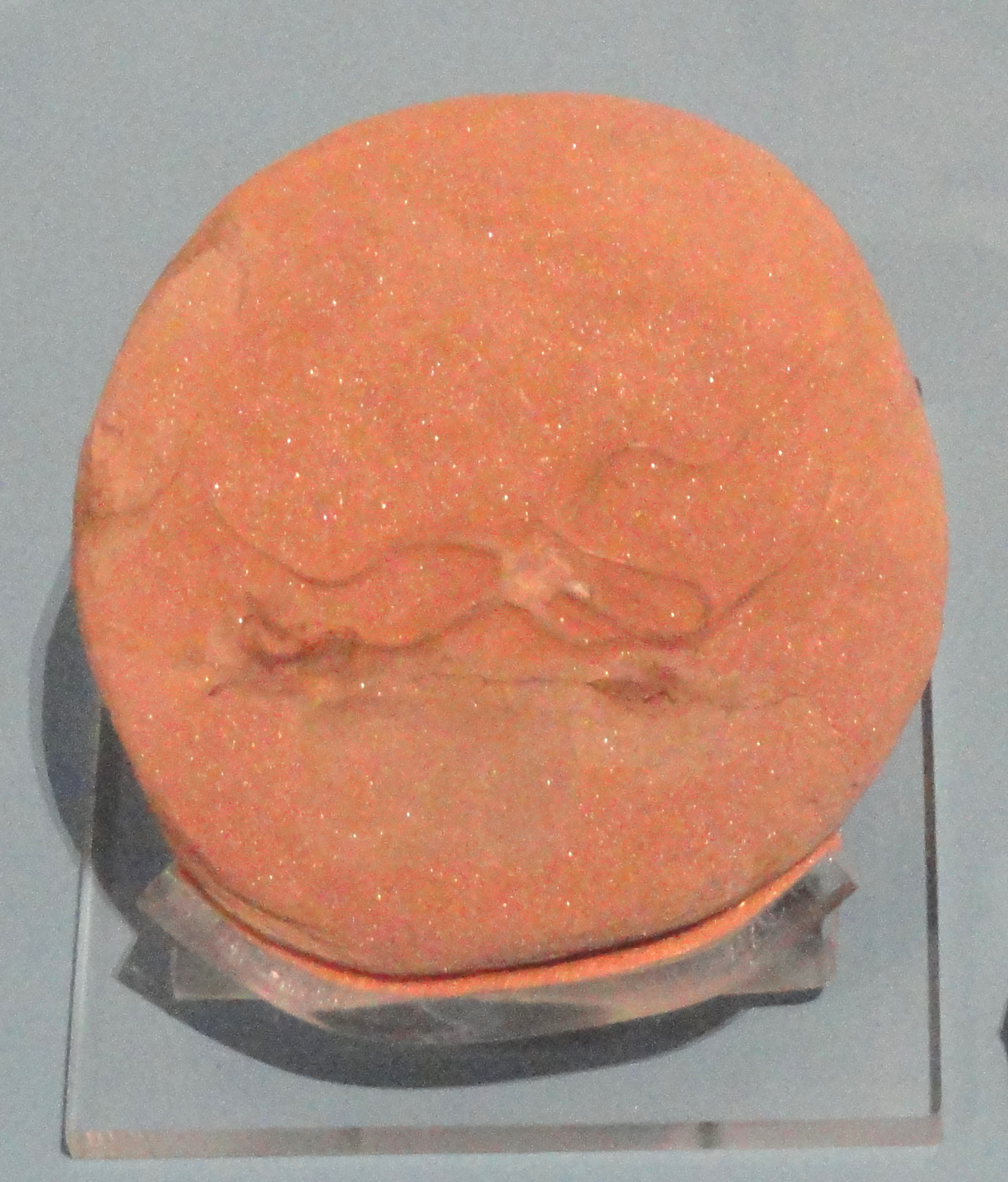
Fossile of Ophioderma tenuibrachiata (Early Jurassic)

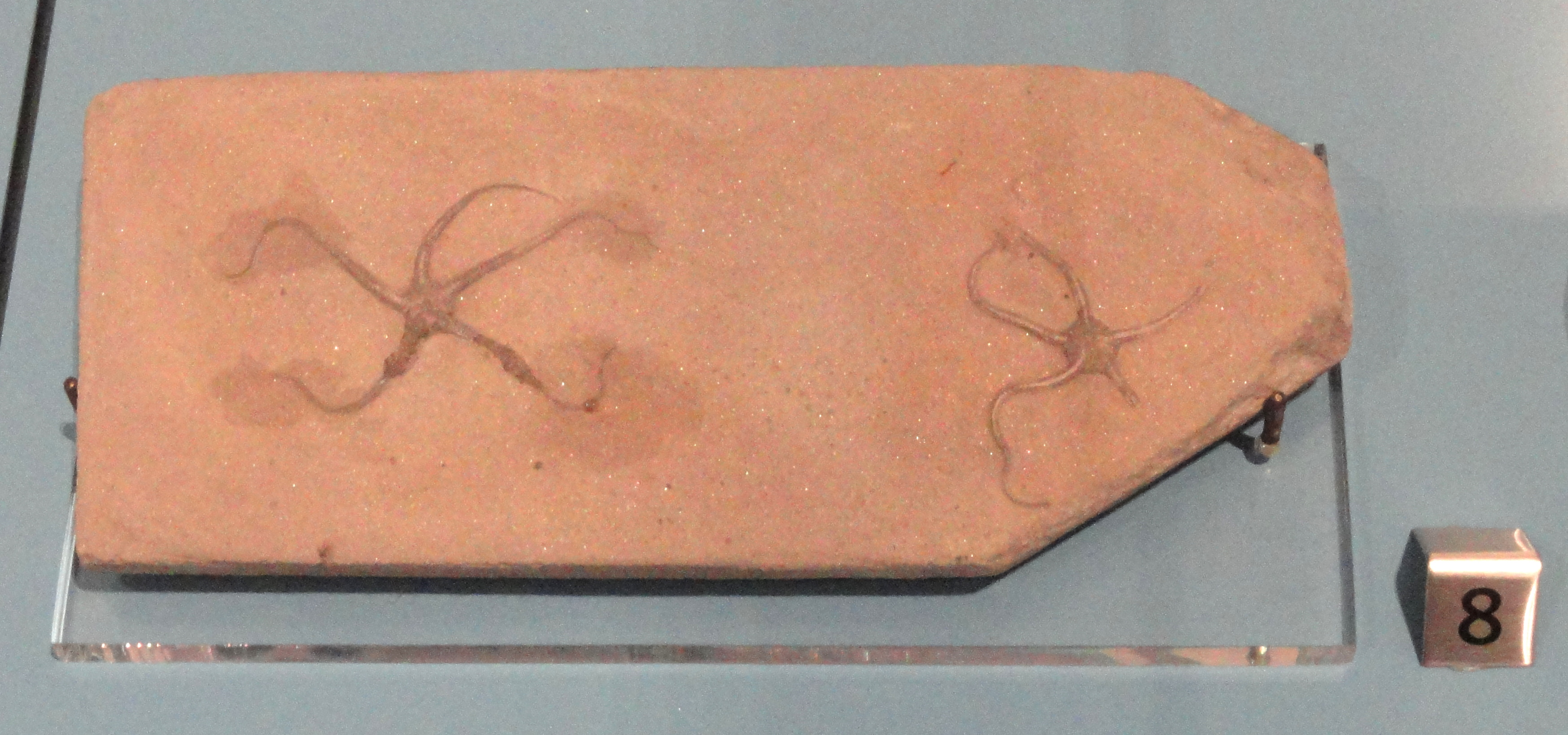
Fossile of Ophioderma egertoni (Early Jurassic)
