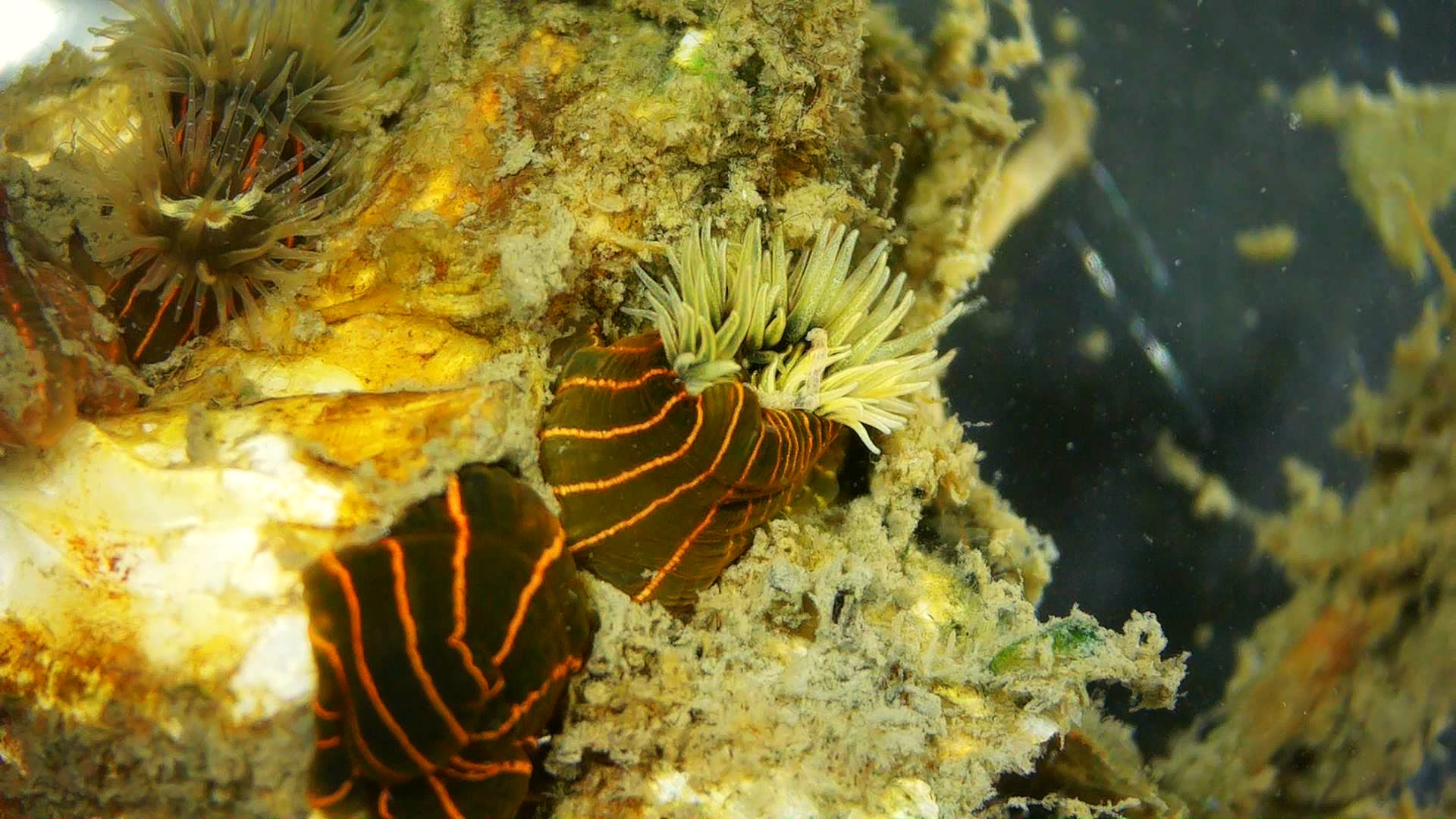

Scientific classification
- Kingdom: Animalia
- Phylum: Cnidaria
- Subphylum: Anthozoa
- Class: Hexacorallia
- Order: Actiniaria
- Family: Diadumenidae
- Genus: Diadumene
- Species: D. lineata

Binomial name
- Diadumene lineata Verrill, 1870

Synonyms
- Aiptasiomorpha luciae (Verrill, 1899); Diadumene luciae (Verrill, 1869); Haliplanella lineata (Verrill, 1869); Haliplanella luciae (Verrill, 1898); Sagartia davisi Torrey, 1904; Sagartia lineata Verrill, 1869; Sagartia luciae Verrill, 1898

= Diadumene lineata =

Orange-striped sea anemone

Species of sea anemone

Diadumene lineata, the orange-striped green sea anemone, has several morphotypes which have been described multiple times.

== Description ==
This is a smaller species, measuring approximately 3.5 centimeters in diameter across its tentacles and 3 centimeters in height. Its central column is green-gray to brown color and smooth. The column, which houses the gastro vascular central cavity extends from the mouth to the attached base called the pedal disc. It does not always have vertical stripes, which can be orange or white. There are 50 to 100 slender and tapered tentacles which are able to retract completely into the column. They are commonly transparent and can be gray or light green with white flecks (Christine 2001). Many morphs occur for this species: Sagartia lineata (Verill, 1869 Hong Kong), Diadumene lineata (Verill 1870); Diaumene luciae (Stephenson, 1925); Haliplanella luciae (Hand, 1955); Properly named D. lineata (Hand 1989). In a single population there may be one or several functioning variations of the species description (Hand, 1955b; Williams, 1973b). Population studies exhibiting morphs of several different communities were done along with personal communication from the following individuals (Parker 1919, Allee 1923, Stephenson 1935). An un-striped population was found by D.F. Dunn in San Francisco Bay, California. Two morphs were found, one with twelve orange stripes on a green-brown column and one with 48 paired white stripes on a green column. These population studies were done in Indian Field Creek, Virginia and Barnstable Town Dock, Massachusetts by C.P. Mangum.

== Distribution and ecology ==
This species originated from the Pacific coast of Asia, but is currently found in the Northern Hemisphere. It has been found in Japan, the Gulf of Mexico (Verrill), Plymouth and Wells, Norfolk, England (R.B. Williams), Western Europe, the Mediterranean Sea, the Suez Canal, Malaysia (D. F. Dunn, California Academy of Sciences), and on the east and west coasts of North America (L. L. Minasian, Myers 1977, Stephenson 1935, Sassaman and Mangum 1970, Shick, J. H. Ting 1983, Uchida 1932, G. M. Watson, W. E. Zamer 1999). It has also been found in Hawaii and other sites of the Pacific Ocean. Recently it has appeared in Argentina and other localities of South America. Distribution away from Asia may have occurred by attachment to ship bottoms, oyster shipments, and seaweed. These anemones target ecosystems that are barren landscapes or with low species diversity. Appearing suddenly, populations quickly proliferate and colonize zones and alter natural balances. Within short durations, they are known to vanish from the area quickly with no warning (Stephenson 1953). It is a member of the fouling community, but does not cause significant economic impacts.

== Eurytolerance ==
Diadumene anemones display high tolerance to inter-tidal exposure and drying out in extreme summer heat. They form encystments when locked in freezing climates. They acclimatize to severely low salinities. In Blue Hill Flls, Maine 100 percent survival of a population of 4000 individuals was observed after two weeks of temperatures of 1.0°- 27.5 °C, and salinities of 0.5 - 35‰.

== Genetic character ==
Physiological races, which are eurytolerant (tolerant of extreme environments) diverse species, that exhibit different resistances in remote and secluded places. This species demonstrates strong genetic selection of certain physiological strains (Prosser 1957).

== Reproduction ==
While this sea anemone can reproduce sexually, it normally reproduces asexually by longitudinal fission. The asexual process is where a new polyp develops from a portion of the original polyp after pulling away (anemone splits in half). In many localities, there is little or no genetic variability between individual polyps as they are all clones of each other. This leads to a situation where apparently thriving populations can suddenly vanish from a locality. This happens because there is a lack of genetic variability among the population, and as the limits of tolerance of some parameter is approached, there is a sudden incidence of mortality among the whole population.

== Catch/feeding tentacles ==
Anemones, like all cnidarians, have nematocysts, which are stinging organelles used for defense and catching prey. Studies of nematocyst development on tentacle tips of this and several species reveals several different stages of tentacle morphology (Watson and Mariscal, Florida State University 1983). Comparisons to hydrozoans in terms of growth stages or bulb pulses of tentacle development are explained by growth of individual tentacles by widening or an increasing length of the column (Campbell 1980). The nematocysts are found on both catch tentacles and feeding tentacles. The catch tentacles used for aggression and capturing of prey have larger length and width than feeding tentacles, which aid in the capture of food. Feeding tentacles are displaced by catch tentacles during growth cycles, and migrate towards the central column. This is commonly found in aggressive sea anemones who share food sources. During aggressive interactions, individual catch tentacles will strike a non-clone-mate in the upper column or tentacles. They break when withdrawn, separating the nematocyst—containing tip from the remaining tentacle. This can have life-threatening consequences, such as necrosis (cellular death) for the struck organism.

== Gallery ==
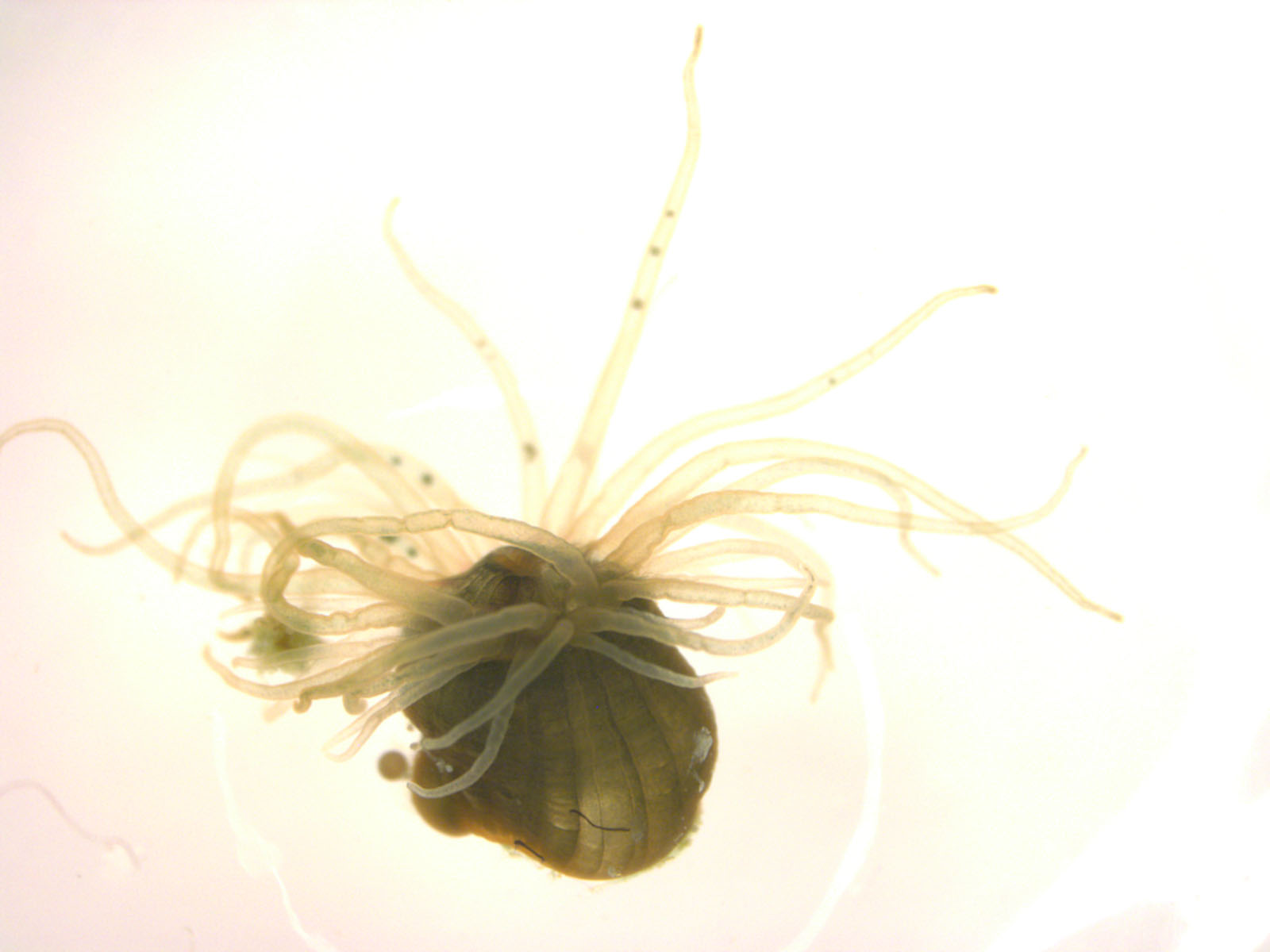
A small specimen

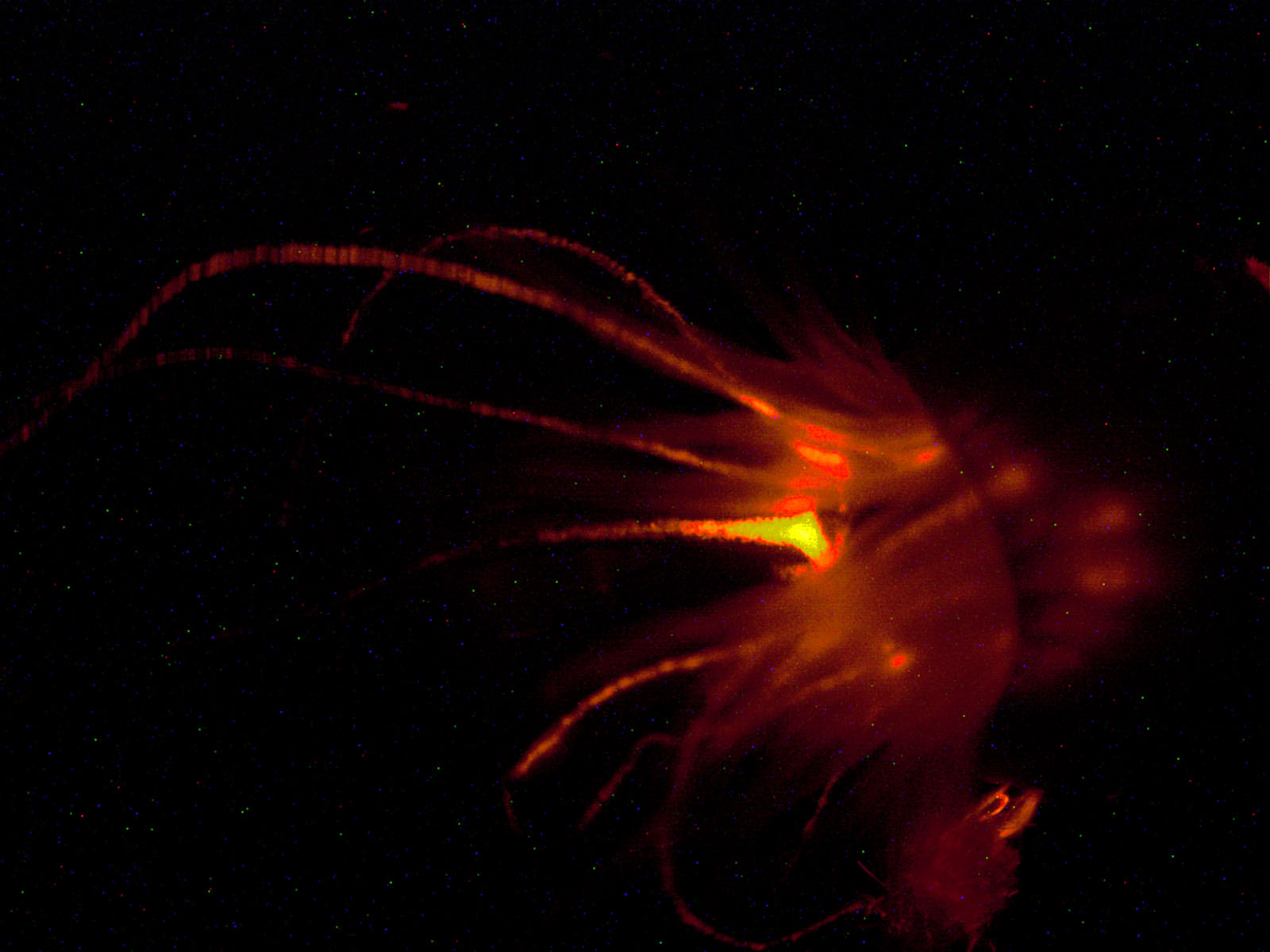
A fluorescent anemone

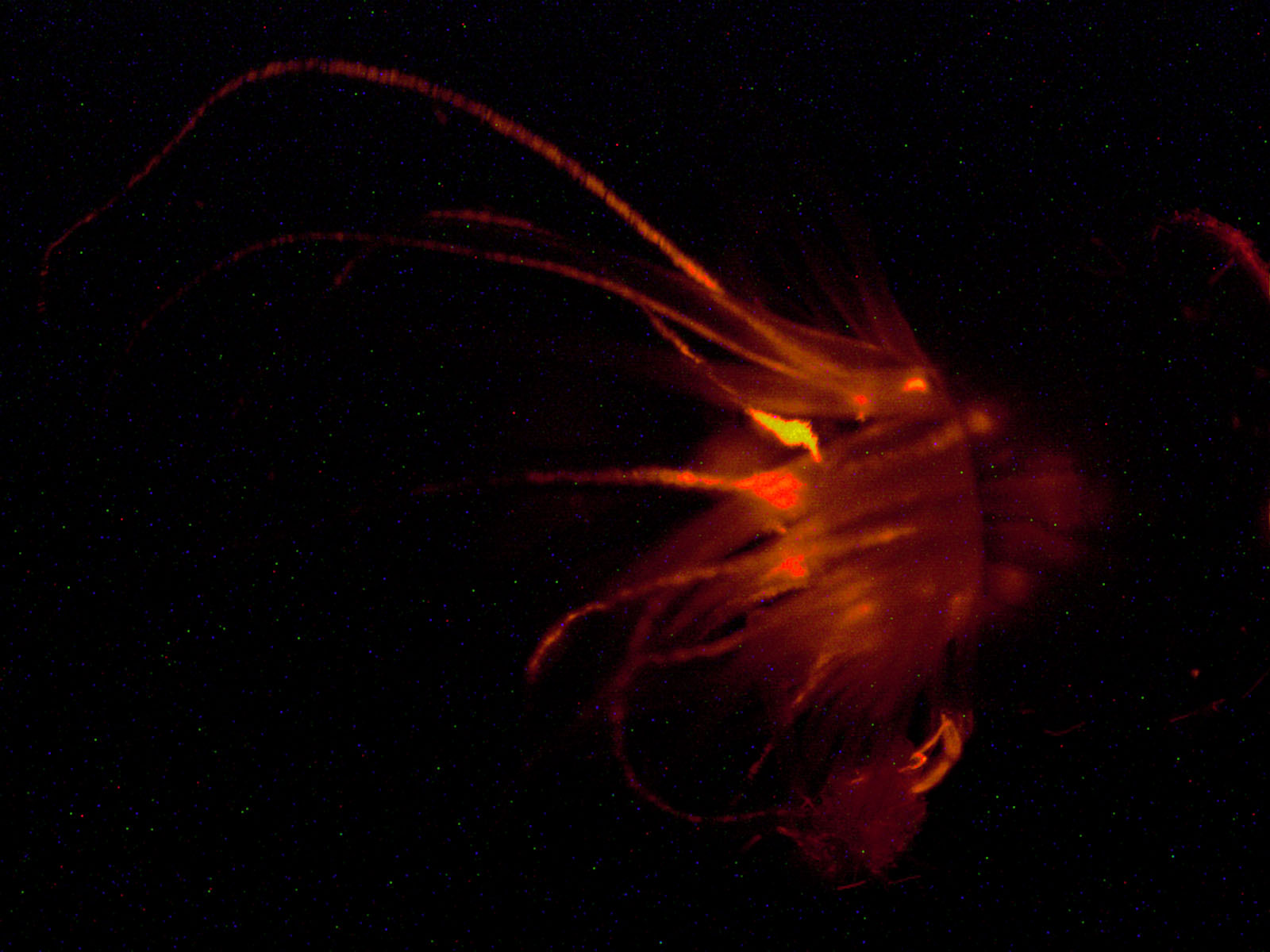
More Fluorescence

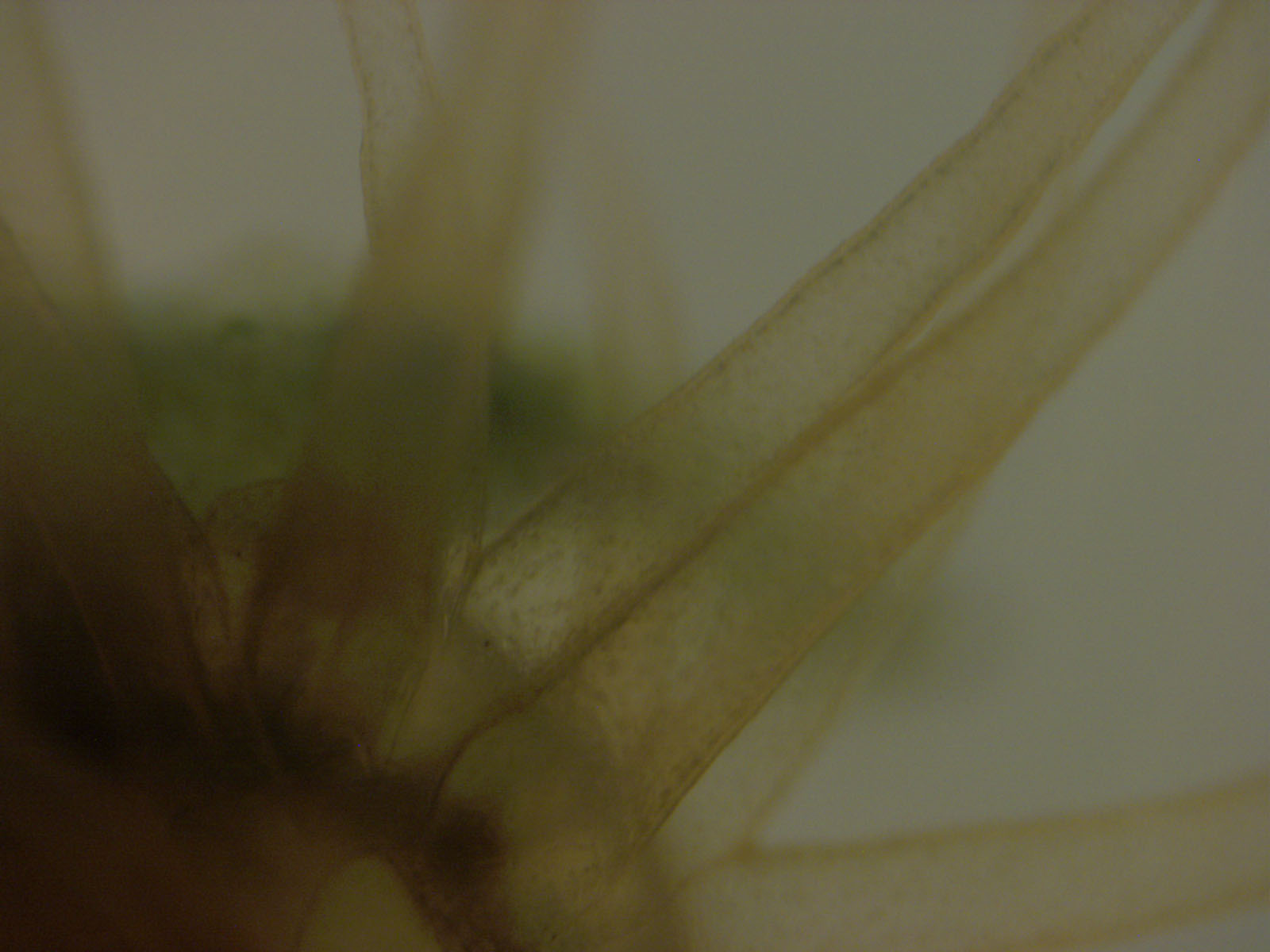
A tentacle's contents

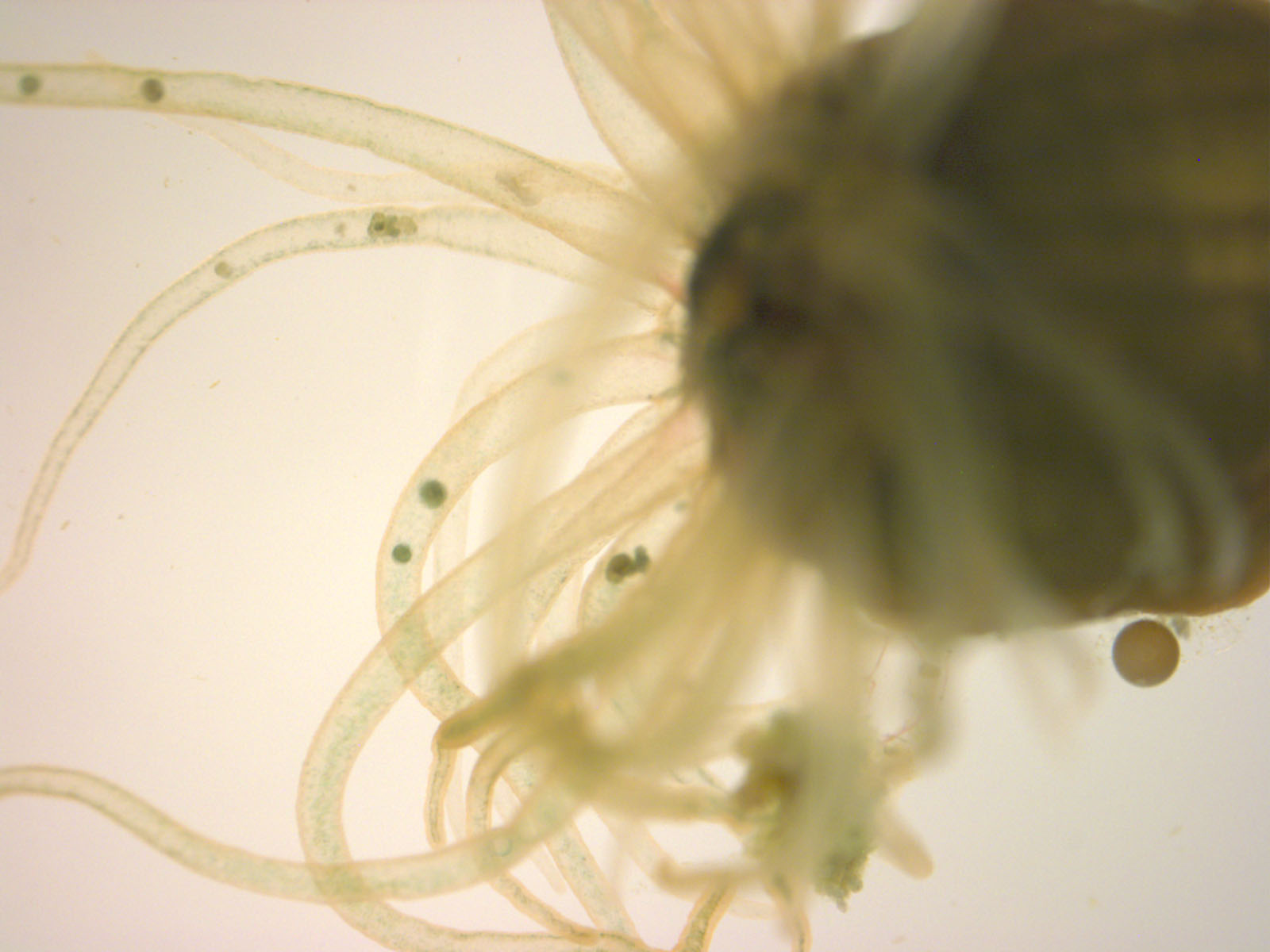
Close-up of a tentacle
