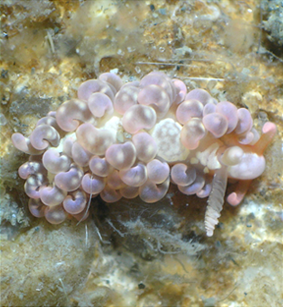
- Spurilla neapolitana, Cap Ferret, France.

Scientific classification
- Kingdom: Animalia
- Phylum: Mollusca
- Class: Gastropoda
- Order: Nudibranchia
- Suborder: Aeolidacea
- Family: Aeolidiidae
- Genus: Spurilla; Bergh, 1868

Type species
- Eolis neapolitana Delle Chiaje, 1841

= Spurilla =

Genus of gastropods

Spurilla is a genus of sea slugs, aeolid nudibranchs, marine gastropod molluscs in the family Aeolidiidae.

== General characterisrics ==
(Original description in Latin) The rhinophores are deeply perfoliate. The foot is rounded anteriorly, with its angles slightly projecting. The anterior dorsal papillae are arranged in series and connected in pairs by curved bridges.

The masticatory margin of the mandible bears a series of extremely minute denticles along its anterior portion.

The radular teeth are arranged in a single row and are comb-shaped, with the cutting edge medially incised.

== Species ==
Species within the genus Spurilla include:

- Spurilla braziliana MacFarland, 1909
- Spurilla croisicensis (Labbé, 1923)
- Spurilla dupontae Carmona, Lei, Pola, Gosliner, Valdés & Cervera, 2014
- Spurilla neapolitana (delle Chiaje, 1844) - type species of the genus
- Spurilla sargassicola Bergh, 1871

Species brought into synonymy

- Spurilla alba (Risbec, 1928): synonym of Aeolidiella alba Risbec, 1928
- Spurilla australis Rudman, 1982: synonym of Baeolidia australis (Rudman, 1982)
- Spurilla caerulescens (Laurillard, 1830):synonym of Berghia coerulescens (Laurillard, 1830)
- Spurilla chromosoma Cockerell & Eliot, 1905: synonym of Anteaeolidiella chromosoma (Cockerell & Eliot, 1905)
- Spurilla creutzbergi Er. Marcus & Ev. Marcus, 1970: synonym of Berghia creutzbergi Er. Marcus & Ev. Marcus, 1970
- Spurilla faustina (Bergh, 1900): synonym of Baeolidia faustina (Bergh, 1900)
- Spurilla macleayi (Angas, 1864): synonym of Baeolidia macleayi (Angas, 1864)
- Spurilla major (Eliot, 1903): synonym of Baeolidia moebii Bergh, 1888
- Spurilla onubensis Carmona, Lei, Pola, Gosliner, Valdés & Cervera, 2014: synonym of Spurilla croisicensis (Labbé, 1923)
- Spurilla orientalis Bergh, 1905: synonym of Baeolidia orientalis Bergh, 1905
- Spurilla salaamica Rudman, 1982: synonym of Baeolidia salaamica (Rudman, 1982)
- Spurilla vayssierei Garcia J.C. & Cervera, 1985: synonym of Spurilla neapolitana (Delle Chiaje, 1841)
- Spurilla verrucicornis (A. Costa, 1867): synonym of Berghia verrucicornis (A. Costa, 1867)
