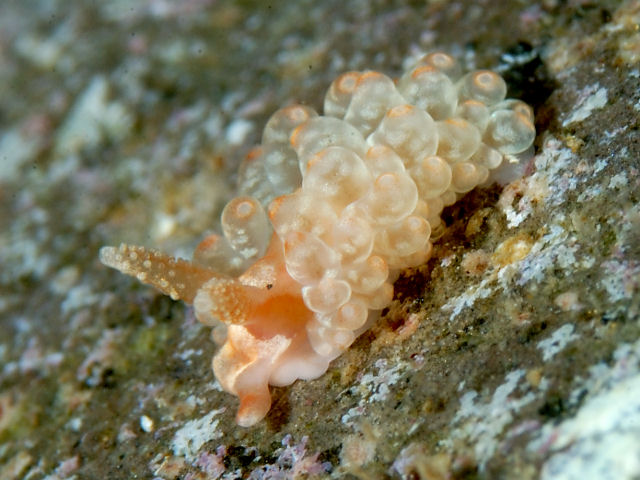
- Baeolidia salaamica

Scientific classification
- Kingdom: Animalia
- Phylum: Mollusca
- Class: Gastropoda
- Order: Nudibranchia
- Suborder: Aeolidacea
- Family: Aeolidiidae
- Genus: Baeolidia; Bergh, 1888

Type species
- Baeolidia moebii Bergh, 1888

= Baeolidia =

Genus of gastropods

Baeolidia is a genus of aeolid nudibranchs, marine gastropod molluscs in the family Aeolidiidae.

== Species ==
Species in the genus Baeolidia include:

- Baeolidia australis (Rudman, 1982)
- Baeolidia chaka (Gosliner, 1985)
- Baeolidia cryoporos Bouchet, 1977
- Baeolidia dela (Er. Marcus & Ev. Marcus, 1960)
- Baeolidia gracilis Carmona, Pola, Gosliner & Cervera, 2014
- Baeolidia japonica Baba, 1933
- Baeolidia lunaris Carmona, Pola, Gosliner & Cervera, 2014
- Baeolidia macleayi (Angas, 1864)
- Baeolidia major Eliot, 1903
- Baeolidia moebii Bergh, 1888
- Baeolidia quoyi Pruvot-Fol, 1934
- Baeolidia rieae Carmona, Pola, Gosliner & Cervera, 2014
- Baeolidia salaamica (Rudman, 1982)
- Baeolidia scottjohnsoni Carmona, Pola, Gosliner & Cervera, 2014
- Baeolidia variabilis Carmona, Pola, Gosliner & Cervera, 2014

Species brought into synonymy

- Baeolidia benteva Er. Marcus, 1958: synonym of Anteaeolidiella benteva (Er. Marcus, 1958)
- Baeolidia fusiformis Baba, 1949: synonym of Limenandra fusiformis (Baba, 1949)
- Baeolidia harrietae (Rudman, 1982): synonym of Aeolidiopsis harrietae Rudman, 1982
- Baeolidia major Elliot, 1903: synonym of Baeolidia moebii Bergh, 1888
- Baeolidia nodosa (Haefelfinger & Stamm, 1958): synonym of Limenandra nodosa Haefelfinger & Stamm, 1958
- Baeolidia palythoae Gosliner, 1985: synonym of Aeolidiopsis palythoae (Gosliner, 1985) (superseded combination)
- Baeolidia ransoni (Pruvot-Fol, 1956): synonym of Aeolidiopsis ransoni Pruvot-Fol, 1956
