= Spurilla sargassicola =

Scientific classification
- Kingdom: Animalia
- Phylum: Mollusca
- Class: Gastropoda
- Order: Nudibranchia
- Suborder: Aeolidacea
- Family: Aeolidiidae
- Genus: Spurilla
- Species: S. sargassicola

Binomial name
- Spurilla sargassicola Bergh, 1871

Synonyms
- Facelina sargassicola Bergh, 1861 unaccepted (nomen nudum)

Species of gastropod

Spurilla sargassicola is a species of sea slug, an aeolid nudibranch. It is a shell-less marine gastropod mollusc in the family Aeolidiidae.

== Distribution ==
Three specimens of this species were available. They had recently been collected by Prof. Krøyer from the “Sargasso Sea” on 23 July 1844.

== Description ==
(Original description in German) The examined specimens measured approximately 12 mm in length, 2.5 mm in height, and 3–4.5 mm in width. The head, papillae, and foot were brownish. The dorsum and sides were of a similar but much paler colour. The sides exhibited a fine whitish reticulation, which became considerably more pronounced dorsally and in the nuchal region (back of the neck) . The papillae were covered with whitish spots, which were also present on the posterior portion of the dorsal keel.

The body was generally somewhat compressed and slender. The head was of moderate size, and the tentacles were fairly long. The rhinophores were short and club-shaped, somewhat compressed, and very strongly and beautifully perfoliate. Their anterior surface bore approximately 20 alternating broader and narrower lamellae. On the anterior face, the broader lamellae were particularly well developed and completely concealed the narrower ones. On the posterior face, this difference was less pronounced; there, however, a third type of lamella was present. These lamellae were still smaller and did not extend as far as the middle of the anterior surface. Consequently, the number of lamellae was greater on the posterior face than on the anterior one. The eyes were not visible through the tissues.

Anteriorly, the dorsum gradually merged into the head; posteriorly, it continued beyond the foot as a keel. It was fairly convex, but the papillae occurred only along the lateral portions of the dorsum. On each side, they were arranged in seven double rows: in each case, two rows were positioned slightly closer together and connected to one another either angularly or in an arc.¹ The first arch of papillae lay far forward, almost adjacent to the head and external to the rhinophores. The succeeding arches were separated from one another by almost equal intervals; only the two posterior-most arches stood closer together, the last forming merely a short curve.

The total number of papillae in the rows was rather small. Usually, the anterior branch of each arch contained one or two more papillae than the posterior branch. Each branch of the first arch contained five papillae; each branch of the second and third arches contained five to six, occasionally up to eight; the fourth contained four to six, the fifth three to four, the sixth two to four, and the seventh two to three papillae.

Overall, the papillae increased in size from the anterior end to the middle of the body and then decreased in size towards the posterior end. Within each row of papillae, they increased in size from the outside inwards. The smallest measured approximately 0.5 mm, the next-largest 1.3 mm, and the largest 3.3 mm in length. The papillae were robust and lanceolate, somewhat obliquely compressed, with their sharp edge directed inwards, and were often curved into an S-shape.

Only the outermost papillae were more rounded. The hepatic lobes filled the cavities of the papillae so completely that the surface of the latter was sometimes rendered quite knobby.

The dorsum passed without a sharp boundary into the low lateral regions. The genital papilla was situated behind the lower portion of the posterior branch of the first arch of papillae. The anus lay only slightly farther posteriorly, approximately midway between the branches of the second arch. It formed a rounded, projecting papilla with a central depression. In one specimen, the renal pore was visible below and beside the anus.

The foot was fairly narrow and gradually tapered towards the posterior end. Its anterior extremity was short and rounded, with an indication of a small median notch, a pronounced groove, and short, pointed corners.

Nervous system and eyes: In the central nervous system, the olfactory ganglia were conspicuously large, measuring approximately one-third the size of the cerebrovisceral ganglia. They gave off two strong nerves that entered the rhinophores. The buccal ganglia had a short, oval outline and were scarcely half as large as the olfactory ganglia; their commissure was very short. The gastro-oesophageal ganglia were small and consisted chiefly of one or two large cells, approximately 0.065 mm in diameter, around which several smaller cells were clustered.

The cornea of the eye was fairly large, and the lens was yellowish. The pigment was black and not particularly abundant.

Pharynx and jaws: The pharynx was somewhat compressed, especially anteriorly. It was approximately 2.5 mm long, up to 1.5 mm wide, and up to about 0.67 mm high. The anterior half of its dorsal surface was slightly convex, whereas the posterior half was strongly oblique and hollowed out. At the posterior end there was a short median incision between the two jaw muscles .

The lateral surfaces descended steeply towards the short and narrow ventral surface. The anterior end sloped sharply downwards and backwards; it was covered by the elongated labial disc and, above this, by the musculus connectivus. The jaw musculature was fairly contracted, and the secondary buccal cavity was consequently rather spacious.

The mandibles (Figs. 14–16) were generally similar to those of Spurilla neapolitana, except that the ridge on the outer side of the hinge was weaker and less prominent. The substance of the mandibles was thin and pale horn-yellow, becoming brownish in the hinge region. Their shape was rather oval, though truncated dorsally and posteriorly. On the inner side, the hinge was of the usual three-ridged form. The masticatory process projected only slightly downwards and was short.

Along approximately the anterior half of its length, extending as far as the hinge, the masticatory margin bore a single row of extremely fine, inwardly directed, pointed denticles, measuring up to approximately 0.0127 mm in height. Further posteriorly, the denticulation gradually became less distinct and passed into a fine transverse crenulation of the margin. At the extreme posterior end, the masticatory margin appeared merely to be finely striated longitudinally.

The tongue was short and somewhat hollowed along its lower margin. The radular sheath was not externally visible on the pharynx. The radula occupied only the anterior end and dorsal surface of the tongue. In one specimen it contained nine tooth plates, and in the other fourteen. Beneath the radular cover and within the sheath there were a further four developed and two undeveloped plates, giving a total of approximately 15–20 tooth plates.

The tooth plates were very pale horn-yellow, becoming more distinctly yellow in the basal region. Overall, they were more strongly curved than those of the Mediterranean species. They increased rather rapidly in size: the first tooth plate measured approximately 0.06 mm in width, the fifth 0.142 mm, the tenth 0.18 mm, and the eleventh 0.20 mm. The fifth tooth plate was approximately 0.05 mm high and the seventh 0.06 mm.

The median incision of the cutting edge was very distinct. Along the midline there were one or two short denticles, although occasionally there was merely a trace of one, or none at all. On either side of the cutting edge, the anterior tooth plates bore 13–14 long denticles. Their number gradually increased on the succeeding tooth plates, reaching 24–26, and rarely 28, towards the posterior end of the sheath. The number of denticles was usually the same on both sides, a feature by which this species differed strikingly from the Mediterranean species. The cells of the short radular pulp reached a length of up to 0.044 mm and were generally distinctly transversely oval.

The salivary glands were of the usual form. The cnidosacs were elongated and pear-shaped. The stinging threads were rod-shaped, measuring 0.029–0.04 to 0.08 mm in length, and were either straight or curved. Very similar stinging threads occurred in great numbers in the buccal cavity.
