= Cerberilla tanna =

Scientific classification
- Kingdom: Animalia
- Phylum: Mollusca
- Class: Gastropoda
- Order: Nudibranchia
- Suborder: Aeolidacea
- Family: Aeolidiidae
- Genus: Cerberilla
- Species: C. tanna

Binomial name
- Cerberilla tanna Ev. Marcus & Er. Marcus, 1960

Species of gastropod

Cerberilla tanna is a species of sea slug, an aeolid nudibranch, a marine heterobranch mollusc in the family Aeolidiidae.

== Distribution ==
This species was described from northeastern Brazil.

== Description ==
All Cerberilla species have a broad foot and the cerata are long and numerous, arranged in transverse rows across the body. This species is translucent with opaque white pigment on the cerata and oral tentacles. There is a brown spot on the upper surface of each of the cerata. The distinguishing features of this species are discussed in relation to Cerberilla chavezi by Hermosillo & Valdés, (2007).

The maximum recorded body length is 25 mm.

== Ecology ==
Minimum recorded depth is 0 m. Maximum recorded depth is 6 m.

Species of Cerberilla live on and in sandy substrates where they burrow beneath the surface and feed on burrowing sea anemones.
