= Baeolidia lunaris =

Scientific classification
- Kingdom: Animalia
- Phylum: Mollusca
- Class: Gastropoda
- Order: Nudibranchia
- Suborder: Aeolidacea
- Family: Aeolidiidae
- Genus: Baeolidia
- Species: B. lunaris

Binomial name
- Baeolidia lunaris Carmona, Pola, Gosliner & Cervera, 2014

Species of gastropod

Baeolidia lunaris is a species of sea slug, an aeolid nudibranch. It is a marine gastropod mollusc in the family Aeolidiidae found in Tanzania.

== Distribution ==
This species was described from a specimen found in shallow water feeding on Zoanthids at Mana Huanja Island, Mtwara Region, Tanzania.

== Description ==
Baeolidia lunaris has a translucent brownish body covered with fine iridescent opaque white spots. The rhinophores are approximately equal in length to the oral tentacles and are densely covered by elongate papillae. The rhinophores are translucent brown with small white spots and white tips. The oral tentacles are short and slender, tapering near apices, also translucent brown in colour. The cerata are moderately long, flattened and leaf-like and curved inwardly. They are the same colour as the body, but a little bit darker. There is a crescent-shaped white spot on anterior side of cerata, close to the base.
