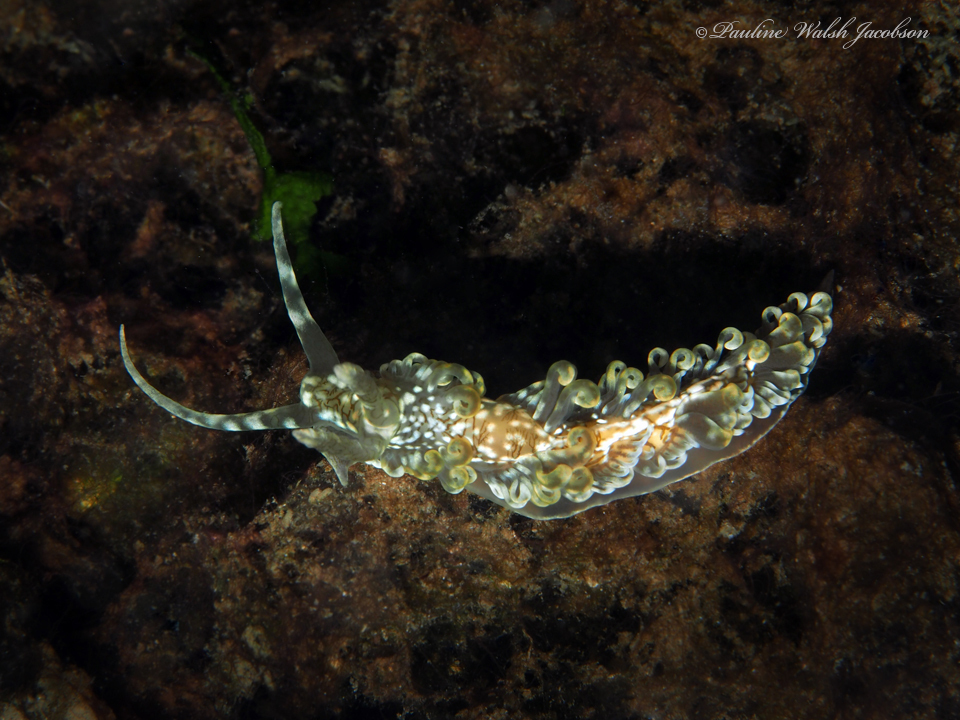

Scientific classification
- Kingdom: Animalia
- Phylum: Mollusca
- Class: Gastropoda
- Order: Nudibranchia
- Suborder: Aeolidacea
- Family: Aeolidiidae
- Genus: Spurilla
- Species: S. dupontae

Binomial name
- Spurilla dupontae Carmona, Lei, Pola, Gosliner, Valdés & Cervera, 2014

= Spurilla dupontae =

Species of gastropod

Spurilla dupontae is a species of sea slug, an aeolid nudibranch. It is a shell-less marine gastropod mollusc in the family Aeolidiidae.

== Distribution ==
This species was described from two specimens collected at Stocking Island, Bahamas. It has also been reported from Martinique.

== Description ==
Spurilla dupontae has an elongate body, tapering abruptly to the tail. The body is translucent white to yellowish-brown. There is an ochre to brownish-green reticulate pattern and white spots all over the dorsum and cerata. The rhinophores, oral tentacles and foot corners have the same reticulate pattern as the body. The rhinophores are perfoliate, with white tips and 9–12 lamellae.
