= Baeolidia chaka =

Scientific classification
- Kingdom: Animalia
- Phylum: Mollusca
- Class: Gastropoda
- Order: Nudibranchia
- Suborder: Aeolidacea
- Family: Aeolidiidae
- Genus: Baeolidia
- Species: B. chaka

Binomial name
- Baeolidia chaka (Gosliner, 1985)

Synonyms
- Berghia chaka Gosliner, 1985

Species of gastropod

Baeolidia chaka, is a species of sea slug, an aeolid nudibranch. It is a marine gastropod mollusc in the family Aeolidiidae.

== Distribution ==
This species was described from two specimens collected in the intertidal zone at Jesser Point, Sodwana Bay National Park, Natal, South Africa.

== Description ==
The body of Baeolidia chaka is translucent white with a dense pattern of opaque white pigment over much of the surface. The head and the bases of the rhinophores and oral tentacles are covered with chocolate-brown pigment. Brown pigment is also present at the bases of the cerata and more diffusely on the dorsal portion of the foot. The digestive gland within the cerata is rusty brown. The cerata are ornamented with opaque white pigment, which is densest on their anterior sides and on irregular tubercles on the surfaces. The tips of the cerata are opaque white with a thin sub-apical band of chocolate brown and a wider band of opaque white.
