= Baeolidia dela =

Scientific classification
- Kingdom: Animalia
- Phylum: Mollusca
- Class: Gastropoda
- Order: Nudibranchia
- Suborder: Aeolidacea
- Family: Aeolidiidae
- Genus: Baeolidia
- Species: B. dela

Binomial name
- Baeolidia dela (Er. Marcus & Ev. Marcus, 1960)

Synonyms
- Berghia dela Er. Marcus & Ev. Marcus, 1960

Species of gastropod

Baeolidia dela is a species of sea slug, an aeolid nudibranch. It is a marine gastropod mollusc in the family Aeolidiidae.

== Distribution ==
This species was described from Addu Atoll, Maldives.

== Description ==
Baeolidia dela is known only from its internal and external anatomy as it was described from a preserved specimen. The colouration of this species is unknown. The shape of the cerata is described as cylindrical and this could be the distinctive feature that may help to identify this species if Baeolidia specimens matching this description are seen in the Maldives.
