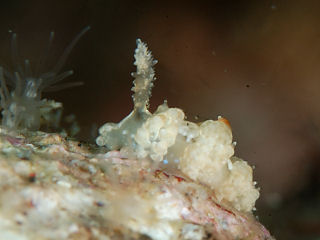
- Baeolidia japonica

Scientific classification
- Kingdom: Animalia
- Phylum: Mollusca
- Class: Gastropoda
- Order: Nudibranchia
- Suborder: Aeolidacea
- Family: Aeolidiidae
- Genus: Baeolidia
- Species: B. japonica

Binomial name
- Baeolidia japonica Baba, 1933

= Baeolidia japonica =

Species of gastropod

Baeolidia harrietae is a species of sea slug, an aeolid nudibranch. It is a marine gastropod mollusc in the family Aeolidiidae.

== Distribution ==
This species was described from Tomioka Bay, Japan, 32°32′0″N 130°3′0″E. It is also known from Shimoda, the Ryukyu Islands, Indonesia, the Marshall Islands, the Philippines, and Papua New Guinea.

== Description ==
Baeolidia japonica has two colour forms. The body is translucent white or brown. The cerata are brown with white spots, or entirely covered with white pigment. The rhinophores have elongate papillae on all sides.
