= Baeolidia rieae =

Scientific classification
- Kingdom: Animalia
- Phylum: Mollusca
- Class: Gastropoda
- Order: Nudibranchia
- Suborder: Aeolidacea
- Family: Aeolidiidae
- Genus: Baeolidia
- Species: B. rieae

Binomial name
- Baeolidia rieae Carmona, Pola, Gosliner & Cervera, 2014

Species of gastropod

Baeolidia rieae is a species of sea slug, an aeolid nudibranch. It is a marine gastropod mollusc in the family Aeolidiidae.

== Distribution ==
This species was described from a specimen found in 7 m (23 ft) depth at Amami Ōshima Island, Japan.

== Description ==
Baeolidia rieae has a translucent body with mottled pale brown and pearly white surface pigmentation. The rhinophores are almost smooth with small scattered papillae. The cerata are somewhat flattened and broad near the base, abruptly tapering to a cylindrical outer half.
