= Baeolidia scottjohnsoni =

Scientific classification
- Kingdom: Animalia
- Phylum: Mollusca
- Class: Gastropoda
- Order: Nudibranchia
- Suborder: Aeolidacea
- Family: Aeolidiidae
- Genus: Baeolidia
- Species: B. scottjohnsoni

Binomial name
- Baeolidia scottjohnsoni Carmona, Pola, Gosliner & Cervera, 2014

Species of gastropod

Baeolidia scottjohnsoni, is a species of sea slug, an aeolid nudibranch. It is a marine gastropod mollusc in the family Aeolidiidae found in the Marshall Islands and Hawaii, United States.

== Distribution ==
The holotype of this species was collected at a depth of 10 m (33 ft) at Enewetak Pinnacle, Kwajalein Atoll, Marshall Islands, 9.0133°N 167.7182°E. A second specimen from Hawaii was included in the description.

== Description ==
The body of Baeolidia scottjohnsoni is brown with a dense pattern of opaque white pigment over much of the dorsal surface. The rhinophores are stout with long papillae on the surfaces. The cerata are slightly flattened and coloured brown on the exterior faces but have conspicuous blue and white curved bands on the surfaces facing inwards over the back.
