= Baeolidia cryoporos =

Scientific classification
- Kingdom: Animalia
- Phylum: Mollusca
- Class: Gastropoda
- Order: Nudibranchia
- Suborder: Aeolidacea
- Family: Aeolidiidae
- Genus: Baeolidia
- Species: B. cryoporos

Binomial name
- Baeolidia cryoporos Bouchet, 1977

Species of gastropod

Baeolidia cryoporos is a deep-water species of sea slug, an aeolid nudibranch. It is a marine gastropod mollusc in the family Aeolidiidae.

== Distribution ==
This species was found at depths of 2,110 m (6,920 ft) in the Atlantic Ocean, at 47°33′N 08°34′W (west of France).

== Description ==
Baeolidia cryoporos is distinguished from other known Baeolidia species by living in deep, cold water and having no eyes.
