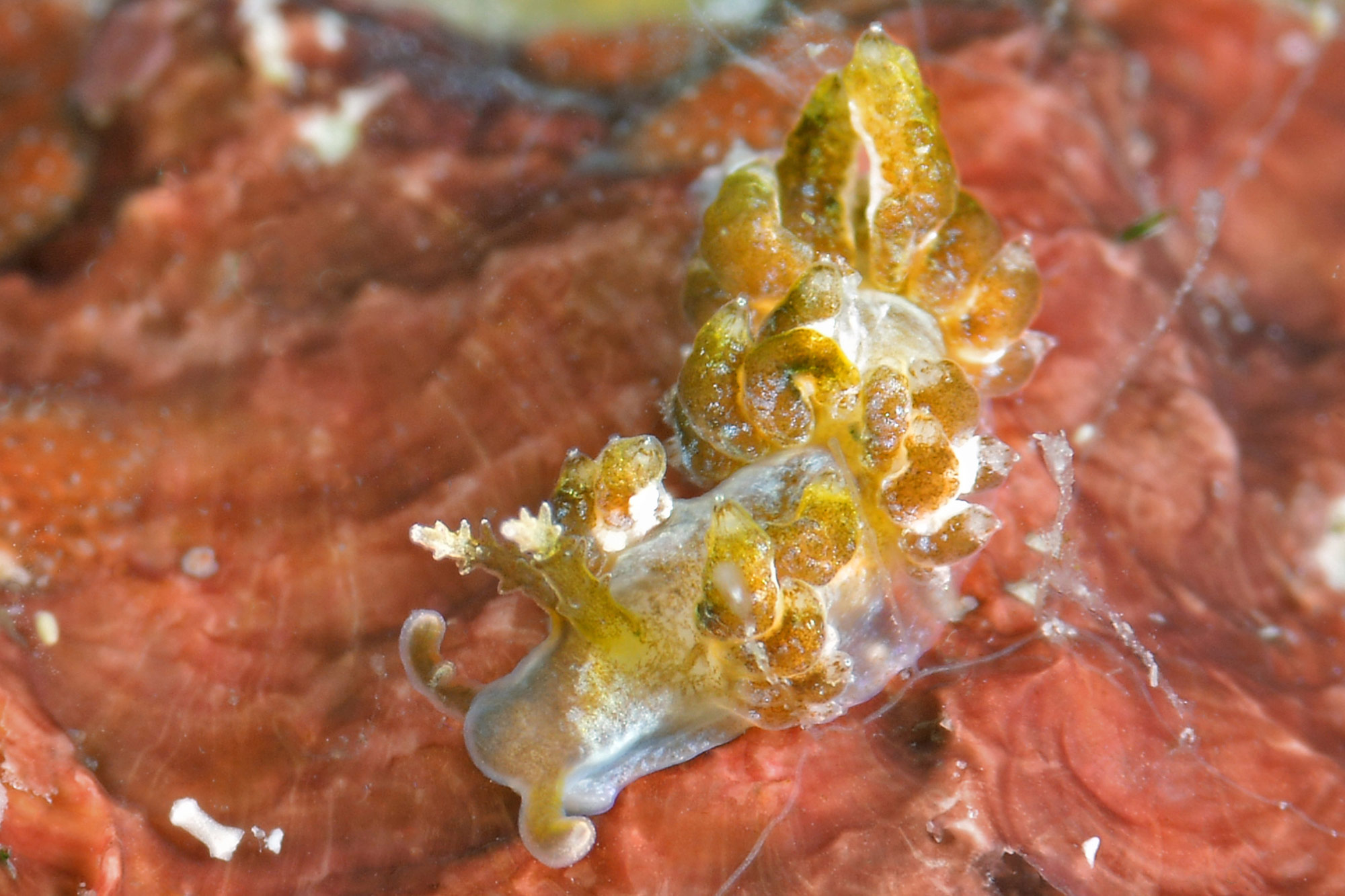
- Anilao, Philippines

Scientific classification
- Kingdom: Animalia
- Phylum: Mollusca
- Class: Gastropoda
- Order: Nudibranchia
- Suborder: Aeolidacea
- Family: Aeolidiidae
- Genus: Baeolidia
- Species: B. variabilis

Binomial name
- Baeolidia variabilis Carmona, Pola, Gosliner & Cervera, 2014

= Baeolidia variabilis =

Species of gastropod

Baeolidia variabilis is a species of sea slug, an aeolid nudibranch. It is a marine gastropod mollusc in the family Aeolidiidae found in the Philippines, the Marshall Islands and Papua New Guinea, central Indo-Pacific Ocean.

== Etymology ==
The specific name variabilis refers to the variable colour forms of this species.

== Distribution ==
The holotype of this species was collected under coral rubble in shallow water at Medio Island, Mindoro, Philippines, 13.5296°N 120.9576°E. Specimens from Papua New Guinea and Kwajalein Atoll, Marshall Islands were included in the description.

== Description ==
There are apparently two colour forms of this species. In the Marshall Islands (animals of 10–11 mm (0.39–0.43 in) in length alive) the body of Baeolidia variabilis is translucent white with brown veins on the sides and a dense pattern of opaque white pigment over much of the dorsal surface. In the Philippines (animals of 2–4 mm (0.079–0.157 in) in length preserved) the white is absent and light ochre spots occur all over the body. The rhinophores are covered basally with sparse papillae which become numerous towards the tips. The cerata are rugose with opaque white pigment on the surface and translucent regions at the tips. In the Philippines animals the white pigment on the cerata was only in the basal and posterior regions of the cerata.
