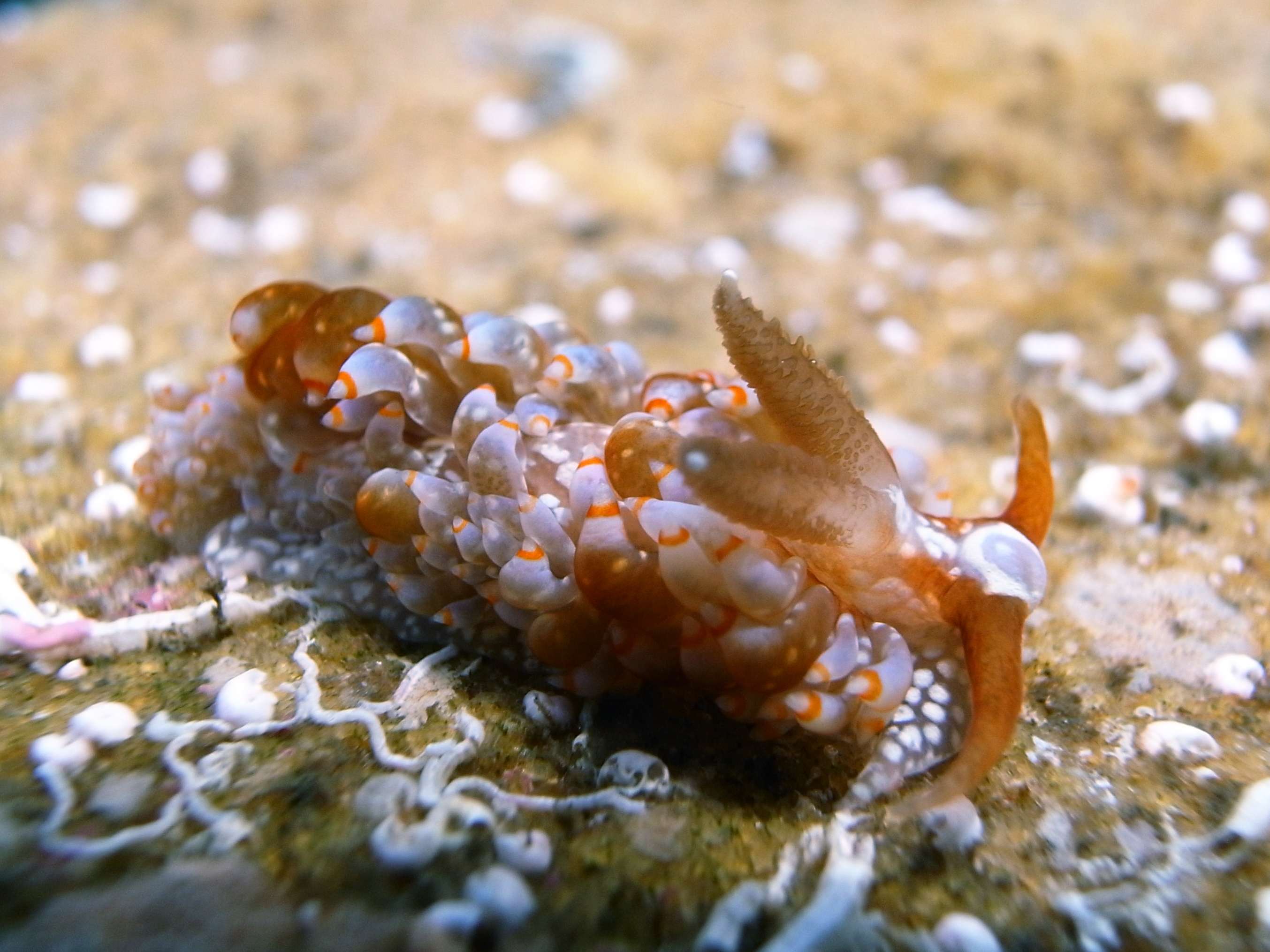

Scientific classification
- Kingdom: Animalia
- Phylum: Mollusca
- Class: Gastropoda
- Order: Nudibranchia
- Suborder: Aeolidacea
- Family: Aeolidiidae
- Genus: Baeolidia
- Species: B. australis

Binomial name
- Baeolidia australis (Rudman, 1982)

Synonyms
- Spurilla australis Rudman, 1982 basionym

= Baeolidia australis =

Species of gastropod

Baeolidia australis, is a species of sea slug, an aeolid nudibranch found from the west coast of Australia to New Zealand. It is a marine gastropod mollusc in the family Aeolidiidae.

== Distribution ==
This species was described from Long Reef, Sydney, Australia. It is reported from South Australia, Western Australia, Queensland and New South Wales, and also from northern New Zealand.

== Description ==
Baeolidia australis is distinguished from Baeolidia moebii by having a thin orange sub-apical band above a broad blue band on each ceras, which is never present in Baeolidia moebii. Baeolidia australis looks bluish whereas Baeolidia moebii is more yellow or brown. The body of Baeolidia australis also seems to have a brown and white reticulate pattern that is not found in Baeolidia moebii.
