= Baeolidia gracilis =

Scientific classification
- Kingdom: Animalia
- Phylum: Mollusca
- Class: Gastropoda
- Order: Nudibranchia
- Suborder: Aeolidacea
- Family: Aeolidiidae
- Genus: Baeolidia
- Species: B. gracilis

Binomial name
- Baeolidia gracilis Carmona, Pola, Gosliner & Cervera, 2014

Species of gastropod

Baeolidia gracilis is a species of sea slugs, an aeolid nudibranch. It is a marine gastropod mollusc in the family Aeolidiidae found in the Philippines.

== Distribution ==
This species was described from a specimen found under coral rubble in 10 m of water at Arthur's Rock, on the south-west side of Calumpang Peninsula, Maricaban Strait, Batangas Province, Luzon, Philippines.

== Description ==
Baeolidia gracilis has a translucent white body with the head and pericardium dark greyish blue. The posterior part of the notum and the cerata are ochre. There is a reticulate brown pattern close to the edges of the foot. The rhinophores are approximately equal in length to the oral tentacles and are dark greyish blue with only few moderately short papillae, mainly in posterior part.
