= Spurilla croisicensis =

Scientific classification
- Kingdom: Animalia
- Phylum: Mollusca
- Class: Gastropoda
- Order: Nudibranchia
- Suborder: Aeolidacea
- Family: Aeolidiidae
- Genus: Spurilla
- Species: S. croisicensis

Binomial name
- Spurilla croisicensis (Labbé, 1923)

Synonyms
- Aeolidiella croisicensis Labbé, 1923; Spurilla onubensis Carmona, Lei, Pola, Gosliner, Valdés & Cervera, 2014

Species of gastropod

Spurilla croisicensis is a species of sea slug, an aeolid nudibranch. It is a shell-less marine gastropod mollusc in the family Aeolidiidae.

== Distribution ==
This species was described as common at Le Croisic, France. It was redescribed under the name Spurilla onubensis.

== Description ==
Spurilla croisicensis is variable in colour, with this variation being correlated with age.
