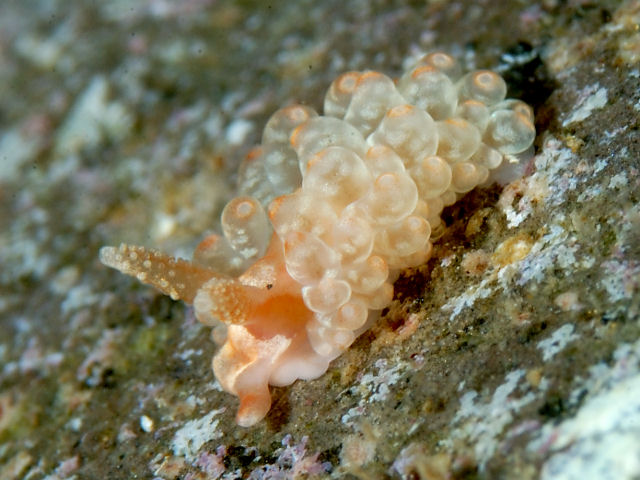

Scientific classification
- Kingdom: Animalia
- Phylum: Mollusca
- Class: Gastropoda
- Order: Nudibranchia
- Suborder: Aeolidacea
- Family: Aeolidiidae
- Genus: Baeolidia
- Species: B. salaamica

Binomial name
- Baeolidia salaamica (Rudman, 1982)

Synonyms
- Spurilla salaamica Rudman, 1982; Berghia salaamica (Rudman, 1982)

= Baeolidia salaamica =

Species of gastropod

Baeolidia salaamica, is a species of sea slug, an aeolid nudibranch. It is a marine gastropod mollusc in the family Aeolidiidae.

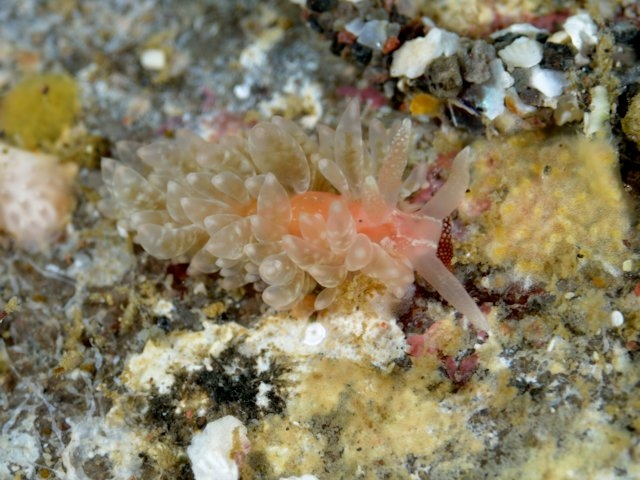
Baeolidia salaamica
