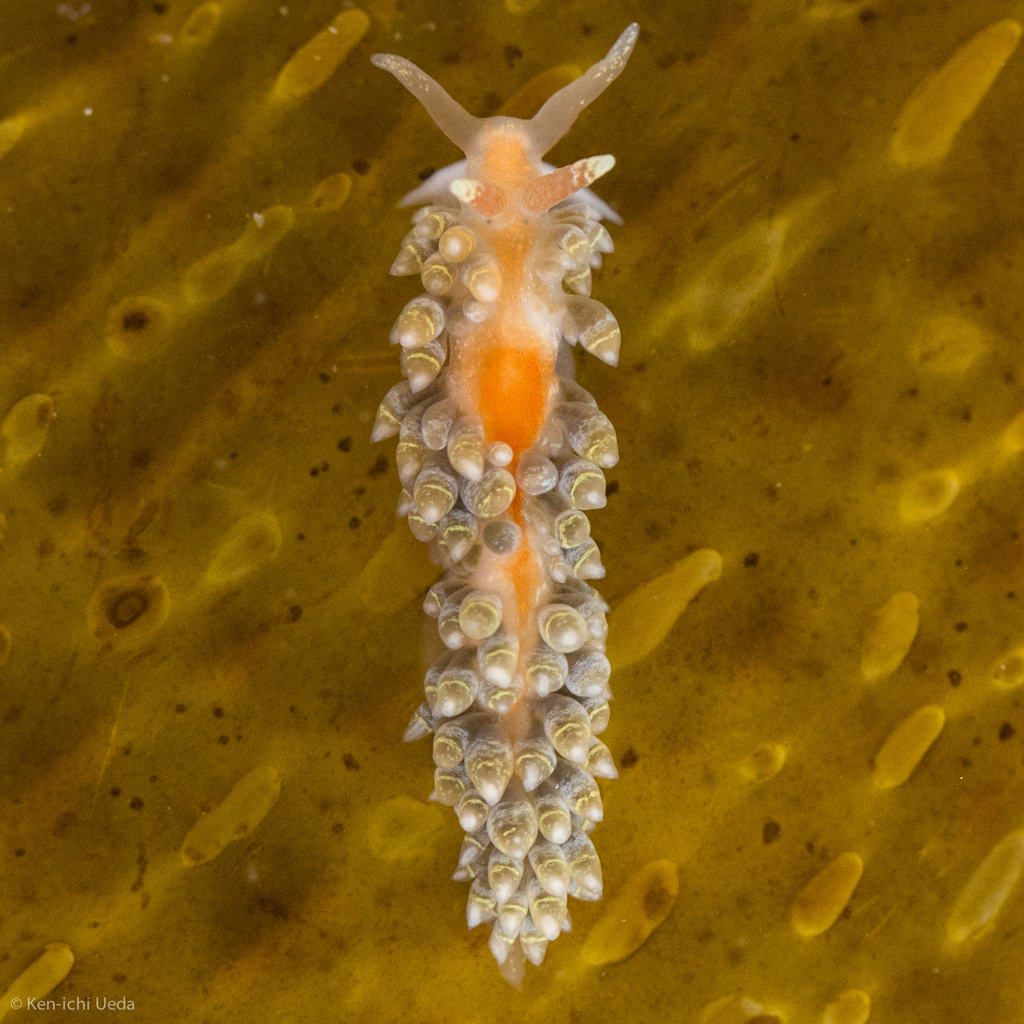

Scientific classification
- Kingdom: Animalia
- Phylum: Mollusca
- Class: Gastropoda
- Order: Nudibranchia
- Suborder: Aeolidacea
- Family: Aeolidiidae
- Genus: Baeolidia
- Species: B. macleayi

Binomial name
- Baeolidia macleayi (Angas, 1864)

Synonyms
- Aeolis macleayi Angas, 1864; Coryphella macleayi (Angas, 1864); Spurilla macleayi (Angas, 1864)

= Baeolidia macleayi =

Species of gastropod

Baeolidia macleayi is a species of sea slug, an aeolid nudibranch. It is a marine gastropod mollusc in the family Aeolidiidae.

== Distribution ==
This species was described from a specimen found in shallow water at Port Jackson, Australia. It is also reported from New Zealand.

== Description ==
Baeolidia macleayi has a translucent brownish body covered with small, irregular opaque white spots and some orange patches over the pericardium and down the middle of the back. The rhinophores are transversely ribbed. They are translucent white with small white spots and white tips. The oral tentacles are short and slender, translucent white with white spots. The cerata are moderately long and fusiform in shape. There is a band of white spots halfway up each ceras and a distinct lemon yellow ring towards the tip.
