= Rainbow nudibranch =

Rainbow nudibranch may refer to two species of sea slug:

- Babakina anadoni, found in the Atlantic Ocean
- Dendronotus iris, found in on the west coast of North America
