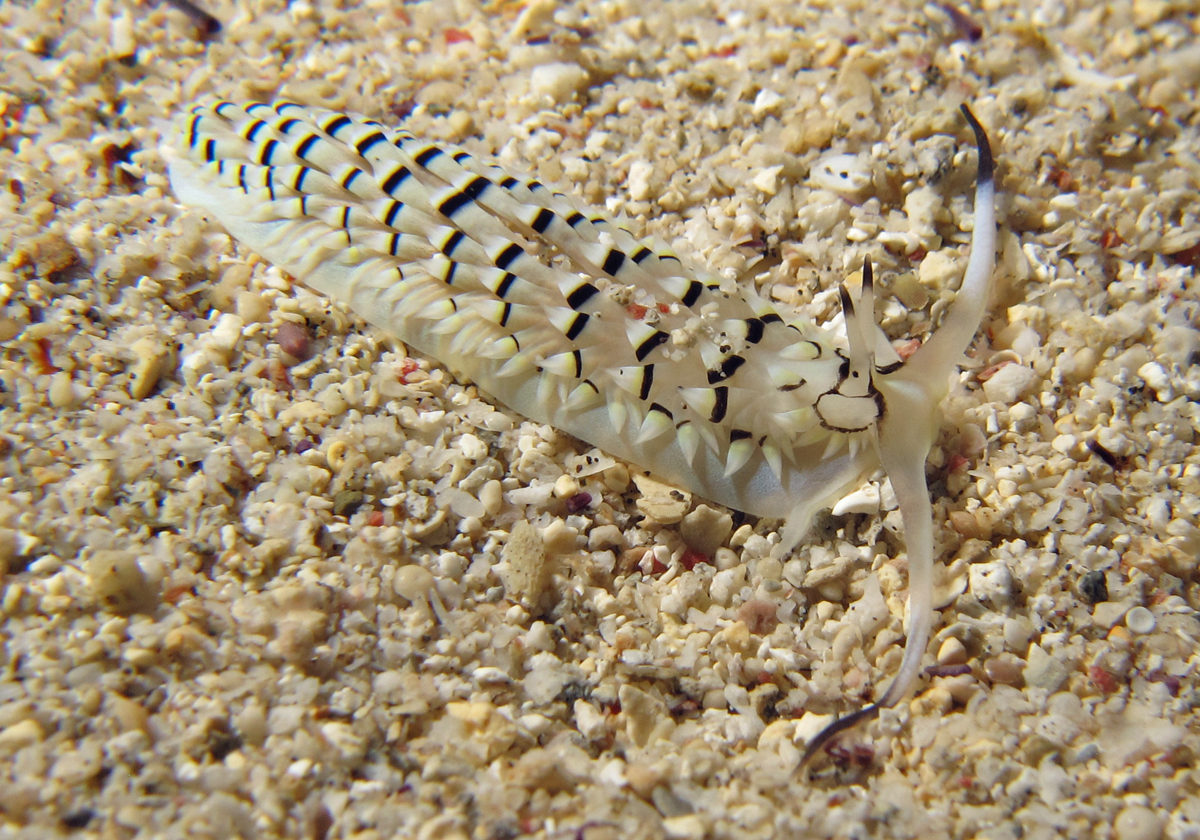

Scientific classification
- Kingdom: Animalia
- Phylum: Mollusca
- Class: Gastropoda
- Order: Nudibranchia
- Suborder: Aeolidacea
- Family: Aeolidiidae
- Genus: Cerberilla
- Species: C. annulata

Binomial name
- Cerberilla annulata (Quoy & Gaimard, 1832)

Synonyms
- Eolidia annulata Quoy & Gaimard, 1832

= Cerberilla annulata =

Species of gastropod

Cerberilla annulata is a species of sea slug, an aeolid nudibranch, a marine heterobranch mollusc in the family Aeolidiidae.

== Distribution ==
This species was described from New Caledonia. It has been reported from localities in the Indo-West Pacific region from Tanzania, Tahiti and New Caledonia and is probably widespread in the Indo-West Pacific.

== Description ==
All Cerberilla species have a broad foot and the cerata are long and numerous, arranged in transverse rows across the body. In this species the long oral tentacles have diffuse bands of light and dark blue and there is a narrow band of black and a band of yellow on each of the white cerata. Some specimens have white pigment on the oral tentacles and broad black bands on the cerata and this name may represent a species complex.

== Ecology ==
Species of Cerberilla live on and in sandy substrates where they burrow beneath the surface and feed on burrowing sea anemones.
