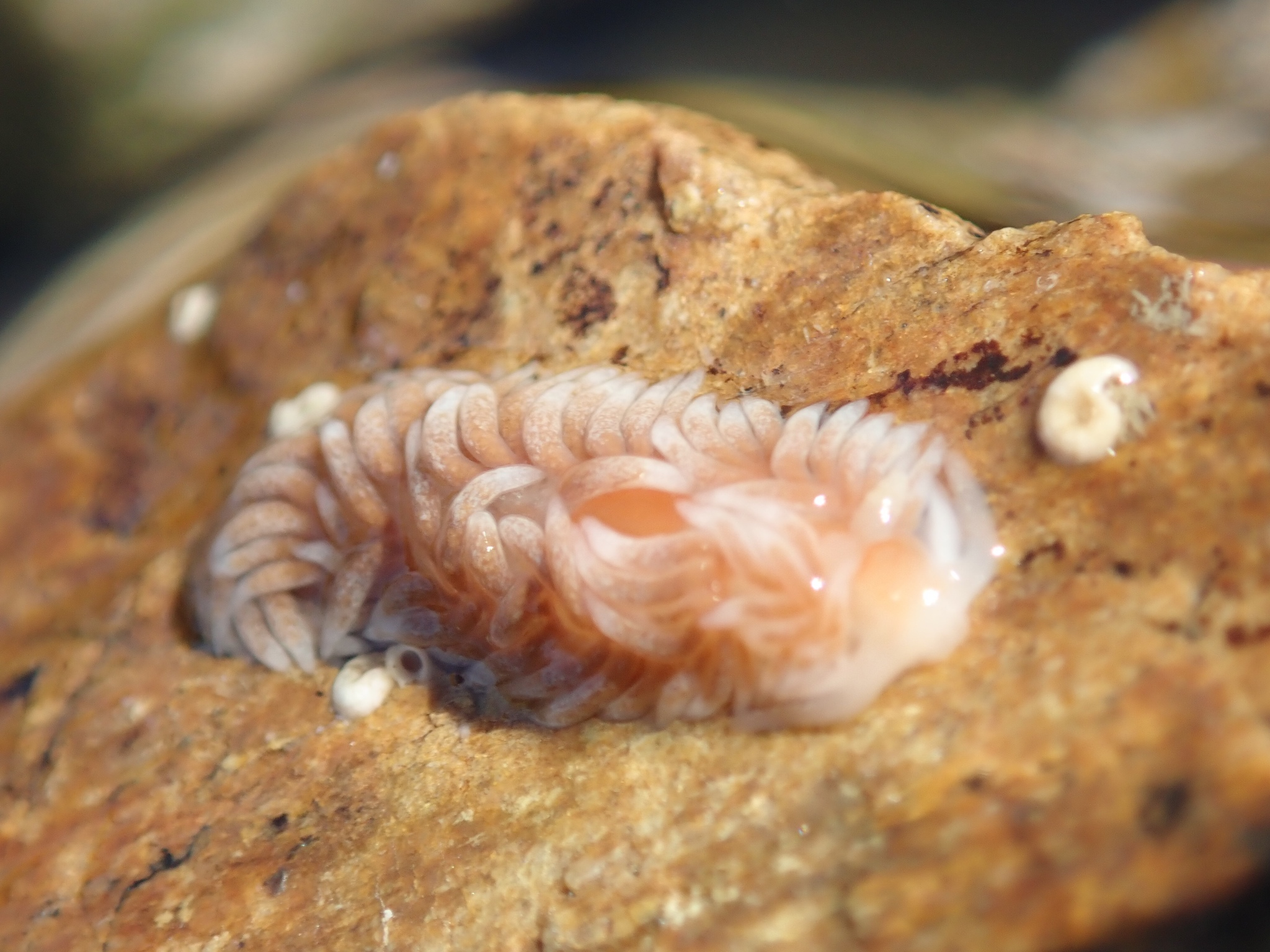

Scientific classification
- Kingdom: Animalia
- Phylum: Mollusca
- Class: Gastropoda
- Order: Nudibranchia
- Suborder: Aeolidacea
- Family: Aeolidiidae
- Genus: Novaeolidiella
- Species: N. drusilla

Binomial name
- Novaeolidiella drusilla Bergh, 1900

= Novaeolidiella drusilla =

Species of gastropod

Novaeolidiella drusilla is a species of sea slug, an aeolid nudibranch in the family Aeolidiidae.

== Description ==
The body attains a length of 60 mm.

== Distribution ==
This marine species was described from Cook Strait, New Zealand. It is also found in southern Australia.
