= Cerberilla longibranchus =

Scientific classification
- Kingdom: Animalia
- Phylum: Mollusca
- Class: Gastropoda
- Order: Nudibranchia
- Suborder: Aeolidacea
- Family: Aeolidiidae
- Genus: Cerberilla
- Species: C. longibranchus

Binomial name
- Cerberilla longibranchus (Volodchenko, 1941)

Species of gastropod

Cerberilla longibranchus is a species of sea slug, an aeolid nudibranch, a marine heterobranch mollusc in the family Aeolidiidae.

== Distribution ==
This species was described from the Russian Pacific Ocean. It has also been reported from Japan.

== Description ==
All Cerberilla species have a broad foot and the cerata are long and numerous, arranged in transverse rows across the body. This species is predominantly brown and the cerata are brown becoming almost black at the tips.

== Ecology ==
Species of Cerberilla live on and in sandy substrates where they burrow beneath the surface and feed on burrowing sea anemones.
