= Cerberilla potiguara =

Scientific classification
- Kingdom: Animalia
- Phylum: Mollusca
- Class: Gastropoda
- Order: Nudibranchia
- Suborder: Aeolidacea
- Family: Aeolidiidae
- Genus: Cerberilla
- Species: C. potiguara

Binomial name
- Cerberilla potiguara Padula & Delgado, 2010

Species of gastropod

Cerberilla potiguara is a species of sea slug, an aeolid nudibranch, a marine heterobranch mollusc in the family Aeolidiidae.

== Distribution ==
This species was described from northeastern Brazil.

== Description ==
All Cerberilla species have a broad foot and the cerata are long and numerous, arranged in transverse rows across the body. In this species the long oral tentacles are entirely dark blue and there is a band of yellow and one of orange across the front of the head. The outermost cerata are dark grey with bright orange tips and those towards the middle of the back are translucent with yellow tips.

== Ecology ==
Species of Cerberilla live on and in sandy substrates where they burrow beneath the surface and feed on burrowing sea anemones.
