= Cerberilla longicirrha =

Scientific classification
- Kingdom: Animalia
- Phylum: Mollusca
- Class: Gastropoda
- Order: Nudibranchia
- Suborder: Aeolidacea
- Family: Aeolidiidae
- Genus: Cerberilla
- Species: C. longicirrha

Binomial name
- Cerberilla longicirrha Bergh, 1873

Species of gastropod

Cerberilla longicirrha is a species of sea slug, an aeolid nudibranch, a marine heterobranch mollusc in the family Aeolidiidae. It is the type species of the genus Cerberilla.

== Distribution ==
This species was described from the Indo-Pacific region.

== Description ==
All Cerberilla species have a broad foot and the cerata are numerous, arranged in transverse rows across the body.

== Ecology ==
Species of Cerberilla live on and in sandy substrates where they burrow beneath the surface and feed on burrowing sea anemones.
