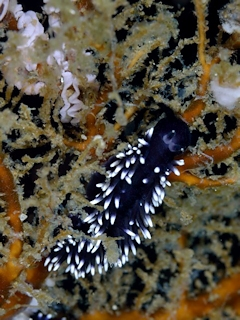

Scientific classification
- Kingdom: Animalia
- Phylum: Mollusca
- Class: Gastropoda
- Order: Nudibranchia
- Suborder: Aeolidacea
- Family: Pleurolidiidae
- Genus: Protaeolidiella; Baba, 1955
- Species: P. atra

Binomial name
- Protaeolidiella atra Baba, 1955

= Protaeolidiella =

Species of gastropod

Protaeolidiella atra is a species of sea slug, an aeolid nudibranch, a marine gastropod mollusc in the family Pleurolidiidae. It is the only species in the genus Protaeolidiella.

== Taxonomic history ==
This species was synonymised with Pleurolidia juliae by Rudman. A careful study by Carmona et al. using DNA sequencing showed that these were really two sister species and that they were not members of the family Aeolidiidae.

== Distribution ==
This species was described from Kasajima, Sagami Bay, Japan. It is also known from Korea.

== Description ==
Protaeolidiella atra is an aeolid nudibranch with a burgundy to black coloured body and numerous cerata with white tips. It is confused with Pleurolidia juliae in many works but can be distinguished by the lack of a dorsal white line on the body and more numerous, ungrouped cerata.
