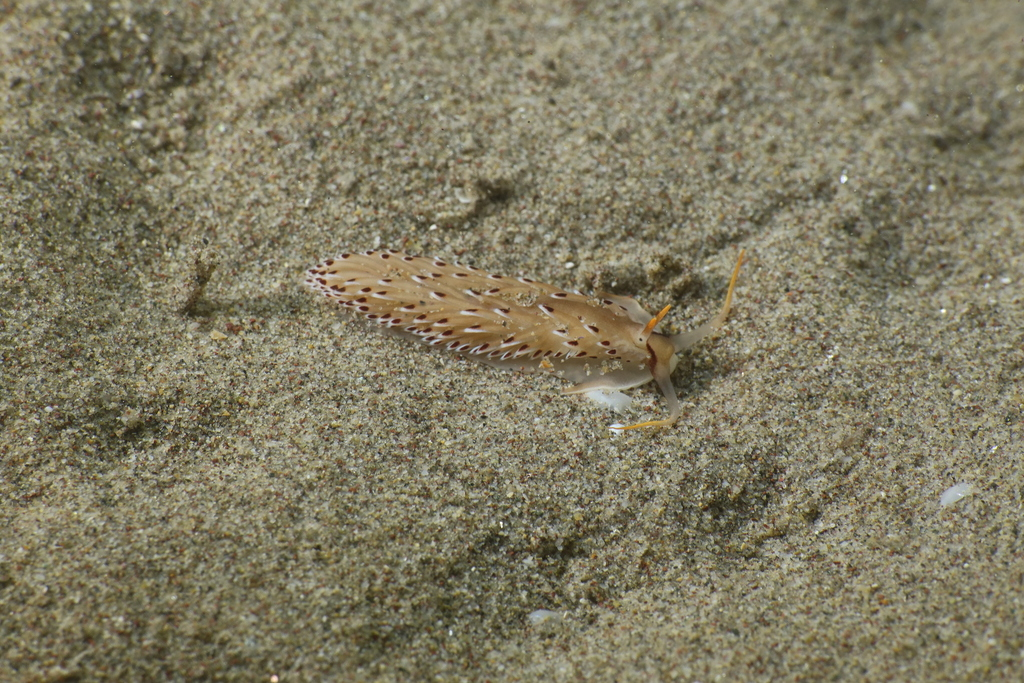

Scientific classification
- Kingdom: Animalia
- Phylum: Mollusca
- Class: Gastropoda
- Order: Nudibranchia
- Suborder: Aeolidacea
- Family: Aeolidiidae
- Genus: Cerberilla
- Species: C. bernadettae

Binomial name
- Cerberilla bernadettae Tardy, 1965

Synonyms
- Cerberilla bernadetti Tardy, 1965 (incorrectly formed specific epithet (feminine genitive))

= Cerberilla bernadettae =

Species of gastropod

Cerberilla bernadettae is a species of sea slug, an aeolid nudibranch, a marine heterobranch mollusc in the family Aeolidiidae.

== Distribution ==
This species was described from la pointe de la Fumée, Île-d'Aix, Charente-Maritime on the Atlantic coast of France. It has been reported from Italy and Tunisia.

== Description ==
All Cerberilla species have a broad foot and the cerata are numerous, arranged in transverse rows across the body. In this species the body and cerata are mostly translucent white. There are dark brown lines forming an inverted V on the front of the head. The cerata have a black mark on the upper surface just below the opaque white tip. The long oral tentacles have a white band on the upper surface and yellow-orange tips. The small rhinophores are yellow-orange.

== Ecology ==
Species of Cerberilla live on and in sandy substrates where they burrow beneath the surface and feed on burrowing sea anemones.
