= Berghia dakariensis =

Scientific classification
- Kingdom: Animalia
- Phylum: Mollusca
- Class: Gastropoda
- Order: Nudibranchia
- Suborder: Aeolidacea
- Family: Aeolidiidae
- Genus: Berghia
- Species: B. dakariensis

Binomial name
- Berghia dakariensis (Pruvot-Fol, 1953)

Synonyms
- Spurilla dakariensis Pruvot-Fol 1953; Aeolidiella benteva (Er. Marcus, 1958); Anteaeolidiella benteva (Er. Marcus, 1958); Baeolidia benteva Er. Marcus, 1958

Species of gastropod

Berghia dakariensis is a species of sea slug, an aeolid nudibranch. It is a shell-less marine gastropod mollusc in the family Aeolidiidae.

== Distribution ==
This species was described from Senegal, West Africa. Baeolidia benteva was described from the Caribbean Sea and is currently considered to be a synonym of this species. Carmona et al. considered S. dakariensis to be a nomen dubium since “some forms of Spurilla neapolitana, Spurilla sp. A and Spurilla braziliana could be attributed to Spurilla dakariensis. Additionally, it has been shown that the radular morphology of aeolidiids does not allow unequivocal identification of species."

== Description ==
The maximum recorded body length is 19 mm.

== Habitat ==
Minimum recorded depth is 0 m. Maximum recorded depth is 0 m.
