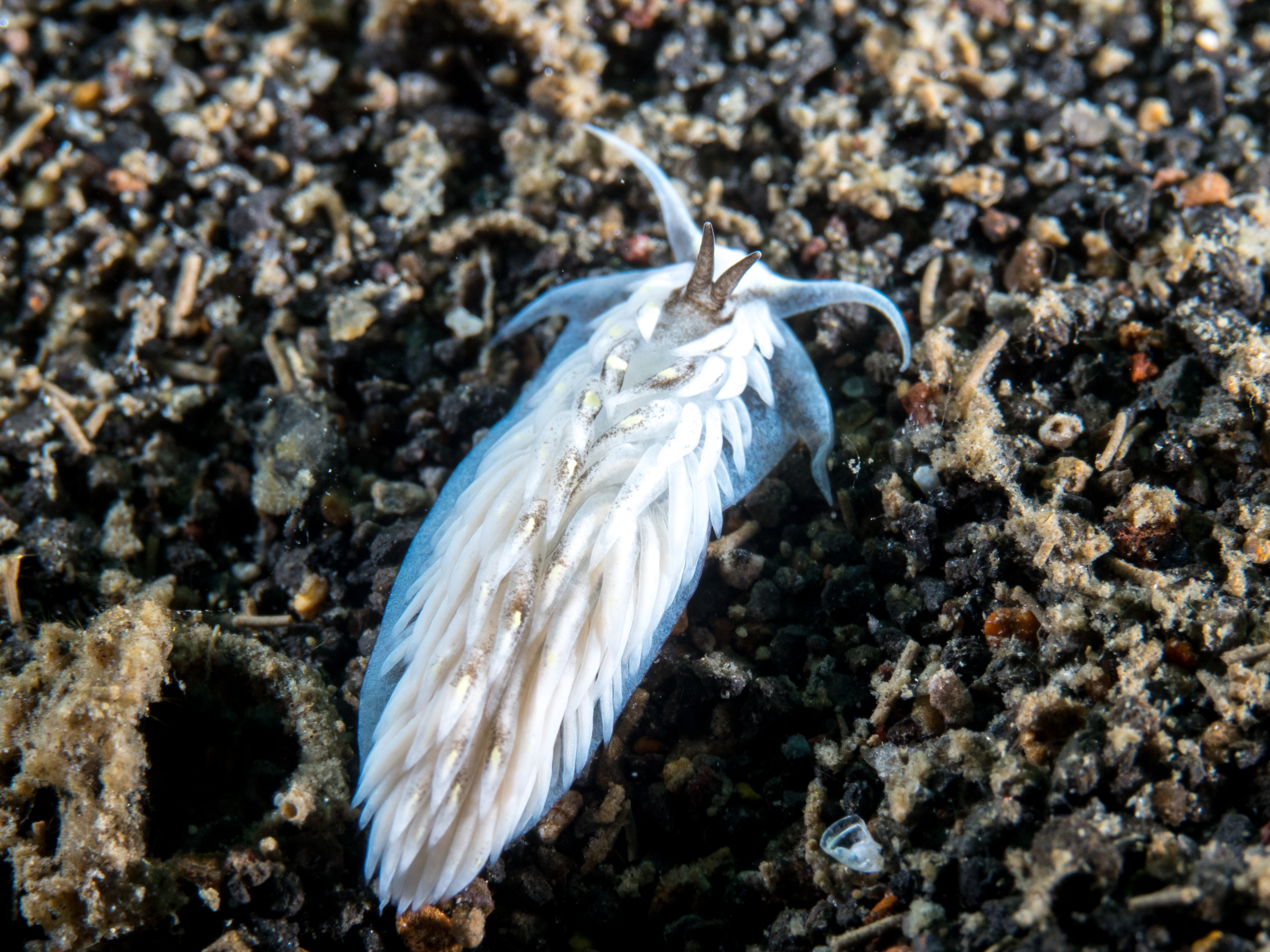
- Cerberilla asamusiensis

Scientific classification
- Kingdom: Animalia
- Phylum: Mollusca
- Class: Gastropoda
- Order: Nudibranchia
- Suborder: Aeolidacea
- Family: Aeolidiidae
- Genus: Cerberilla
- Species: C. asamusiensis

Binomial name
- Cerberilla asamusiensis Baba, 1940

= Cerberilla asamusiensis =

Species of gastropod

Cerberilla asamusiensis is a species of sea slug, an aeolid nudibranch, a marine heterobranch mollusc in the family Aeolidiidae.

== Distribution ==
This species was described from Asamushi, Mutsu Bay, Japan. It was redescribed in more detail on the basis of more specimens from Sagami Bay and Tomioka, Amakusa District, Kumamoto. A very similar looking animal has been reported from Moreton Island, Queensland, Australia.

== Description ==
All Cerberilla species have a broad foot and the cerata are long and numerous, arranged in transverse rows across the body. In this species the back of the body and cerata bases are covered with diffuse brown pigment and the foot is translucent white. The long oral tentacles have black frontal edges and outer section and there is a curved black spot beneath a white tip on each of the cerata.

== Ecology ==
Species of Cerberilla live on and in sandy substrates where they burrow beneath the surface and feed on burrowing sea anemones.
