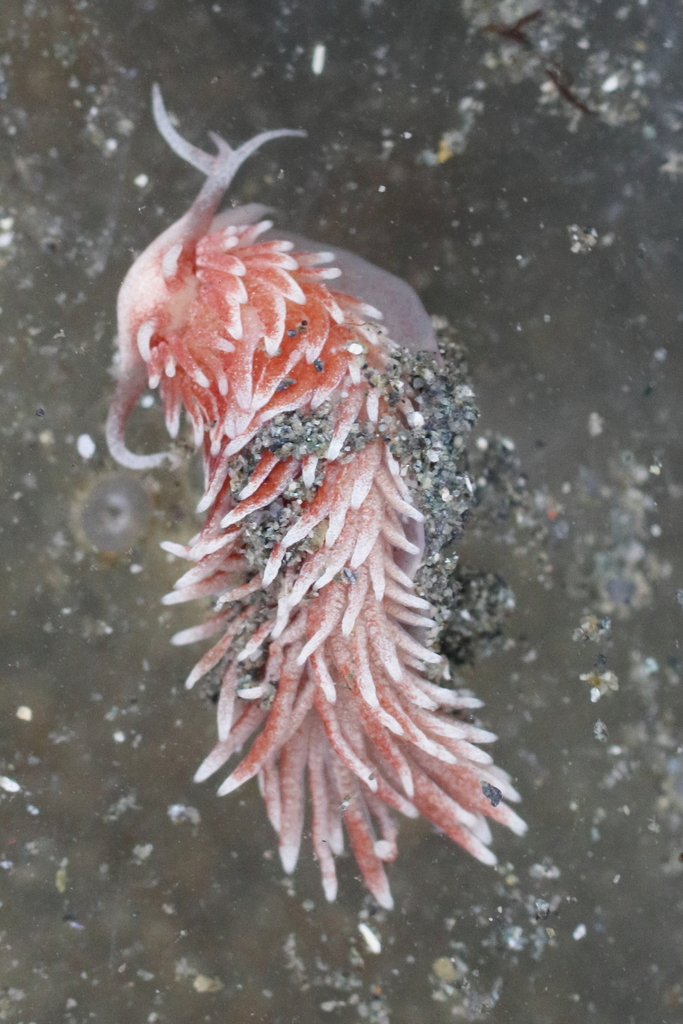

Scientific classification
- Kingdom: Animalia
- Phylum: Mollusca
- Class: Gastropoda
- Order: Nudibranchia
- Suborder: Aeolidacea
- Family: Aeolidiidae
- Genus: Cerberilla
- Species: C. mosslandica

Binomial name
- Cerberilla mosslandica McDonald & Nybakken, 1975

= Cerberilla mosslandica =

Species of gastropod

Cerberilla mosslandica is a species of sea slug, an aeolid nudibranch, and a marine heterobranch mollusc in the family Aeolidiidae.

== Distribution ==
This species was described from Monterey Bay, California. It has also been reported near Duncan, Vancouver Island, British Columbia, Canada. A specimen from St. Peter the Great Bay, Russia, exhibited more white pigment and lines on the cerata, suggesting it may be a different species.

== Description ==
All Cerberilla species have a broad foot, and the cerata are numerous, arranged in transverse rows across the body. In this species, the body is mostly translucent white with a pinkish hue on the head. The digestive gland is darker pink. The tips of the rhinophores and cerata are covered with opaque white pigment, and there are white pigment spots on the outer part of the oral tentacles. This species has short oral tentacles and large rhinophores compared to other Cerberilla species and may belong to the genus Aeolidiella.

== Ecology ==
Species of Cerberilla live on and in sandy substrates, where they burrow beneath the surface and feed on burrowing sea anemones.
