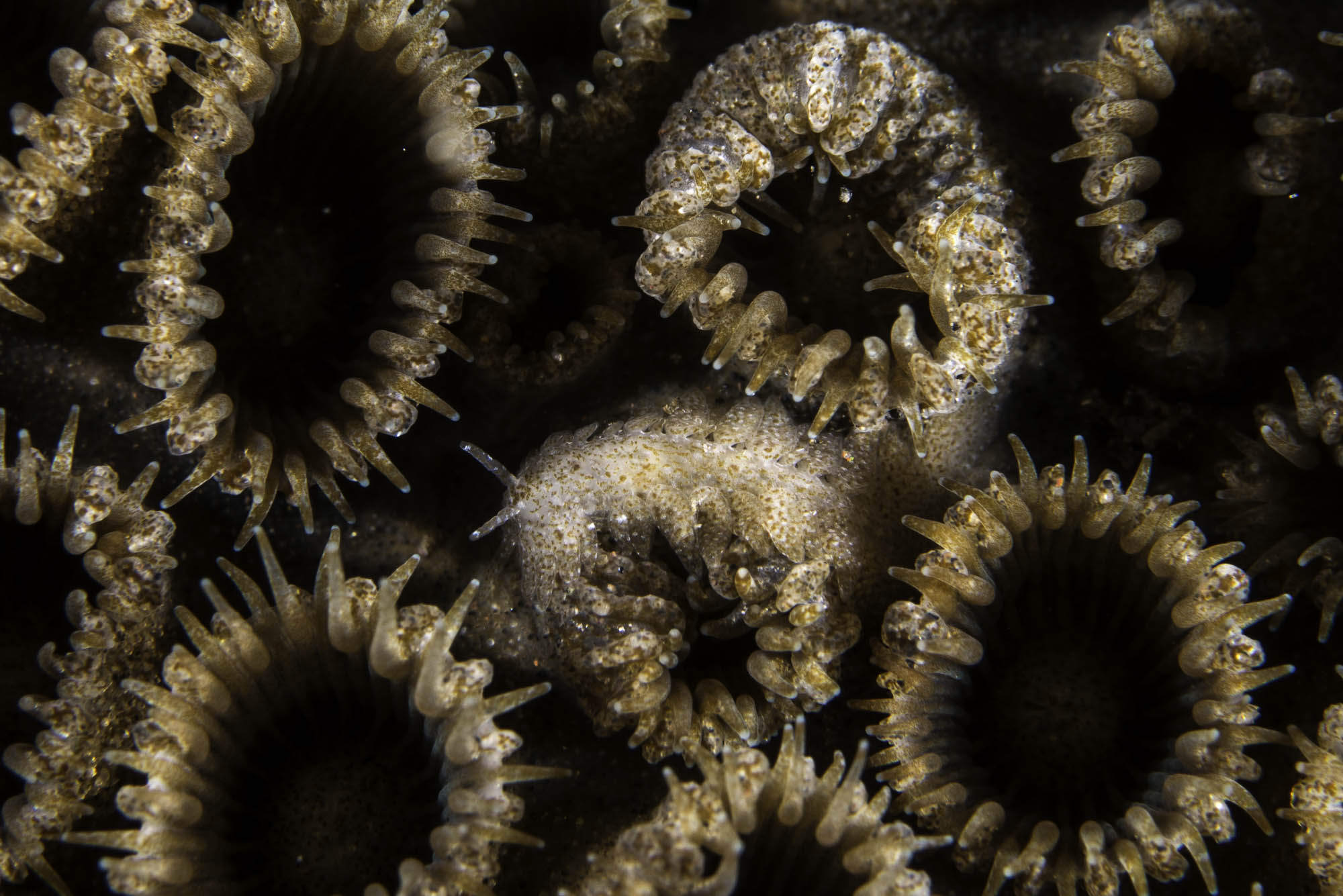
- Aeolidiopsis ransoni amongst its food, Palythoa sp.

Scientific classification
- Kingdom: Animalia
- Phylum: Mollusca
- Class: Gastropoda
- Order: Nudibranchia
- Suborder: Aeolidacea
- Family: Aeolidiidae
- Genus: Aeolidiopsis
- Species: A. ransoni

Binomial name
- Aeolidiopsis ransoni (Pruvot-Fol, 1956

Synonyms
- Baeolidia ransoni (Pruvot-Fol, 1956)

= Aeolidiopsis ransoni =

Species of gastropod

Aeolidiopsis ransoni is a species of sea slug, an aeolid nudibranch. It is a marine gastropod mollusc in the family Aeolidiidae.

== Distribution ==
The holotype of this species was collected in Koukura Is, Tuamotu Archipelago, in the central Pacific Ocean. It has been reported from Japan, Indonesia and Australia.

== Description ==
The body of Aeolidiopsis ransoni is translucent white. The cerata are overlaid with brown spots, which are groups of zooxanthellae.

== Ecology ==
Aeolidiopsis ransoni feeds on colonial sea anemones of the genus Palythoa.
