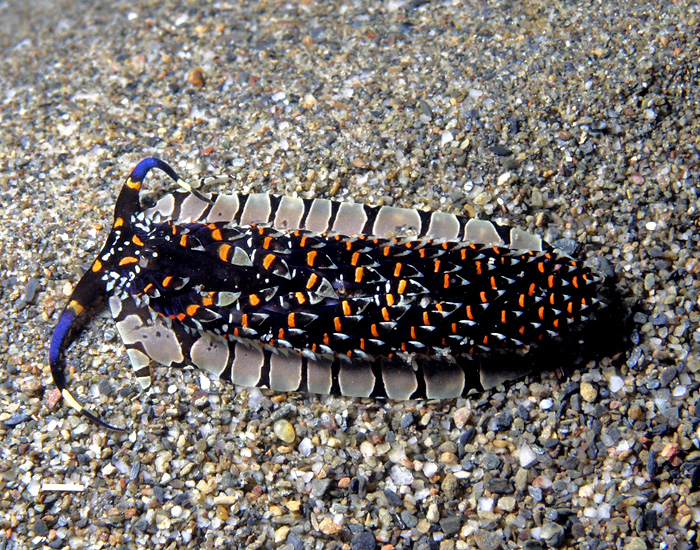
- The nudibranch Cerberilla ambonensis, East Timor

Scientific classification
- Kingdom: Animalia
- Phylum: Mollusca
- Class: Gastropoda
- Order: Nudibranchia
- Suborder: Aeolidacea
- Family: Aeolidiidae
- Genus: Cerberilla
- Species: C. ambonensis

Binomial name
- Cerberilla ambonensis Bergh, 1905

= Cerberilla ambonensis =

Species of gastropod

Cerberilla ambonensis is a species of sea slug, an aeolid nudibranch, a marine heterobranch mollusc in the family Aeolidiidae.

== Distribution ==
This species was described from Ambon Island, Indonesia.

== Description ==
All Cerberilla species have a broad foot and the cerata are numerous, arranged in transverse rows across the body. In this species the edge of the foot has distinctive black or dark brown stripes at right angles to the margin. The cerata are brown with a yellow or orange band on the dorsal surface and the foot is translucent white. The long oral tentacles have a pale yellow band near the translucent base, then a bright blue band which changes to black and then to pale yellow and finally to a black tip. This is slightly different to Bergh's illustration which shows dark grey oral tentacles with yellow tips.

== Ecology ==
Species of Cerberilla live on and in sandy substrates where they burrow beneath the surface and feed on burrowing sea anemones.
