= Cerberilla incola =

Scientific classification
- Kingdom: Animalia
- Phylum: Mollusca
- Class: Gastropoda
- Order: Nudibranchia
- Suborder: Aeolidacea
- Family: Aeolidiidae
- Genus: Cerberilla
- Species: C. incola

Binomial name
- Cerberilla incola Burn, 1974

Species of gastropod

Cerberilla incola is a species of sea slug, an aeolid nudibranch, a marine heterobranch mollusc in the family Aeolidiidae.

== Distribution ==
This species was described from Port Philip Bay, Victoria, Australia. It also occurs off New South Wales and Tasmania. It has also been reported from Reunion in the Indian Ocean.

== Description ==
All Cerberilla species have a broad foot and the cerata are long and numerous, arranged in transverse rows across the body. In this species the cerata have two longitudinal brown lines running along them. It has short oral tentacles and long rhinophores for a Cerberilla and is more like an Aeolidiella in overall appearance.
