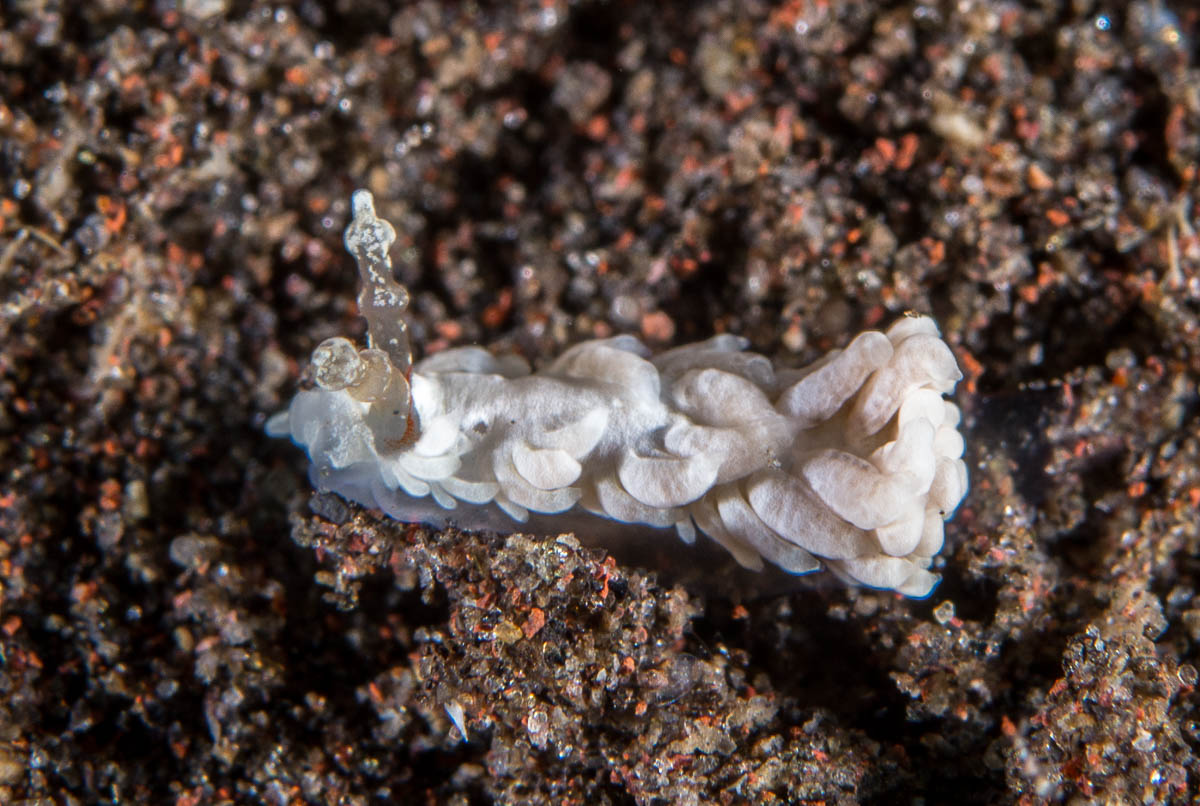
- The nudibranch Bulbaeolidia alba, Segara, Tulamben, Bali.

Scientific classification
- Kingdom: Animalia
- Phylum: Mollusca
- Class: Gastropoda
- Order: Nudibranchia
- Suborder: Aeolidacea
- Family: Aeolidiidae
- Genus: Bulbaeolidia
- Species: B. alba

Binomial name
- Bulbaeolidia alba (Risbec, 1928)

Synonyms
- Aeolidiella alba Risbec, 1928; Spurilla alba (Risbec, 1928)

= Bulbaeolidia alba =

Species of gastropod

Bulbaeolidia alba is a species of sea slug, an aeolid nudibranch, a marine gastropod mollusc in the family Aeolidiidae.

== Distribution ==
This species was described from New Caledonia. It has been reported from localities in the Central Indo-Pacific region to Réunion and Tanzania in the Indian Ocean.
