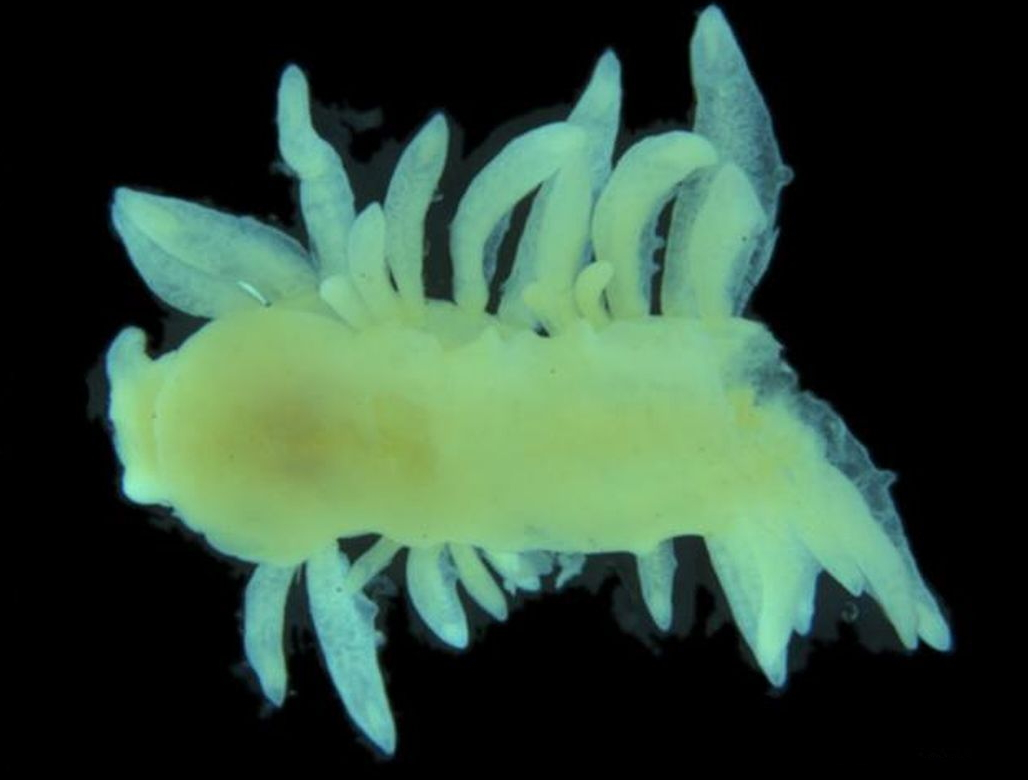
- Aeolidiopsis harrietae (specimen at the Australian Museum)

Scientific classification
- Kingdom: Animalia
- Phylum: Mollusca
- Class: Gastropoda
- Order: Nudibranchia
- Suborder: Aeolidacea
- Family: Aeolidiidae
- Genus: Aeolidiopsis
- Species: A. harrietae

Binomial name
- Aeolidiopsis harrietae Rudman, 1982

Synonyms
- Baeolidia harrietae (Rudman, 1982)

= Aeolidiopsis harrietae =

Species of gastropod

Aeolidiopsis harrietae is a species of sea slug, an aeolid nudibranch. It is a marine gastropod mollusc in the family Aeolidiidae.

== Distribution ==
This species was described from the Great Barrier Reef, Australia. It has been reported from Papua New Guinea, the Philippines and the Ryukyu Islands, Japan.

== Description ==
Aeolidiopsis harrietae is an extremely flattened animal which hides on the surface of the colonial zoantharian Palythoa.
