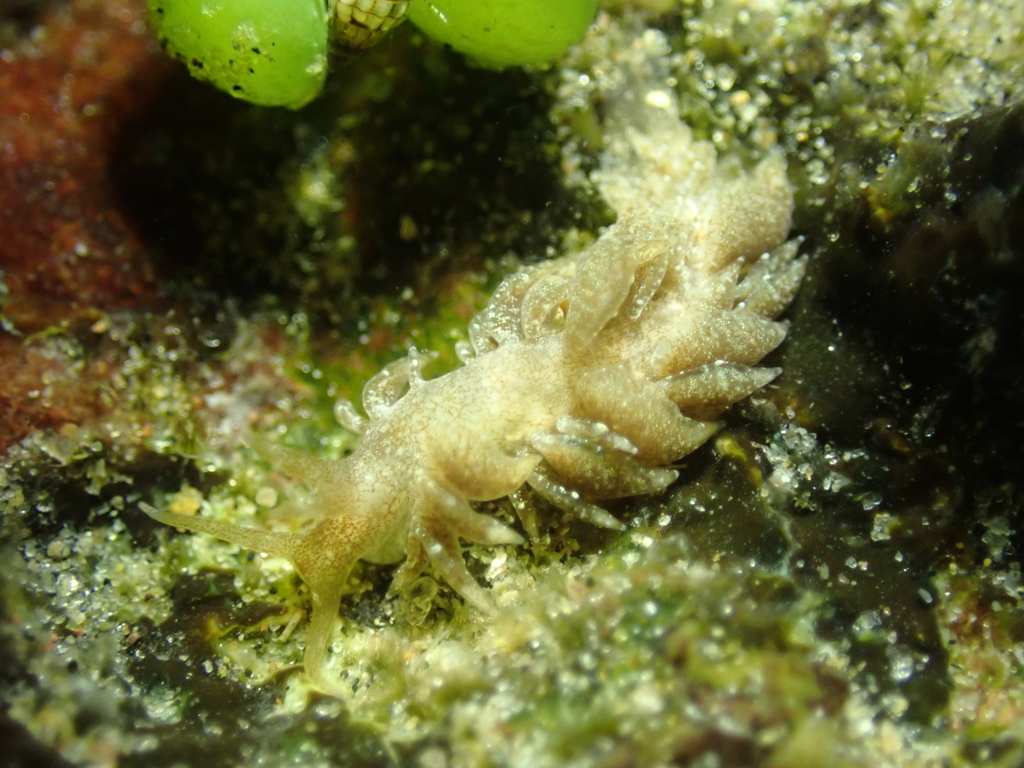

Scientific classification
- Kingdom: Animalia
- Phylum: Mollusca
- Class: Gastropoda
- Order: Nudibranchia
- Suborder: Aeolidacea
- Family: Aeolidiidae
- Genus: Aeolidiopsis
- Species: A. palythoae

Binomial name
- Aeolidiopsis palythoae Gosliner, 1985

= Aeolidiopsis palythoae =

Species of gastropod

Aeolidiopsis palythoae is a species of sea slug, an aeolid nudibranch. It is a marine gastropod mollusc in the family Aeolidiidae found in South Africa.

== Distribution ==
The holotype of this species was collected in the intertidal zone at Umgazana, south of Port St. Johns, Eastern Cape, South Africa. Additional specimens were collected at localities on the coast of South Africa from Umgazana to Jesser Point, Sodwana Bay National Park, Natal.

== Description ==
The body of Baeolidia palythoae is translucent yellowish. The yellow colour is overlaid with a reticulate brown pattern, which varies in density. The tip of each ceras bears a small opaque white spot. Ventrally and slightly eccentric to the apex is a larger spot of dark brown pigment. This pattern of colouration did not vary in any of the numerous specimens of this species observed.

== Ecology ==
Aeolidiopsis palythoae feeds on colonial sea anemones of the genus Palythoa.
