= Cerberilla pungoarena =

Scientific classification
- Kingdom: Animalia
- Phylum: Mollusca
- Class: Gastropoda
- Order: Nudibranchia
- Suborder: Aeolidacea
- Family: Aeolidiidae
- Genus: Cerberilla
- Species: C. pungoarena

Binomial name
- Cerberilla pungoarena Collier & Farmer, 1964

Species of gastropod

Cerberilla pungoarena is a species of sea slug, an aeolid nudibranch, a marine heterobranch mollusc in the family Aeolidiidae.

== Distribution ==
This species was described from Isla Ángel de la Guarda, Baja California. It has been reported from localities on the Pacific Ocean Coast of Mexico and California as far north as La Jolla and the Channel Islands.

== Description ==
All Cerberilla species have a broad foot and the cerata are long and numerous, arranged in transverse rows across the body. In this species the body is translucent with a light brown hue over the back and the surfaces of the cerata. The cerata have opaque white tips.

== Ecology ==
Species of Cerberilla live on and in sandy substrates where they burrow beneath the surface and feed on burrowing sea anemones.
