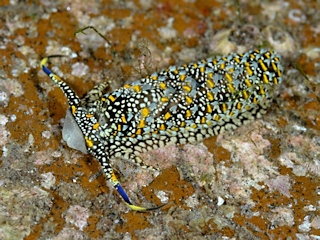

Scientific classification
- Kingdom: Animalia
- Phylum: Mollusca
- Class: Gastropoda
- Order: Nudibranchia
- Suborder: Aeolidacea
- Family: Aeolidiidae
- Genus: Cerberilla
- Species: C. albopunctata

Binomial name
- Cerberilla albopunctata Baba, 1976

= Cerberilla albopunctata =

Species of gastropod

Cerberilla albopunctata is a species of sea slug, an aeolid nudibranch, a marine heterobranch mollusc in the family Aeolidiidae.

== Distribution ==
This species was described from Tomioka, Amakusa District, Kumamoto and other localities in middle and southern Japan. A similar looking animal has been reported from Timor.

== Description ==
All Cerberilla species have a broad foot and the cerata are long and numerous, arranged in transverse rows across the body. In this spectacular species the body and cerata are covered with large round white spots on a translucent grey background. The long oral tentacles have white spotted bases and bands of bright blue and deep yellow and there is a band of yellow on each of the cerata.

== Ecology ==
Species of Cerberilla live on and in sandy substrates where they burrow beneath the surface and feed on burrowing sea anemones.
