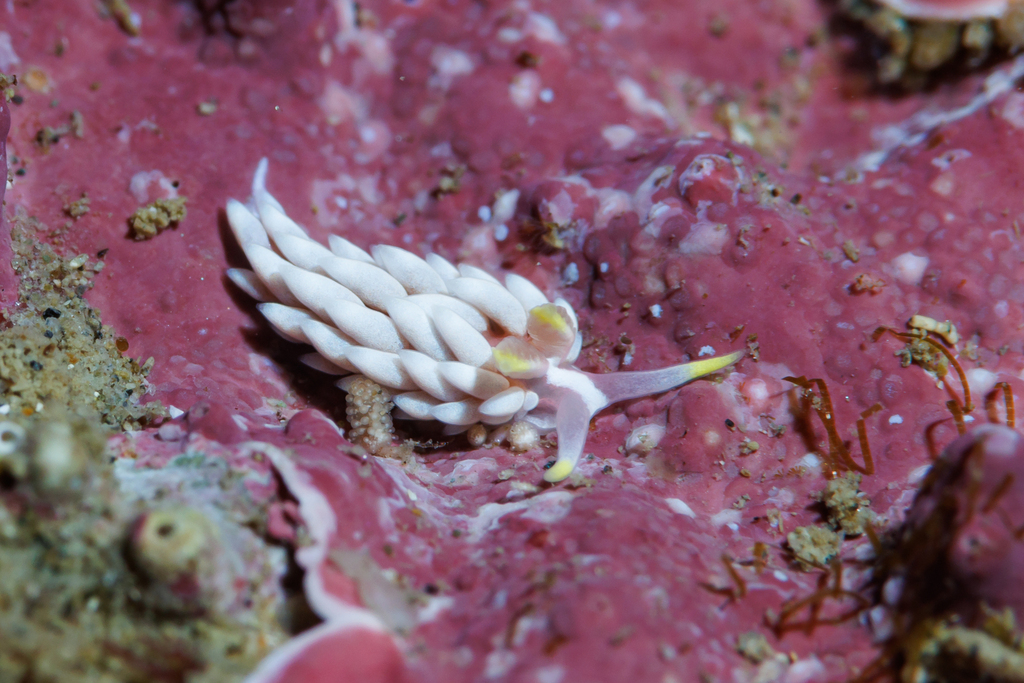
- Babakina caprinsulensis

Scientific classification
- Kingdom: Animalia
- Phylum: Mollusca
- Class: Gastropoda
- Order: Nudibranchia
- Suborder: Aeolidacea
- Family: Babakinidae
- Genus: Babakina
- Species: B. caprinsulensis

Binomial name
- Babakina caprinsulensis (Miller, 1974)

= Babakina caprinsulensis =

Species of gastropod

Babakina caprinsulensis is a species of sea slug, an aeolid nudibranch in the family Babakinidae, according to Gosliner T. M., Gonzáles-Duarte M. M. & Cervera J. L. (2007).

It is found in shallow water along part of the coast of North Island, New Zealand.
