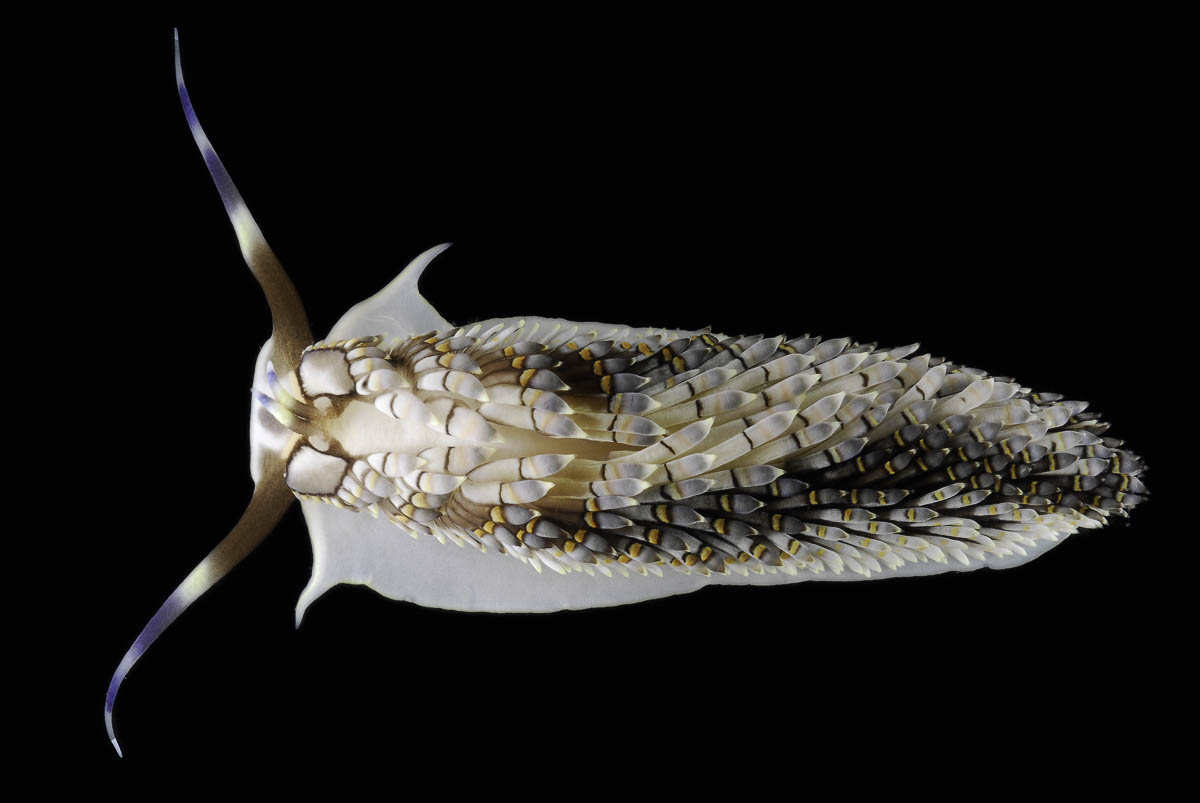
- The nudibranch Cerberilla africana, Likoni, Kenya.

Scientific classification
- Kingdom: Animalia
- Phylum: Mollusca
- Class: Gastropoda
- Order: Nudibranchia
- Suborder: Aeolidacea
- Family: Aeolidiidae
- Genus: Cerberilla; Bergh, 1873

Type species
- Cerberilla longicirrha Bergh, 1873

Synonyms
- Fenrisia Bergh, 1888

= Cerberilla =

Genus of gastropods

Cerberilla is a genus of sea slugs, aeolid nudibranchs, shell-less marine gastropod mollusks in the family Aeolidiidae.

All Cerberilla species have a broad foot and the cerata are numerous, arranged in transverse rows across the body. They live on and in sandy substrates where they burrow beneath the surface and feed on burrowing sea anemones.

The taxonomic status of this genus remains unrevised.

== Species ==
Species in the genus Cerberilla include:

- Cerberilla affinis Bergh, 1888
- Cerberilla africana Eliot, 1903
- Cerberilla albopunctata Baba, 1976
- Cerberilla ambonensis Bergh, 1905
- Cerberilla annulata (Quoy & Gaimard, 1832)
- Cerberilla asamusiensis Baba, 1940
- Cerberilla bernadettae Tardy, 1965
- Cerberilla chavezi Hermosillo & Valdés, 2007
- Cerberilla incola Burn, 1974
- Cerberilla longibranchus (Volodchenko, 1941)
- Cerberilla longicirrha Bergh, 1873 - Type species
- Cerberilla moebii (Bergh, 1888)
- Cerberilla mosslandica McDonald & Nybakken, 1975
- Cerberilla potiguara Padula & Delgado, 2010
- Cerberilla pungoarena Collier & Farmer, 1964
- Cerberilla tanna Ev. Marcus & Er. Marcus, 1960

Species brought into synonymy

- Cerberilla bernadetti Tardy, 1965: synonym of Cerberilla bernadettae Tardy, 1965
