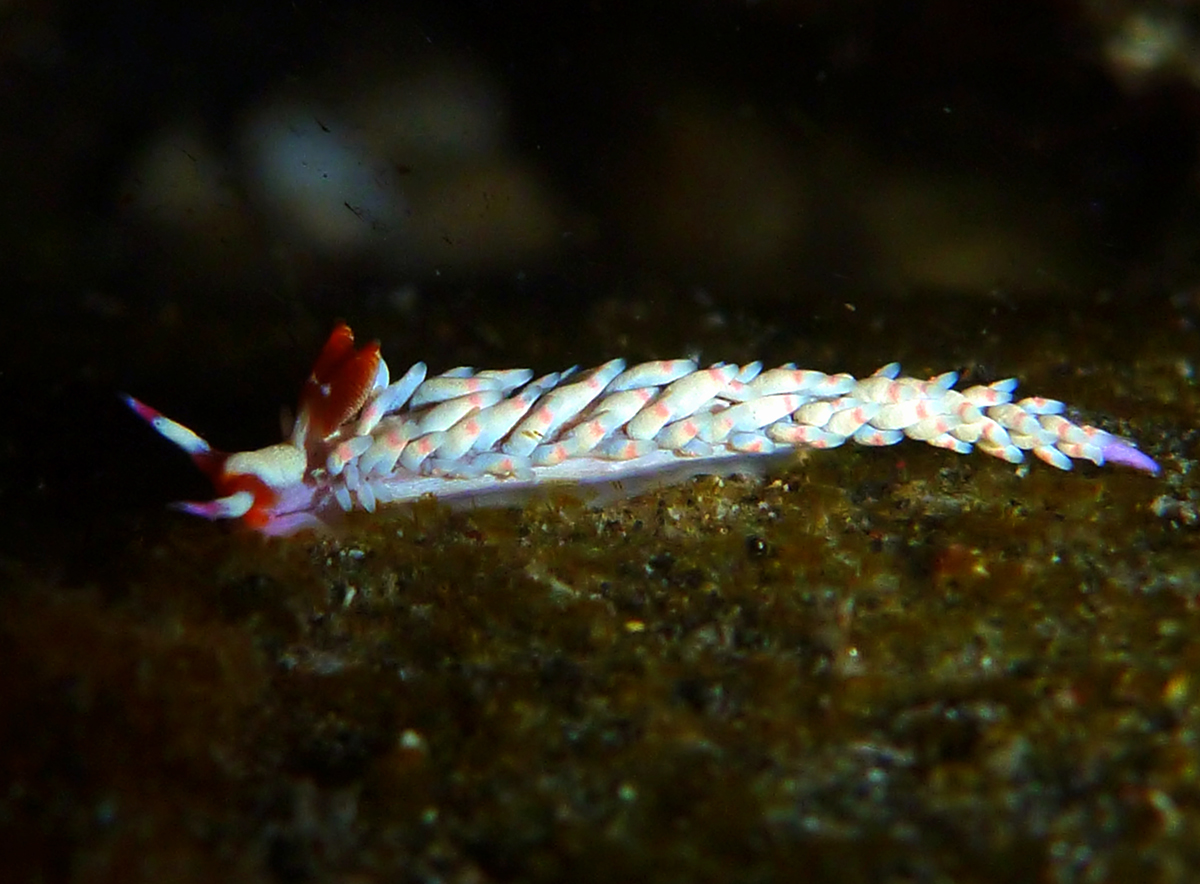
- Babakina indopacifica

Scientific classification
- Kingdom: Animalia
- Phylum: Mollusca
- Class: Gastropoda
- Order: Nudibranchia
- Suborder: Aeolidacea
- Superfamily: Aeolidioidea
- Family: Babakinidae; Roller, 1973
- Genus: Babakina; Roller, 1973

Type species
- Babaina festiva Roller, 1972

Diversity
- 4 species

Synonyms
- Babainidae Roller, 1972 (inv.); Babaina Roller, 1972 (invalid: junior homonym of Babaina Odhner, 1968; Babakina is a replacement name); Rioselleolis Ortea, 1979

= Babakina =

Genus of gastropods

Babakina is a genus of aeolid nudibranchs and the only member of the family Babakinidae. The genus is named after the Japanese malacologist Kikutaro Baba (1905-2001).

== Taxonomy ==
Babakina was placed in the subfamily Babakininae within the family Flabellinidae in the taxonomy of the Gastropoda by Bouchet & Rocroi, (2005). Babakina is the type genus of the subfamily Babakininae.

Gosliner et al. (2007) have elevated Babakinidae to the family level with the only genus Babakina.

== Species ==
There are four species within the genus Babakina:

- Babakina anadoni (Ortea, 1979)
- Babakina caprinsulensis (Miller, 1974)
- Babakina festiva (Roller, 1972) - type species
- Babakina indopacifica Gosliner, Gonzáles-Duarte & Cervera, 2007

In 2022, Babakina anadoni was found off the coast of the Isles of Scilly. Previously this rare 2 cm long species was only known from a handful of specimens found along the west coast of Spain and further south in the Atlantic.
