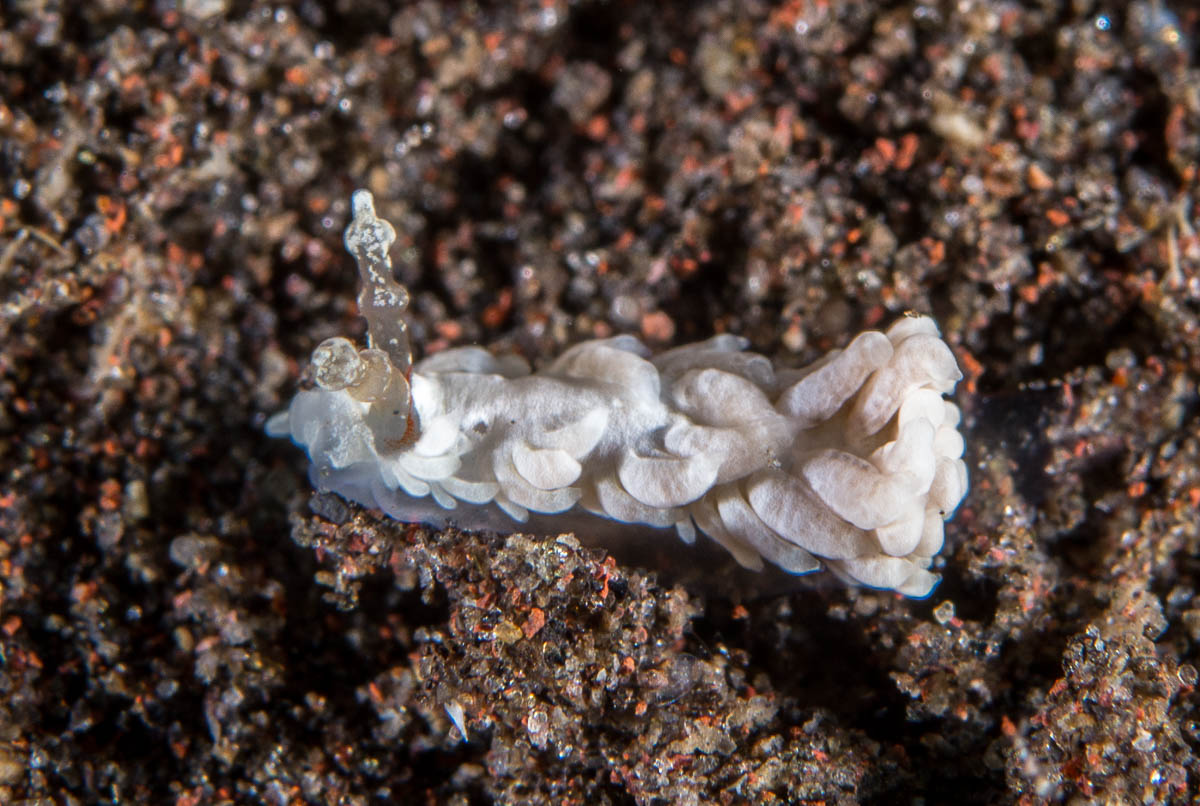
- Bulbaeolidia

Scientific classification
- Kingdom: Animalia
- Phylum: Mollusca
- Class: Gastropoda
- Order: Nudibranchia
- Suborder: Aeolidacea
- Family: Aeolidiidae
- Genus: Bulbaeolidia; Carmona, Pola, Gosliner & Cervera, 2013

Type species
- Bulbaeolidia alba (Risbec, 1928)

= Bulbaeolidia =

Genus of gastropods

Bulbaeolidia is a genus of marine nudibranch in the family Aeolidiidae.

== Species ==
Species in the genus Bulbaeolidia include:

- Bulbaeolidia alba (Risbec, 1928)
- Bulbaeolidia japonica (Eliot, 1913)
- Bulbaeolidia oasis Caballer & Ortea, 2015
- Bulbaeolidia sulphurea Caballer & Ortea, 2015
