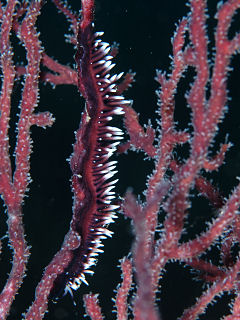
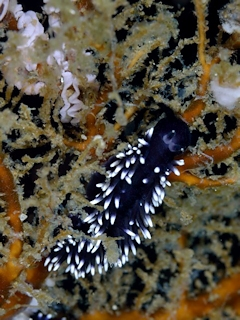
- From left to right: Pleurolidia juliae, and Protaeolidiella atra

Scientific classification
- Kingdom: Animalia
- Phylum: Mollusca
- Class: Gastropoda
- Order: Nudibranchia
- Suborder: Aeolidacea
- Superfamily: Aeolidioidea
- Family: Pleurolidiidae; Burn, 1966

Genera
- See Genera and species

= Pleurolidiidae =

Family of gastropods

Pleurolidiidae is a family of nudibranchs, shell-less marine gastropod molluscs or sea slugs, within the superfamily Aeolidioidea.

== Genera and species ==
According to Korshunova and colleagues (2025), the following genera and species are recognised in the family Pleurolidiidae:

- Pleurolidia Burn, 1966
  - Pleurolidia juliae Burn, 1966
- Protaeolidiella Baba, 1955
  - Protaeolidiella atra Baba, 1955

Pleurolidia juliae and Protaeolidiella atra are sister species according to DNA evidence and are poorly supported as members of the polyphyletic Facelinidae, being placed in their own family, Pleurolidiidae. A revision of the relationships of members of Aeolidacea, which includes Facelinidae, recovered similar results.
