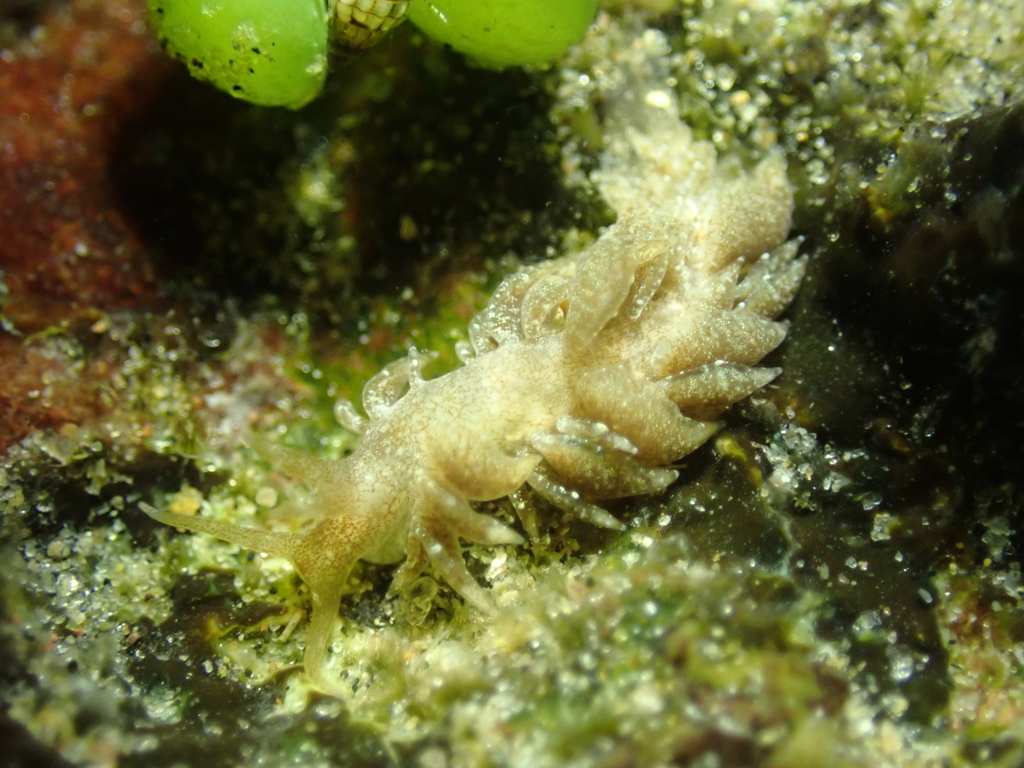
- Aeolidiopsis palythoae

Scientific classification
- Kingdom: Animalia
- Phylum: Mollusca
- Class: Gastropoda
- Order: Nudibranchia
- Suborder: Aeolidacea
- Family: Aeolidiidae
- Genus: Aeolidiopsis; Pruvot-Fol, 1956

Type species
- Aeolidiopsis ransoni Pruvot-Fol, 1956

= Aeolidiopsis =

Genus of gastropods

Aeolidiopsis is a genus of aeolid nudibranchs, marine gastropod molluscs in the family Aeolidiidae.

== Species ==
- Aeolidiopsis harrietae Rudman, 1982
- Aeolidiopsis palythoae (Gosliner, 1985)
- Aeolidiopsis ransoni Pruvot-Fol, 1956

Synonyms

- Aeolidiopsis elcanoi Ortea & Moro, 2020: synonym of Magallanes elcanoi (Ortea & Moro, 2020) (original combination)
