= Cerberilla chavezi =

Scientific classification
- Kingdom: Animalia
- Phylum: Mollusca
- Class: Gastropoda
- Order: Nudibranchia
- Suborder: Aeolidacea
- Family: Aeolidiidae
- Genus: Cerberilla
- Species: C. chavezi

Binomial name
- Cerberilla chavezi Hermosillo & Valdés, 2007

Species of gastropod

Cerberilla chavezi is a species of sea slug, an aeolid nudibranch, a marine heterobranch mollusc in the family Aeolidiidae.

== Distribution ==
This species was described from Bahía de Banderas and Manzanillo, Colima on the Pacific coast of Mexico.

== Description ==
All Cerberilla species have a broad foot and the cerata are long and numerous, arranged in transverse rows across the body. In this species the cerata are translucent pinkish with an opaque cream yellow dorsal line running about halfway along each ceras and a deep reddish brown patch just below the cream yellow tip.

== Ecology ==
Species of Cerberilla live on and in sandy substrates where they burrow beneath the surface and feed on burrowing sea anemones.
