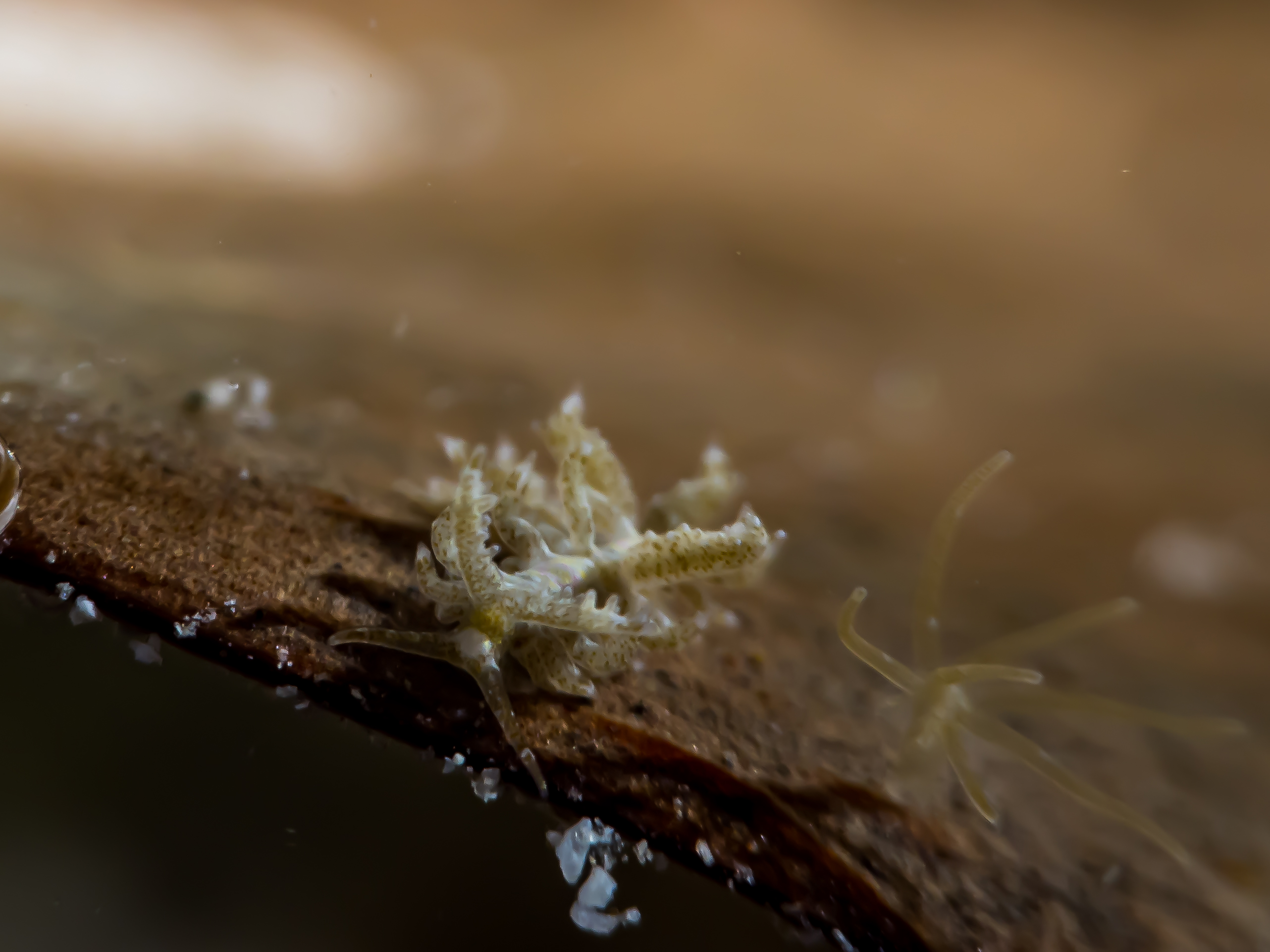
- Limenandra confusa, Philippines

Scientific classification
- Kingdom: Animalia
- Phylum: Mollusca
- Class: Gastropoda
- Order: Nudibranchia
- Suborder: Aeolidacea
- Family: Aeolidiidae
- Genus: Limenandra; Haefelfinger & Stamm, 1958

Type species
- Limenandra nodosa Haefelfinger & Stamm, 1958

= Limenandra =

Genus of gastropods

Limenandra is a genus of marine nudibranch in the family Aeolidiidae.

== Species ==
Species in the genus Limenandra include:

- Limenandra barnosii Carmona, Pola, Gosliner & Cervera, 2014
- Limenandra confusa Carmona, Pola, Gosliner & Cervera, 2014
- Limenandra fusiformis (Baba, 1949)
- Limenandra nodosa Haefelfinger & Stamm, 1958
- Limenandra rosanae Carmona, Pola, Gosliner & Cervera, 2014
