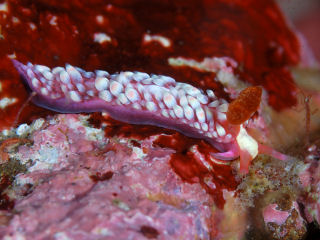

Scientific classification
- Kingdom: Animalia
- Phylum: Mollusca
- Class: Gastropoda
- Order: Nudibranchia
- Suborder: Aeolidacea
- Family: Babakinidae
- Genus: Babakina
- Species: B. festiva

Binomial name
- Babakina festiva (Roller, 1972)

Synonyms
- Babaina festiva Roller, 1972

= Babakina festiva =

Species of gastropod

Babakina festiva is a species of sea slug, an aeolid nudibranch in the family Babakinidae. It is mostly found off the coast of California.
