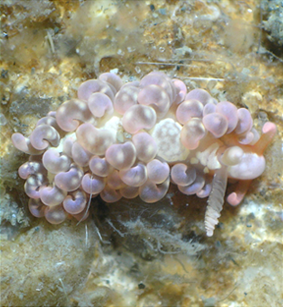
- dorsal view of Spurilla neapolitana heading right

Scientific classification
- Kingdom: Animalia
- Phylum: Mollusca
- Class: Gastropoda
- Order: Nudibranchia
- Suborder: Aeolidacea
- Family: Aeolidiidae
- Genus: Spurilla
- Species: S. neapolitana

Binomial name
- Spurilla neapolitana (Delle Chiaje, 1841)

Synonyms
- Eolis alderiana Deshayes, 1865; Eolis conspersa Fischer P., 1869; Eolis neapolitana Delle Chiaje, 1841; Flabellina inornata A. Costa, 1866; Spurilla mograbina Pruvot-Fol, 1953; Spurilla vayssierei Garcia-Gomez & Cervera, 1985

= Spurilla neapolitana =

Neapolitan spurilla

Species of gastropod

Spurilla neapolitana, the Neapolitan spurilla, is a species of sea slug, an aeolid nudibranch, a marine gastropod mollusk in the family Aeolidiidae. It is native to the western Atlantic Ocean, the Caribbean Sea and the Mediterranean Sea. This species was first described as Eolis neapolitana by the Italian naturalist Stefano delle Chiaje in 1841. However, although some authorities quote the year as 1823, the species does not appear in the first volume of delle Chiaje's memoirs, which was published that year. The species was later reassigned to the genus Spurilla.

== Distribution ==
Spurilla neapolitana is found in shallow temperate waters in the Mediterranean Sea, the western Atlantic Ocean, the Caribbean Sea, the Gulf of Mexico and Baja California. Molecular studies have shown that this is a species complex consisting of at least three species. The type Spurilla neapolitana is found in the eastern Atlantic Ocean, from Cape Verde and the Azores to Portugal, and in the Mediterranean Sea. The western Atlantic population was denoted as Spurilla braziliana by MacFarland (1909) and the Pacific specimens may also be S. braziliana.

== Description ==
Spurilla neapolitana is a large nudibranch, growing to a length of 70 mm (2.8 in) in the Mediterranean Sea. The rhinophores (the pair of sensory structures on the dorsal surface of the head) are lamellate. The cerata (outgrowths of the body) are also flattened and have opaque white tips. These tips are known as cnidosacs and are defensive structures armed with cnidocytes (stinging cells) garnered from sea anemones that the nudibranch has eaten. The general colour of this species is orange or pinkish, perhaps depending on what it has been eating, often with dark streaking where the tortuous digestive gland is visible through the translucent skin and the walls of the cerata. Some individuals have opaque patches of white on the body wall.

== Habitat ==
Minimum recorded depth is 0 m. Maximum recorded depth is 3 m.

== Feeding habits ==
Spurilla neapolitana feeds on sea anemones. The cnidocytes pass unharmed through the gut of the nudibranch to the tip of the cerata where they are stored, to be used in the animal's defence. The nudibranch's tissues harbour live intracellular zooxanthellae (photosynthetic single celled organisms), also derived from the sea anemone. It has been shown that the nudibranch's faeces contain live zooxanthellae, theoretically capable of reinfecting sea anemones, and this may be an important means by which the sea anemones acquire their zooxanthellae.
