= Novaeolidiella =

Scientific classification
- Kingdom: Animalia
- Phylum: Mollusca
- Class: Gastropoda
- Order: Nudibranchia
- Suborder: Aeolidacea
- Family: Aeolidiidae
- Genus: Novaeolidiella; Carmona, Martín-Hervás, Pola, Gosliner & Cervera, 2026

Type species
- Aeolidiella drusilla Bergh, 1900

Genus of gastropods

Novaeolidiella is a genus of sea slugs, aeolid nudibranchs, marine gastropod molluscs in the family Aeolidiidae.

== Species ==
Species within the genus Novaeolidiella include:

- Novaeolidiella drusilla (Bergh, 1900)
- Novaeolidiella janae Carmona, Martín-Hervás, Pola, Gosliner & Cervera, 2026
