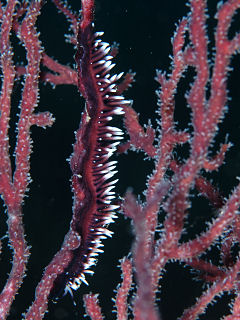

Scientific classification
- Kingdom: Animalia
- Phylum: Mollusca
- Class: Gastropoda
- Order: Nudibranchia
- Suborder: Aeolidacea
- Family: Pleurolidiidae
- Genus: Pleurolidia; Burn, 1966
- Species: P. juliae

Binomial name
- Pleurolidia juliae Burn, 1966

= Pleurolidia =

Species of gastropod

Pleurolidia juliae is a species of sea slug, an aeolid nudibranch, a marine gastropod mollusc in the family Pleurolidiidae. It is the only species in the genus Pleurolidia.

== Taxonomic history ==
This species was synonymised with Protaeolidiella atra by Rudman. A careful study by Carmona et al. using DNA sequencing showed that these were really two sister species and that they were not members of the family Aeolidiidae.

== Distribution ==
This species was described from Lord Howe Island, Australia. It has been reported from Madagascar, Papua New Guinea, Indonesia, the Philippines, Palau, Hawaii and Japan.

== Description ==
Pleurolidia juliae is an aeolid nudibranch with a black body and a dorsal white line. The body is slender and cylindrical with rounded foot corners. A broad, irregular white line runs along the dorsal midline. The oral tentacles are tipped with white. The rhinophores are greyish, with white specks over the warts, and have white tips. The cerata are in small groups which are not always symmetrical, sometimes having a zigzag arrangement. They extend from behind the rhinophores to the posterior end of the body. They are black with opaque white spots over their surface and translucent white tips. It is illustrated in many works under the name Protaeolidiella atra.
