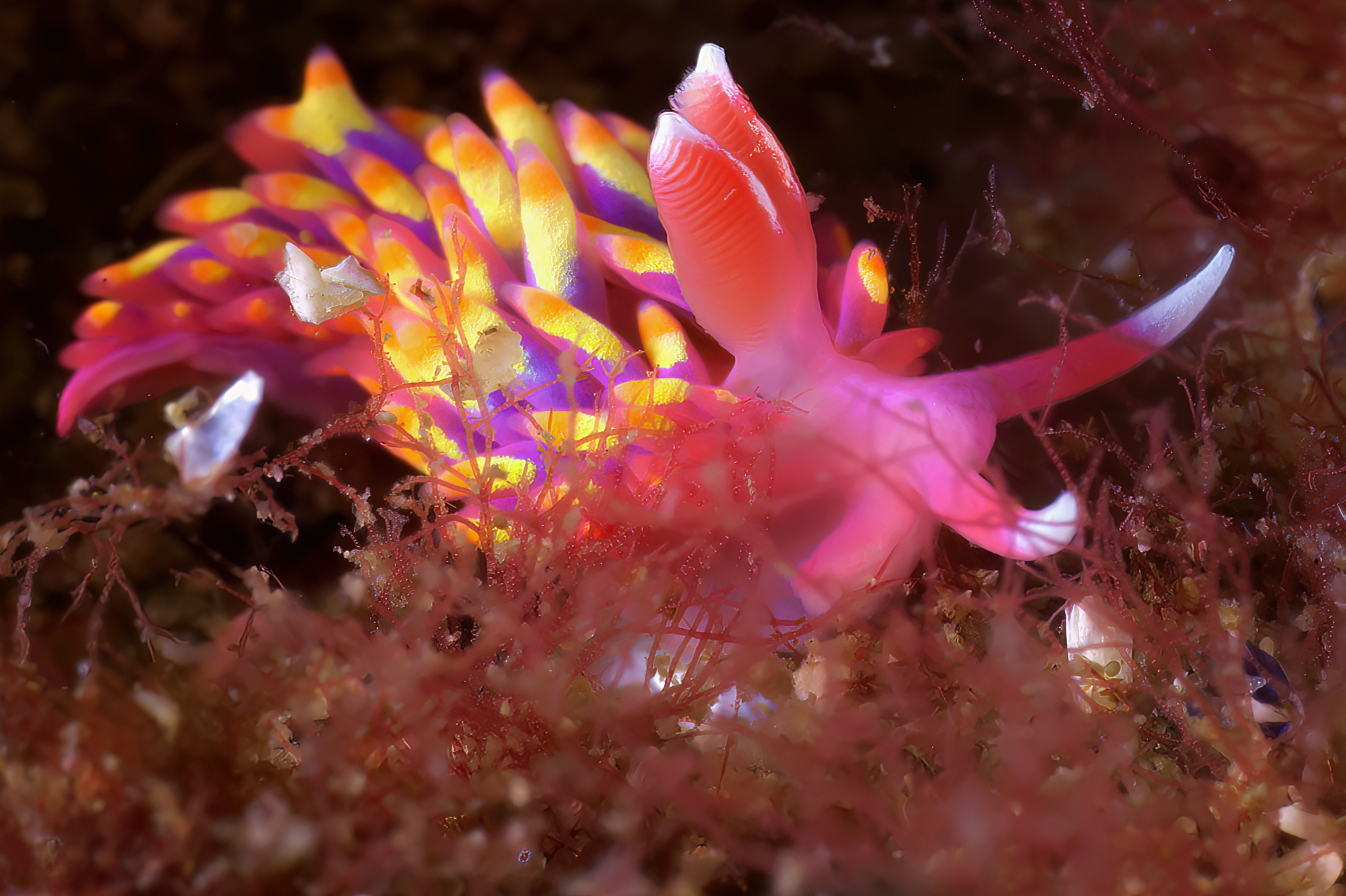

Scientific classification
- Kingdom: Animalia
- Phylum: Mollusca
- Class: Gastropoda
- Order: Nudibranchia
- Suborder: Aeolidacea
- Family: Babakinidae
- Genus: Babakina
- Species: B. anadoni

Binomial name
- Babakina anadoni (Ortea, 1979)

= Babakina anadoni =

Species of gastropod

Babakina anadoni is a species of sea slug, an aeolid nudibranch in the family Babakinidae.

== Taxonomy ==
The species was first described in 1979 and placed in the genus Rioselleolis (named after Ribadesella, Asturias, where the holotype was found), but has subsequently been assigned to the genus Babakina. The species was named to honour Emilio Anadón Frutos (1917–1997) who was a professor of zoology and marine biology at the University of Oviedo, Spain.

== Description ==
It is multicoloured and grows to 2 cm in length. The ground colour of its body is a shade of purple. Its chemosensory organs (rhinophores) and other structures covering the surface of the body (cerata) are contrasting shades of purple as well as different colours including blue, white, yellow and pink.

== Distribution and habitat ==
It is found in warm Atlantic waters, including off the west coast of Spain, the Canary Islands and the coastlines of Portugal and rarely southern France. It is also known from the western Atlantic in The Bahamas, as well as the French Caribbean and the coast of Brazil. Records of the species from temperate waters are also known; in 2022 an individual was found off the Isles of Scilly of the United Kingdom, north of its typical distribution. Another was found in a rock pool at Falmouth, Cornwall, even further north, in May 2023.
