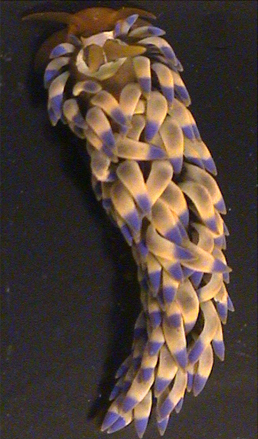
- Live Baeolidia moebii, head end towards the top of the image

Scientific classification
- Kingdom: Animalia
- Phylum: Mollusca
- Class: Gastropoda
- Order: Nudibranchia
- Suborder: Aeolidacea
- Family: Aeolidiidae
- Genus: Baeolidia
- Species: B. moebii

Binomial name
- Baeolidia moebii Bergh, 1888

Synonyms
- Baeolidia major Eliot, 1903; Baeolidia major amakusana Baba, 1937; Spurilla major (Eliot, 1903)

= Baeolidia moebii =

Species of gastropod

Baeolidia moebii is a species of sea slug, an aeolid nudibranch, a marine gastropod mollusk in the family Aeolidiidae.

== Distribution ==
This species was described from Mauritius and has been reported widely in the tropical and subtropical waters of the Indo-Pacific Ocean. It is a predator of the sea anemone Cricophorus nutrix.
