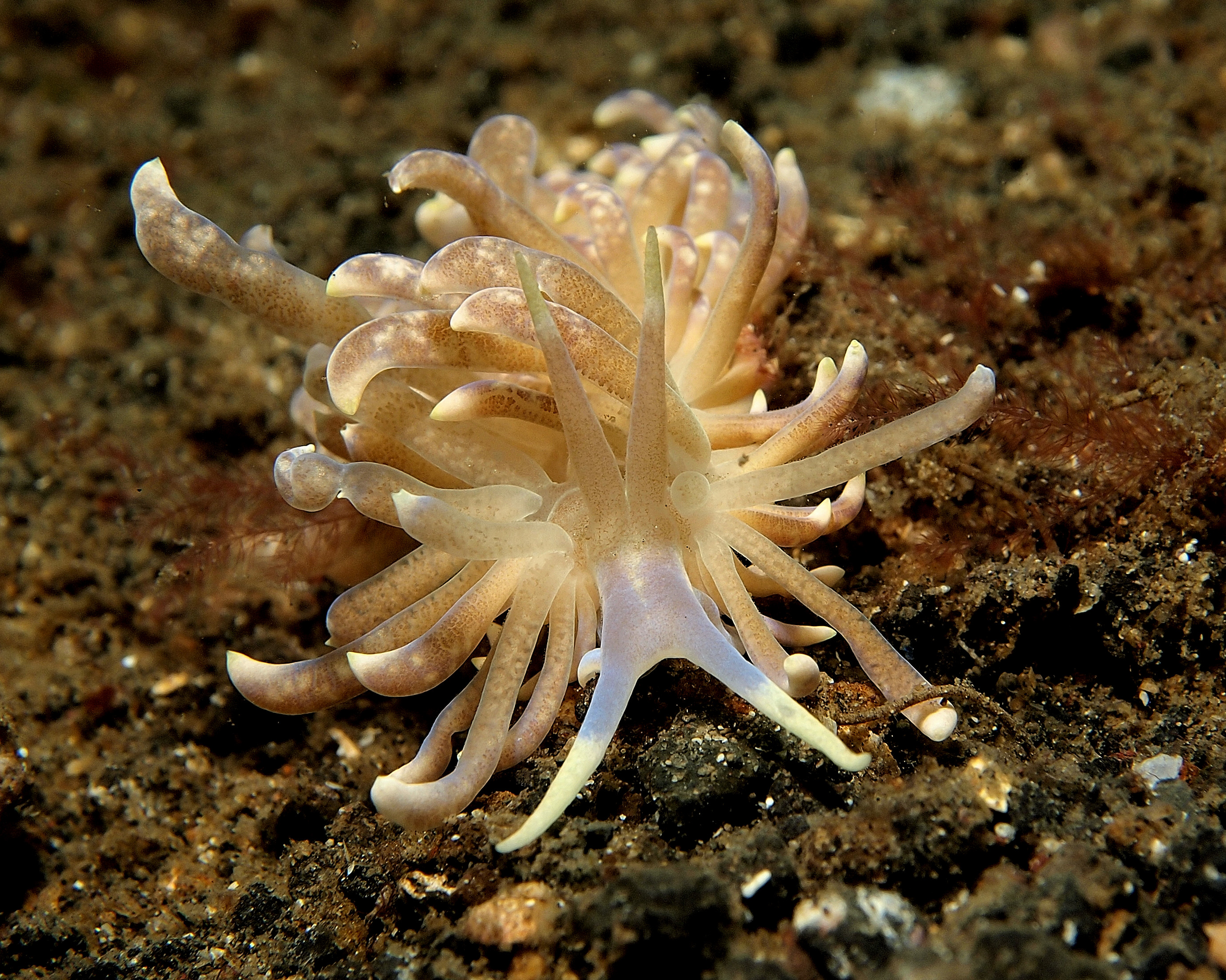
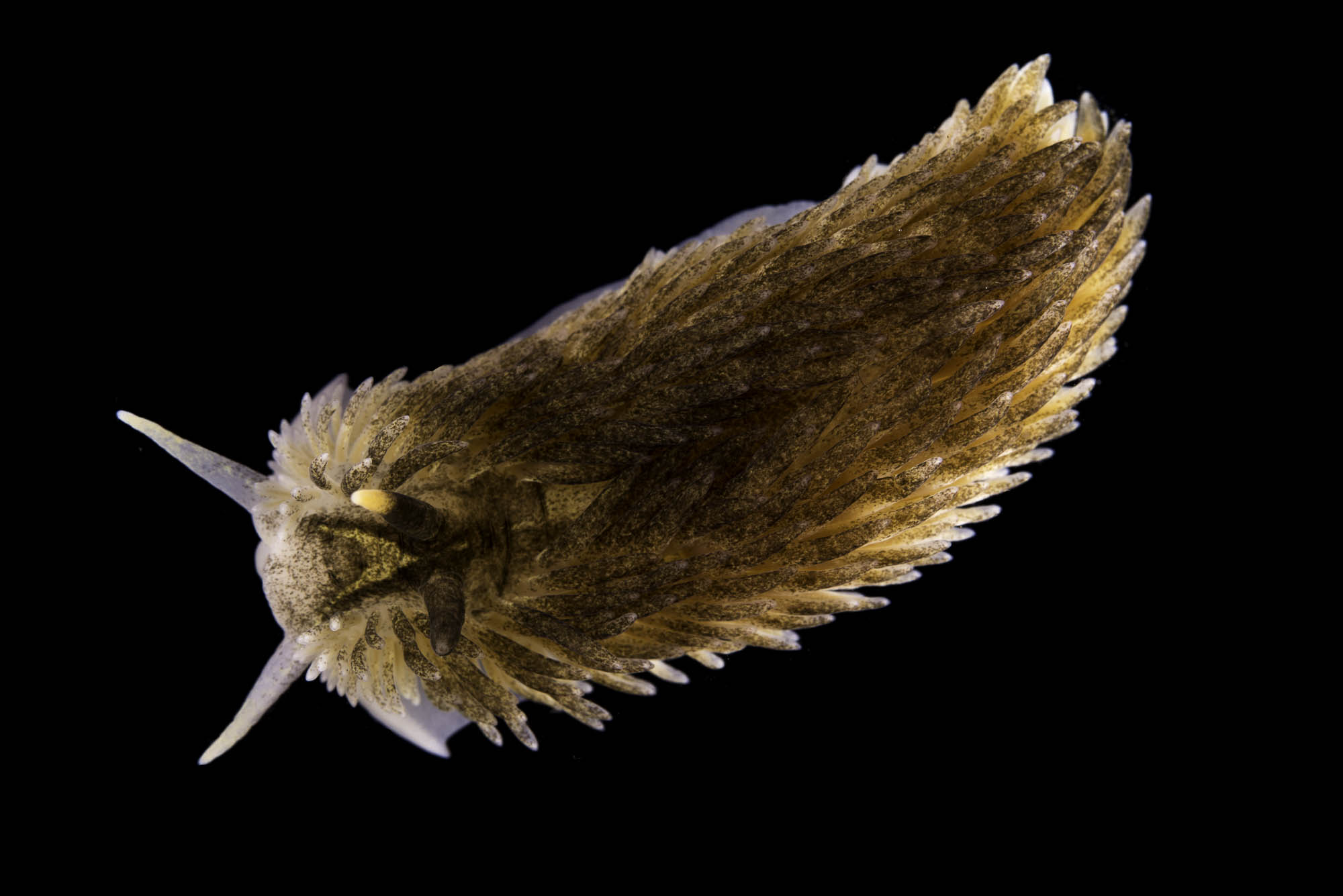
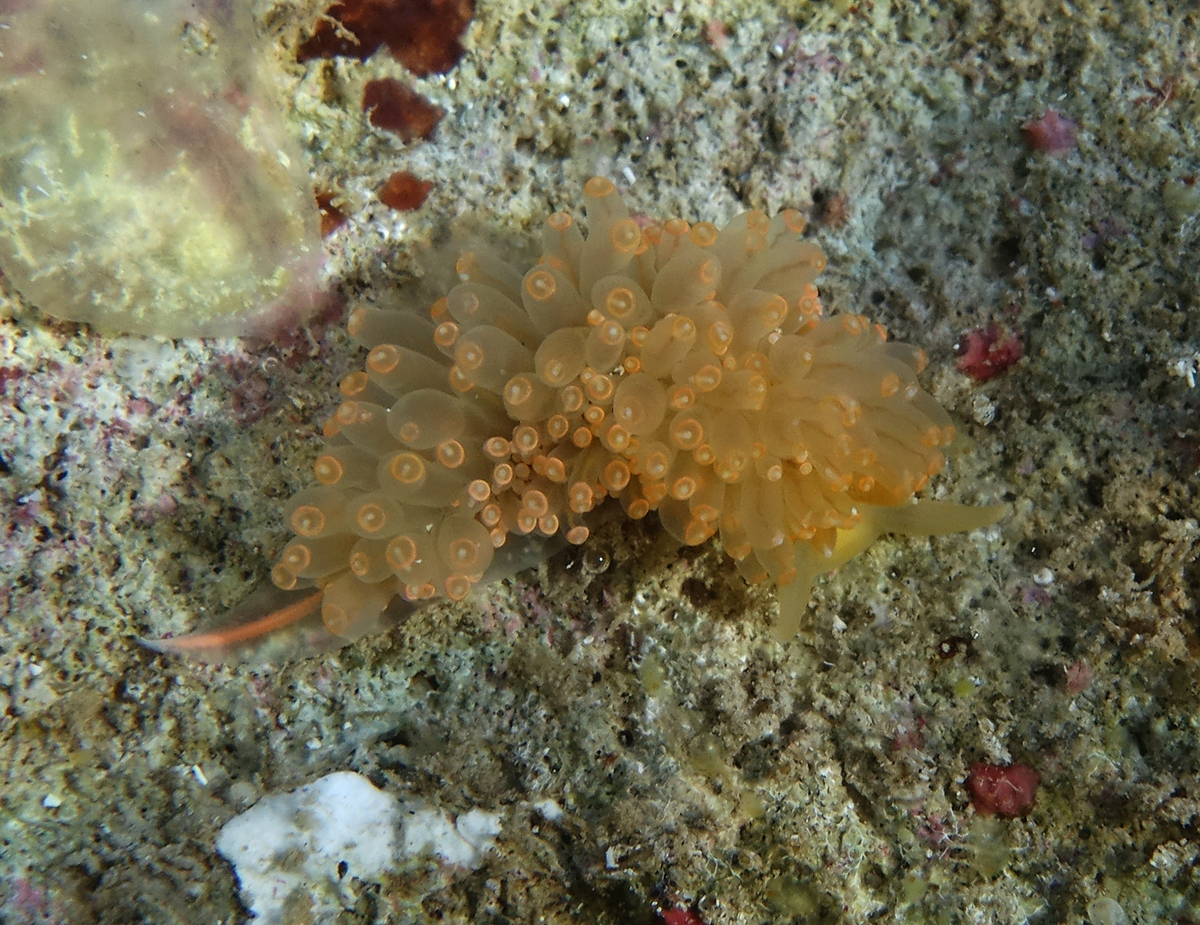
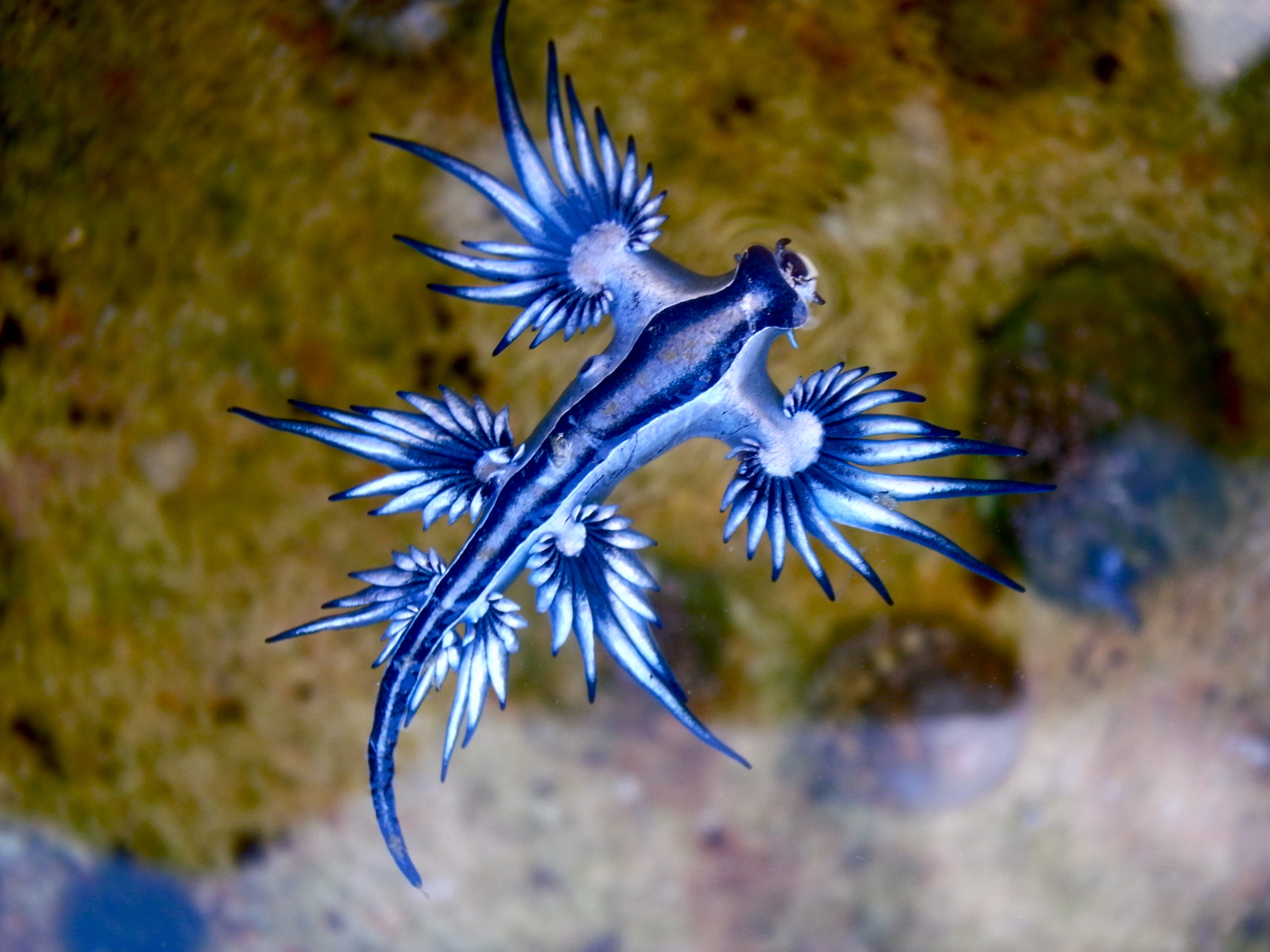
- From left to right of each row, from top to bottom: Phyllodesmium sp. (Myrrhinidae), Aeolidia filomenae (Aeolidiidae), Facelina rhodopos (Facelinidae), and Glaucus atlanticus (Glaucidae)

Scientific classification
- Kingdom: Animalia
- Phylum: Mollusca
- Class: Gastropoda
- Order: Nudibranchia
- Suborder: Aeolidacea
- Superfamily: Aeolidioidea; J.E. Gray, 1827

Families
- See Taxonomy

= Aeolidioidea =

Superfamily of gastropods

Aeolidioidea is a superfamily of nudibranchs, shell-less marine gastropod molluscs or sea slugs, in the suborder Aeolidacea.

== Taxonomy ==
Gosliner et al. (2007) elevated the subfamily Babakininae, which was within Facelinidae, to the family level, as Babakinidae.

In 2017, Bouchet and colleagues listed the following families inside Aeolidioidea:

- Family Aeolidiidae Gray, 1827
- Family Babakinidae Roller, 1973
- Family Facelinidae Bergh, 1889
  - Subfamily Facelininae Bergh, 1889
  - Subfamily Crateninae Bergh, 1889
  - Subfamily Favorininae Bergh, 1889
  - Subfamily Herviellinae Burn, 1967
  - Subfamily Pteraeolidiinae Risbec, 1953
- Family Glaucidae Gray, 1827
- Family Piseinotecidae Edmunds, 1970
- Family Pleurolidiidae Burn, 1966
- Family Unidentiidae Millen & Hermosillo, 2012

A study of facelinid relationships in 2019 removed several facelinid genera to the family Myrrhinidae.

=== 2025 revision ===
A 2025 revision of the taxonomy of Aeolidacea by Korshunova and colleagues recognised, based on the results of molecular phylogenetic analysises, the following families in the superfamily Aeolidioidea:

- Family Aeolidiidae Gray, 1827
- Family Babakinidae Roller 1973
- Family Facelinidae Bergh, 1899
- Family Favorinidae Bergh, 1899
- Family Glaucidae Gray, 1827
- Family Myrrhinidae Bergh, 1905
- Family Pleurolidiidae Burn, 1966
