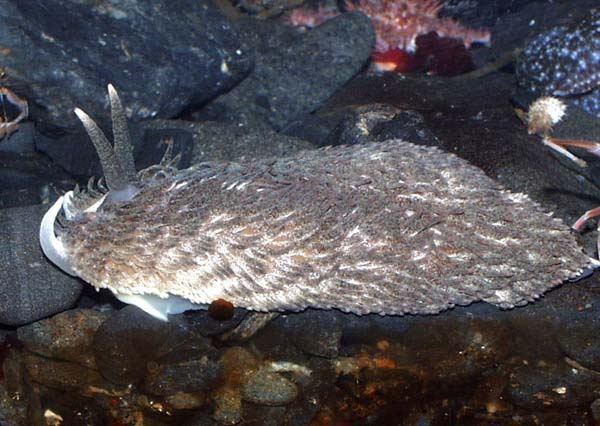
- Aeolidia papillosa

Scientific classification
- Kingdom: Animalia
- Phylum: Mollusca
- Class: Gastropoda
- Order: Nudibranchia
- Suborder: Aeolidacea
- Superfamily: Aeolidioidea
- Family: Aeolidiidae; Orbigny, 1834

Genera
- See Genera

Synonyms
- Aeolididae; Eolidininae (Invalid: Placed on the Official Index by ICZN Opinion 780); Pleurolidiidae; Protaeolidiellidae; Spurillidae

= Aeolidiidae =

Family of molluscs

Aeolidiidae is a family of aeolid nudibranchs. Most, or perhaps all, members of this family feed on sea anemones and have a distinctive single row of comb-shaped serrated radular teeth.

Excluding Pleurolidia juliae, Aeolidiidae is monophyletic. Within Aeolidioidea, Aeolidiidae is one of the largest families, whose members differ from the rest of aeolids by their pectinate radular teeth and their diet –most of them feed on anemones.

== Genera ==
According to Korshunova and colleagues (2025), the following genera are recognised in the family Aeolidiidae:

- Aeolidia Cuvier, 1798
- Aeolidiella Bergh, 1867
- Aeolidiopsis Pruvot-Fol, 1956
- Anteaeolidiella M. C. Miller, 2001
- Baeolidia Bergh, 1888
- Berghia Trinchese, 1877
- Bulbaeolidia Carmona, Pola, Gosliner & Cervera, 2013
- Cerberilla Bergh, 1873
- Limenandra Haefelfinger and Stamm, 1958
- Novaeolidiella Carmona, Martín-Hervás, Pola, Gosliner & Cervera, 2026
- Spurilla Bergh, 1864
- Zeusia Korshunova et al., 2017
