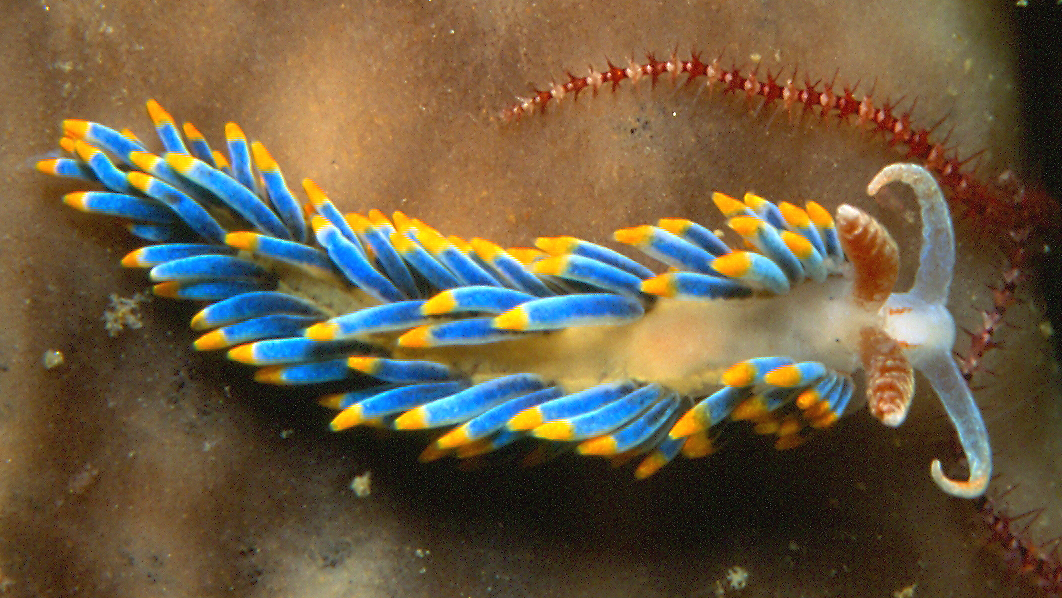

Scientific classification
- Kingdom: Animalia
- Phylum: Mollusca
- Class: Gastropoda
- Order: Nudibranchia
- Suborder: Aeolidacea
- Family: Aeolidiidae
- Genus: Berghia
- Species: B. coerulescens

Binomial name
- Berghia coerulescens (Laurillard, 1830)

Synonyms
- Spurilla caerulescens (sic); Eolidia coerulescens Berghia modesta Error in name: Berghia caerulescens (sic)

= Berghia coerulescens =

Species of gastropod

Berghia coerulescens is a species of sea slug, a marine nudibranch in the family Aeolidiidae. It is the type species of the genus Berghia.

== Distribution ==
Originally described from the French Mediterranean coast, this species is also known from different localities along the central and western Mediterranean (including the Adriatic Sea). It also occurs in the Atlantic Ocean, from the Brittany coasts to the Canary Islands. The geographic distribution of this species has been controversial. Some specimens of Berghia marcusi and Berghia stephanieae from the western Atlantic, as well as Berghia verrucicornis and Berghia columbina from the eastern Atlantic, were grouped under the colour variability of Berghia coerulescens. It is now known that the distribution of Berghia coerulescens is restricted to the eastern Atlantic and the Mediterranean Sea.

== Description ==
This species can grow to a maximum length between 40 and 70 mm.

== In the aquarium ==
Although some references state that Berghia coerulescens and other members of Berghia will feed on Aiptasia sp. (sea anemones that are usually considered pests in the marine aquarium hobby), the species most mentioned in Internet forums and articles for the control of Aiptasia anemones is now known to be Berghia stephanieae.
