= Pedal laceration =

Mode of reproduction in sea anemones

Pedal laceration is a type of fragmentation, which is itself a form of asexual reproduction, exhibited by sea anemones. In this process, a fragment of the pedal disc, which connects the anemone to its substrate, detaches and develops into a new, genetically identical individual.

== Biology and anatomy ==
A simple diagram depicting the general anatomy of an anemone polyp. 6 indicates the pedal disc, which covers the basal surface of the polyp and connects to the substrate below.

Pedal laceration is visually different from other common modes of asexual reproduction by virtue of the location of tissue separation. Budding and fission (both common reproductive strategies in Cnidaria) occur near the tentacles and down the center of the body, respectively. Pedal laceration involves the fragmentation and separation of tissue from the base of the polyp of anemones near the pedal disc.

The frequency of pedal laceration is highly dependent on the presence of environmental stressors. Higher rates of laceration have been observed in anemones attached to unstable substrata, both oceanic sediment and Rhodoliths. This behavior may help clonal populations respond to the movements of nearby locomotive mussels, whether to avoid burial by upturned sediment or to colonize empty patches of substratum left behind.

Laceration is exhibited by genera such as Actinia tenebrosa, Aiptasia pallida,Aiptasia diaphana, and Metridium senile.

== Mechanism ==
Pedal laceration in a sea anemone. Section 1 shows an anemone, with its pedal disc shown in red. Section 2 shows parts of the anemone's pedal disc tearing off as it moves. Section 3 shows a torn-off part of the pedal disc developed into a new anemone. This anemone is genetically identical to the parent.

Pedal laceration takes place through two primary mechanisms: tearing and constriction.

Laceration by tearing usually occurs when the animal moves and leaves behind parts of its pedal disc, which may contain some mesentery, or parts of its columnar trunk. The part left behind can potentially measure over a centimeter in width. Laceration by tearing may also be observed in cases where the anemone extends and leaves a piece behind as it retracts.

Laceration by constriction involves small pieces, measuring under a centimeter, of the parent anemone, pieces that contain parts of the pedal disc, mesentery, and column constricting into separate entities. After detaching from the parent body, the pieces may move, or they may stay close to the parent.

== Factors ==
=== Temperature of water ===
Pedal laceration typically occurs in seawater with temperatures exceeding 20 °C, but activity diminishes as the temperature drops. It is infrequently observed when monthly average temperatures fall below 15 °C. Elevated temperatures can boost metabolic processes, thereby increasing the rate of pedal laceration. While warmer temperatures may facilitate the healing of lacerated areas, excessively high temperatures can induce stress. For instance, in Haliplanella luciae, the rate of fission is influenced by temperature. Likewise, temperature has been shown to impact the fission rate in Diadumene luciae.

=== Rate of water flow ===
Moderate currents can enhance the dispersal of pedal fragments, thereby supporting reproductive processes. Conversely, strong currents or manual cutting can lead to lacerations. In the case of Metridium senile, water flow has been demonstrated to affect asexual reproduction.

=== Light ===
Continuous darkness significantly increases the rate of pedal laceration in Aiptasia pulchella. In contrast, light conditions reduce the rate of asexual reproduction. In the study, anemones kept in continuous darkness produced nearly twice as many lacerates as those kept in light. Additionally, no effect of light was found on the rate of asexual reproduction in Anthopleura elegantissima.

=== Oxygen intake level ===
Aiptasia experiences higher rates of pedal laceration when the oxygen concentration in the water is reduced.

=== Competition for space ===
In marine hard-substrate environments, space is frequently a vital and limiting resource. High densities can lead to crowding, which may trigger asexual reproduction as a means of survival in such conditions.

=== Food availability ===
Anemones that are well-fed may dedicate more energy to reproductive processes. On the other hand, a lack of food or restricted resources can either prevent laceration or, in certain cases, trigger it as a method of survival. For instance, research indicates that starvation can lead to higher rates of asexual reproduction in species such as Anthopleura elegantissima and Aiptasia geton comatus. Moreover, the presence of zooxanthellae has been found to promote pedal laceration during times of starvation. Additionally, the pedal laceration observed in Metridium senile has been linked to the availability of zooplankton.

=== Feeding rates ===
Feeding rates do not have a notable impact on the pedal laceration rate in Aiptasia pulchella. In contrast, other species, such as Haliplanella luciae, have demonstrated that feeding rates can directly affect asexual reproduction.

=== Substrate type ===
Mature anemones are more likely to undergo laceration, and to produce more lacerate offspring, when the substrate beneath them is unstable. This allows clonal populations to recolonize upturned substrata, as individuals are unable to prevent themselves from being buried.

=== Presence of symbiotic Dinoflagellates ===
The existence of symbiotic zooxanthellae can significantly impact the energy budget of sea anemones, which may, in turn, influence the rate of pedal laceration. The availability of light, affecting the photosynthesis of zooxanthellae, plays an important role in this process. In Aiptasia pulchella, the release of zooxanthellae under dark conditions results in a decrease in energy density, potentially leading to an increased rate of pedal laceration.

Having algae as symbionts improves energy availability, thereby promoting growth and survival. For instance, in a study by Glennon, it was found that symbiotic anemones outperformed aposymbiotic ones in terms of growth. Additionally, anemones that experienced reduced symbiont density through cold-shock treatment produced more pedal lacerates compared to those with a high density of symbionts. Notably, symbiotic lacerates did not show a faster developmental rate than aposymbiotic lacerates during the initial stages.

=== Parental and initial lateral size ===
The success rate of lacerate offspring is largely unaffected by the fitness or size of the parents and is primarily influenced by the initial sizes of the lacerate in relation to the development rate of Exaiptasia diaphana. Although the size of the parent anemone can affect the size of the produced pedal lacerates, it does not have a meaningful impact on the number of lacerates generated. For instance, while larger anemones typically yield larger pedal lacerates, the initial size of the parent does not significantly alter the total number of lacerates produced.

== Benefits ==
Pedal laceration is a convenient, safe, and energy-efficient method for sea anemones to reproduce and spread, particularly in environments where their current form and genetics are already well-suited. This method of asexual reproduction has several ecological and biological advantages:

=== Efficient and Low-Energy Reproduction ===
Pedal laceration requires significantly less energy than sexual reproduction. It bypasses the complex processes of gamete formation, fertilization, and larval development. Research on the sea anemone Aiptasia pulchella has demonstrated that the reproductive effort (RE) associated with pedal laceration is extremely low, ranging from 0.004 to 0.044. This minimal energy investment correlates with a high rate of asexual reproduction, making pedal laceration a highly efficient reproductive strategy.

=== Rapid Colony Formation ===
Pedal laceration enables sea anemones to quickly colonize favorable areas by producing numerous offspring in a short amount of time. This method is especially advantageous in environments where space is limited, such as coral reefs or tide pools, allowing anemones to outcompete other species for space. Their ability to regenerate and proliferate rapidly through pedal laceration contributes to their success in these competitive habitats.

=== Clonal Expansion in Stable Environments ===
Since pedal laceration results in the production of clones, it is particularly beneficial in stable environments where the parent's genotype has proven successful. This guarantees that offspring are well-adapted to the existing conditions. Research indicates that clones of sea anemones can adapt to specific microhabitats, suggesting that clonal expansion through pedal laceration can lead to fine-scale adaptations in stable environments.

=== Survival Strategy ===
If a parent anemone suffers damage or is under threat, the lacerated pedal fragments can regenerate into new individuals, essentially serving as a backup survival mechanism. This remarkable regenerative ability allows sea anemones to recover from partial tissue loss due to predation or environmental disturbances, contributing to their overall resilience.

=== Minimal Movement Needed ===
Given that anemones are primarily sedentary, pedal laceration does not necessitate finding mates or extensive movement, which is ideal for solitary or sparsely distributed populations. This reproductive method enables them to expand their presence in an area without the need for significant mobility. The process involves small fragments detaching from the pedal disc, which then develop into new individuals, thereby facilitating local population growth.
