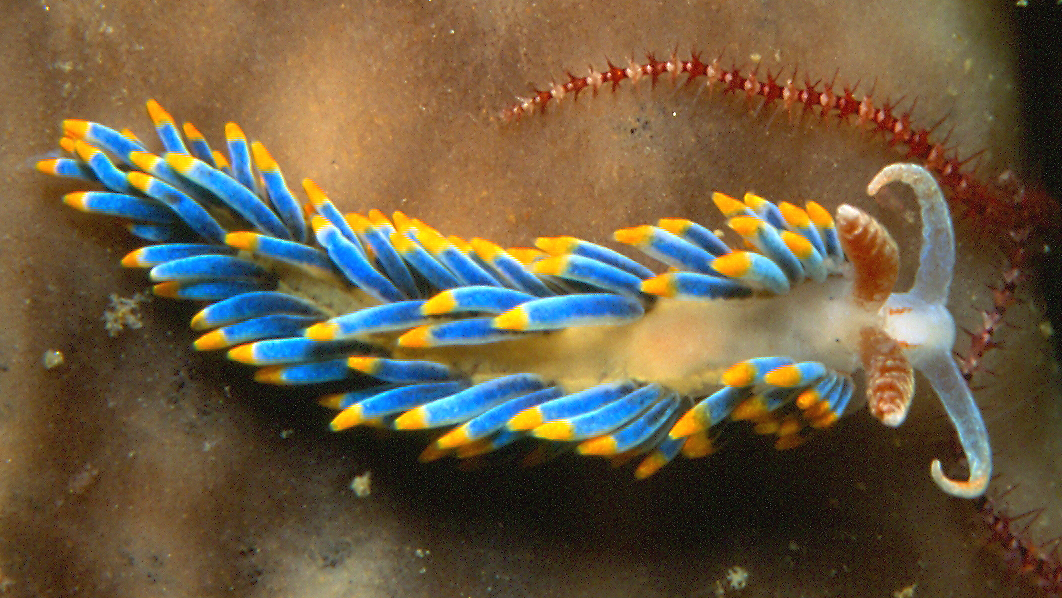
- Berghia coerulescens

Scientific classification
- Kingdom: Animalia
- Phylum: Mollusca
- Class: Gastropoda
- Order: Nudibranchia
- Suborder: Aeolidacea
- Family: Aeolidiidae
- Genus: Berghia; Trinchesea, 1877

Type species
- Eolidia coerulescens Laurillard, 1830

Synonyms
- Millereolidia Ortea, Caballer & Espinosa, 2004; Milleria Ortea, Caballer & Espinosa, 2003 (preoccupied name)

= Berghia =

Genus of gastropods

Berghia is a genus of sea slugs, aeolid nudibranchs. They are shell-less marine gastropod molluscs in the family Aeolidiidae. They are covered in cerata which give them their unique tentacle look and color. Berghia are commonly found in shallow waters and their diet consists of strictly Aiptasia anemone. This genus is now commonly used commercially to fight off sea anemone populations in fish tanks.

== Life-history ==
The validity of the genus Berghia has been contested for years since its discovery in 1877. It has been questioned mostly due to their phenotypic similarities to the genus Spurilla despite having unique colorations. The monophyly of Berghia started to be highly supported after the addition of Berghia stephanieae and later results have proven that Spurilla and Berghia were not as closely related as previously thought.

== Habitat ==
The genus Berghia is known to be found in warm and temperate waters and is strictly located in the Caribbean, Atlantic, and Mediterranean. The species Berghia verrucicornis has recently been spotted in Brittany which is the northernmost finding for this animal. Their small size allows them to live under rocks and corals in shallow water which gives them a better position to not only hide, but to eat their chosen prey, Aiptasia.

== Diet and fish tank applications ==
Berghia have a strict diet of only Aiptasia anemone. They do however receive short-term sustenance from symbiosis with zooxanthellae which come from their cnidarian prey. These sea anemones can be found on mangrove roots as well as in rocks and dead corals. They are found in the tropical and temperate waters in the benthic zone and are mostly located in the Western Atlantic Ocean, Caribbean, Mediterranean, and in the North Western pacific . Aiptasia have become a common problem in marine tanks due to their spores going undetected in water because it has not been processed correctly. Aiptasia replicate quickly through asexual reproduction and can soon take over any tank. Since Berghia only eat Aiptasia, many tank owners have turned to using this genus commercially to reduce the populations. Berghia are now sold through online sources as a consumer product to manage Aiptasia anemone outbreaks. Berghia will eat the anemone starting at the base and then the Aiptasia will start to sink down inside of the hole of the rock they are living on. Berghia will then make their way up to the top and consume the oral disk last. This prevents the anemone from feeling threatened and stinging the Berghia. This genus has special sensory organs called rhinophores that can chemically detect Aiptasia anemones. This is an essential mechanism because it allows them to find these anemones even if they're not easily seen.

== Anatomy ==
All species in the genus Berghia share similar anatomy, which make it very difficult to tell them apart. Most adults will grow to about 25mm. Among the genus, body shape, oral and salivary glands, tail shape, and rhinophoral papillae have been examined and remain uniform across all species. The morphological variability comes from their radular teeth, ceratal arrangement, and rhinophore ornamentation. Berghia have dense rhinophores which are long tentacles that function as chemo-receptors to locate food sources that are far away. Berghia species also have papillae and cerata that are rounded on the posterior side that resemble finger-like projections. These cerata are arranged in arches, have a round apex, and are all uniform in diameter. Cerata are specific to nudibranchs and hold the stinging nematocysts from their prey. Besides defense, cerata also play a part in respiration and digestion. Berghia have oral tentacles that protrude father out than the rhinophores primarily to taste food quality. Right behind the rhinophores are eyes that have very little vision and mostly sense light. Their oral glands are larger, tubular, and composite while their radular teeth are bi-lobed and indented. Compared to other Aeoliids, Berghia have a round apex with longer and slenderer cerata.

== Predators ==
Known predators include shrimp, crabs, and Aiptasia. Night scavenging shrimp are the main predators of Berghia but aggressive crabs will go for these animals as well. If Berghia species are not careful when they approach the Aiptasia anemones, they can be attacked or land on the mouth area which will kill them.

== Defense mechanism ==
Along the backs of these slugs are cerata which are extensions of the digestive system. These cerata contain cnidosacs at the tip which contain nematocysts that are stored from eating the Aiptasia anemone. When the Berghia ingest the anemone, the immature nematocysts are encased within a phagosome and are allowed to mature in the cnidosacs. When startled or attacked, these organisms can eject stinging cells out of the cerata to hurt and scare off predators. The sting will not be as potent as the anemone, but it will still be painful.

== Reproduction ==
Berghia are hermaphroditic but require another individual to mate and fertilize eggs. They can lay eggs every day as long as conditions are good and they have a large source of food. Juveniles can start laying eggs at 28 days old. These eggs are white and are laid in spiral masses and are referred to as an ‘egg ribbon’. Eggs are mainly laid under a rock or beneath coral. For young slugs, there are normally around 60-80 embryos in each cluster but when they mature, they can lay around 1000 to 2000 embryos in each spiral with strong fertilization rates. Hatching times will vary on the species and water conditions, but is normally around 2 weeks. There is a courtship that takes place between two individuals during mating where the genital openings will align. These openings are located behind the rhinophores and their heads must be close together for the process to work.

== Development ==
Berghia eggs hatch within 2 weeks of fertilization. By the end of the second day after fertilization, their bi-lobed velum is clearly visible and their larval shell starts to appear soon after. When larvae hatch from their eggs, they are free-swimming veliger larvae and are fully metamorphosed. They swim by using the many cilia that are located on their body and soon after hatching, the larvae fall to the bottom. In the process of metamorphosis, Berghia species will shed their shell in about 48 hours’ time. They will soon be able to crawl, their bodies will start to lengthen, and their rhinophores and cerata start to develop. Pigmentation follows soon after the organisms start to eat anemones and they harvest the color from their food. The life span for these creatures is around 10 months to a year. The CNS of Berghia verrucicornis has been studied specifically as development occurs. It was found that the cerebral and pleural ganglia fuse to form the prominent cerebropleural ganglia. The rhinophoral ganglia and cerebropleural ganglion develop with a pair of processes extending from each. These processes go to the developing rhinophore and toward the associated structures of the mouth. In a study done on B. stephanieae, it was found that they share post metamorphic condensation of the CNS, rhinophoral ganglia, and a lack of oral tentacle ganglia common to all nudibranchs. However, this species has a specific structure arrangement of their serotonergic apical organ which is similar to their sister groups caenogastropod and opisthobranch.

== Species ==
Species in the genus Berghia include:

- Berghia agari (Smallwood, 1910)
- Berghia amakusana (Baba, 1937)
- Berghia benteva (Er. Marcus, 1958)
- Berghia coerulescens (Laurillard, 1830)
- Berghia columbina (Garcia-Gomez & Thompson, 1990)
- Berghia creutzbergi Er. Marcus & Ev. Marcus, 1970
- Berghia ghanensis Edmunds, 2015
- Berghia marcusi Dominguez, Troncoso & García, 2008
- Berghia marinae Carmona, Pola, Gosliner & Cervera, 2014
- Berghia norvegica Odhner, 1939
- Berghia rissodominguezi Muniain & Ortea, 1999
- Berghia stephanieae (Valdés, 2005)
- Berghia verrucicornis (Costa A., 1867)

Species brought into synonymy

- Berghia chaka Gosliner, 1985: synonym of Baeolidia chaka (Gosliner, 1985)
- Berghia dela Er. Marcus & Ev. Marcus, 1960: synonym of Baeolidia dela (Er. Marcus & Ev. Marcus, 1960)
- Berghia modesta Trinchesea, 1882: synonym of Berghia coerulescens (Laurillard, 1830)
- Berghia dakariensis (Pruvot-Fol, 1953): synonym of Berghia benteva (Er. Marcus, 1958)
