= Robert Trench =

Robert Trench may refer to:

- Robert Le Poer Trench (1811–1895), judge in Victoria, Australia
- Robert K. Trench (born 1940), American biologist
