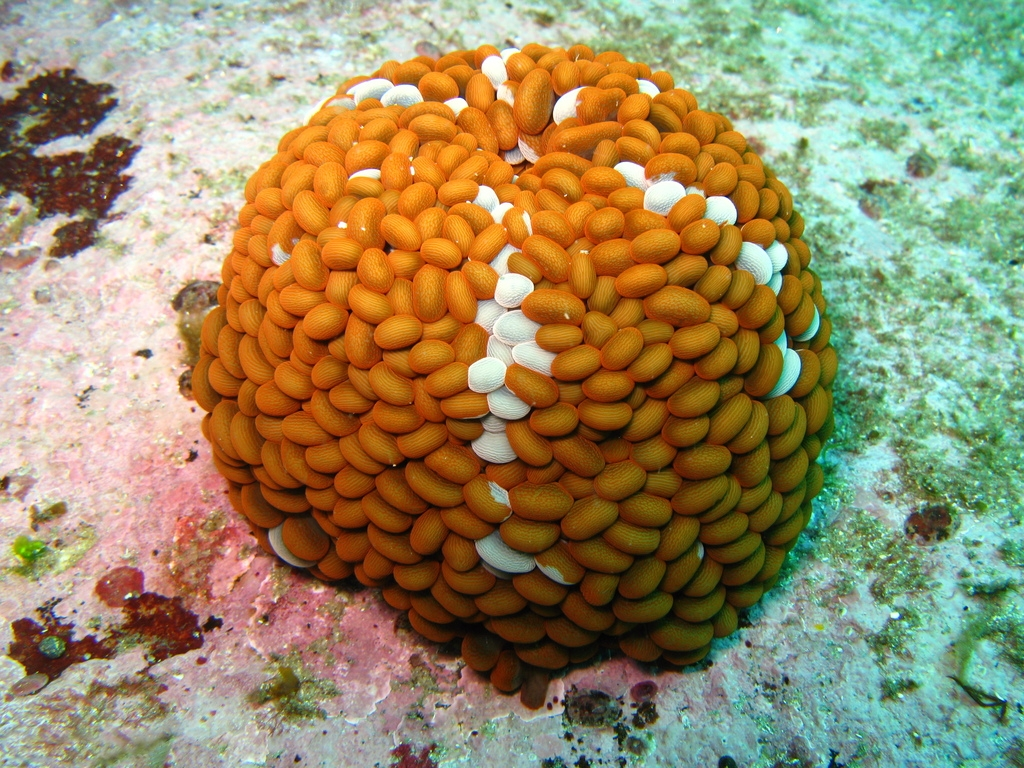

Scientific classification
- Domain: Eukaryota
- Kingdom: Animalia
- Phylum: Cnidaria
- Subphylum: Anthozoa
- Class: Hexacorallia
- Order: Actiniaria
- Family: Actiniidae
- Genus: Phlyctenactis
- Species: P. tuberculosa

Binomial name
- Phlyctenactis tuberculosa (Quoy & Gaimard, 1833)

Synonyms
- List: Actinia tuberculosa Quoy & Gaimard, 1833; Actinecta tuberculosa Quoy & Gaimard, 1833; Cereus tuberculosus; Cystiactis retifera Stuckey; Cystiactis tuberculosa (Quoy & Gaimard, 1833); Phlyctenactis retifera Stuckey, 1909

= Phlyctenactis tuberculosa =

Species of sea anemone

Phlyctenactis tuberculosa, commonly known as the wandering sea anemone or swimming anemone, is a species of sea anemone in the family Actiniidae. It is native to shallow seas around Australia and New Zealand. It was first described by the French zoologist Jean René Constant Quoy and the French naturalist Joseph Paul Gaimard. They were naval surgeons in the French Navy who amassed sizable collections of various organisms while traveling.

== Description ==
This anemone is covered with bubble-like sacks, and comes in a variety of colours from brownish orange, mauve, light grey to brown in colour. The tentacles are lighter, and may be pale yellow, grey, brown or orange-yellow in colour. It grows to a maximum size of 15 centimetres (6 in) in diameter with a column that can reach 25 centimetres (10 in) long. During the day, it remains bundled together, appearing like a ball of baked beans.

== Habitat and behaviour ==
This is a nocturnal species, living in moderately exposed areas and among sheltered reefs at depths to 35 metres. It attaches to rock, seagrasses and kelp, but is able to detach its pedal disc, and is commonly found drifting on the sea floor. It moves about on the seabed by creeping with its basal disc, and at night climbs sea grasses or algae to find a better location to intercept prey floating past.

== Distribution ==
This species occurs in Western Australia, Victoria, South Australia,New South Wales, Tasmania, and New Zealand.

== Venom ==
The wandering sea anemone is venomous and touching the tentacles can cause a painful sting. Swimmers are advised to avoid touching the anemone and to wear protective clothing.
