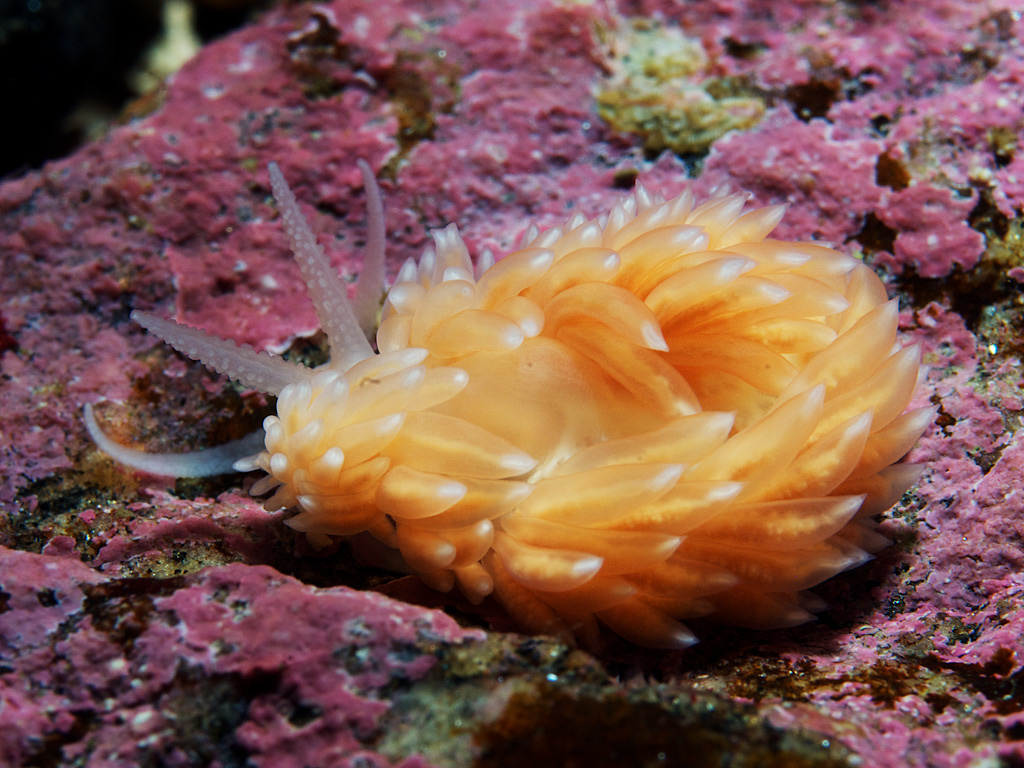
- The nudibranch Berghia norvegica, Gulen Dive Resort, Norway.

Scientific classification
- Kingdom: Animalia
- Phylum: Mollusca
- Class: Gastropoda
- Order: Nudibranchia
- Suborder: Aeolidacea
- Family: Aeolidiidae
- Genus: Berghia
- Species: B. norvegica

Binomial name
- Berghia norvegica Odhner, 1939

= Berghia norvegica =

Species of gastropod

Berghia norvegica is a species of sea slug, an aeolid nudibranch. It is a shell-less marine gastropod mollusc in the family Aeolidiidae.

== Distribution ==
Berghia norvegica was described from Trondheim Fjord. It is known only from a few localities in Norway.

== Ecology ==
This nudibranch feeds on the sea anemone Gonactinia prolifera.
