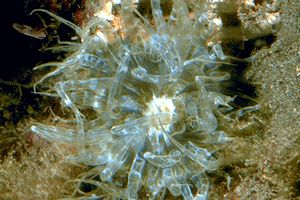

Conservation status
- Least Concern (IUCN 3.1) (Mediterranean)

Scientific classification
- Kingdom: Animalia
- Phylum: Cnidaria
- Subphylum: Anthozoa
- Class: Hexacorallia
- Order: Actiniaria
- Family: Aiptasiidae
- Genus: Aiptasia
- Species: A. mutabilis

Binomial name
- Aiptasia mutabilis Gravenhorst, 1831

= Aiptasia mutabilis =

Species of sea anemone

Aiptasia mutabilis, also known as the Trumpet anemone, Rock anemone, and Glass anemone, is a species of sea anemone typically found attached to substrates in cold waters of the Atlantic Ocean. Its unique trumpet shape gives it its common name and it can grow to be 12 cm, having a column between 3 and 6 cm in size. Like many cnidarians, they rely on nematocysts for protection and to capture prey. They are not difficult to care for, and can be kept in a home aquarium, although due to their speed of reproduction, can quickly become overpopulated.

== Description ==
=== Anatomy and morphology ===
Aiptasia mutabilis is typically trumpet shaped. It can grow to be 12 cm tall, and the column can have a diameter of 3 cm near the base and 6 cm at the mouth of the organism. The tall column is not segmented, and flares outward to a broad oral disc. The tentacles of A. mutabilis are shorter in length at the base, and they grow to be finer as you travel towards the end. The inner tentacles tend to be longer than the ones found towards the outside, and each organism can have up to 100 tentacles. A. mutabilis, like other members of the genus Aiptasia, have specialized stinging cells called nematocysts on their tentacles. When the column of the organism is extended, small perforations, called cinclides, can be observed, while the lower half of the column has numerous warts, which act as adhesive spots to help secure the organism to the substrate. Typically, A. mutabilis is a brownish color with areas that are opaque white. The tentacles are usually brown towards the bottom and turn lighter towards the tips. They can also have blue or green colors radiating throughout their body.

=== Nematocysts ===
Like most nematocysts found in cnidarians, the nematocysts of A. mutabilis injects a tubule of venomous substances as a response to a stimulus. This is typically used to capture prey, and the tubule will either adhere to or inject the prey. The nematocysts of A. mutabilis, like other nematocysts, have an inner organoid that takes up about 80% of the interior. It consists of a three layer capsule that contains a long thread that is coiled in capsule fluid. When there is a stimulus, a rapid eversion of the tubule occurs that penetrates the target's tissue and the toxins of the capsule fluid is injected into the tissue . Volume regulatory methods are important in most cells to keep them functioning, including nematocysts. A. mutabilis is able to regulate cell volume in both hypoosmotic and hypertonic conditions, which is crucial to their survival in changing environments. The presence of Ca^{2+} ions in seawater is needed for proper nematocyst discharge in A. mutabilis. Without Ca^{2+}, the ability of the organism to feed and protect itself is compromised. The nematocyte venom of A. mutabilis contains at least one or more toxins with powerful cytolytic activity. However, conditions of the habitat A. mutabilis lives in impact the cytotoxicity of the venom. A strong cytotoxicity is seen at a pH of 7.5, and at a pH of 4.5 or 9.5, the cytotoxicity was lost entirely. An environment that had a pH that is too low or to high can greatly impact the effect nematocysts have on helping A. mutabilis capture prey and defend itself.

== Predation ==
There are multiple organisms that prey on Aiptasia mutabilis, including various species of butterflyfish, filefish, pufferfish, nudibranchs, some shrimp species, and hermit crabs. These and other organisms prey on Aiptasia mutabilis in the wild and can be put into an aquarium system to keep their numbers down when they become invasive and overpopulate tanks.

== Distribution and habitat ==
Aiptasia mutabilis is usually seen in colder waters. It is typically found adhered to substrates, beneath overhangs, on walls, or on rocks deep under the sea surface. The greatest depth A. mutabilis has been found adhered to substrate was 100m below sea level. This species typically stays in shallower waters, usually at a depth of up to 50 below the surface. It has been found in the Atlantic Ocean, from Ireland to the Canary Islands, along with being found in the Adriatic, Aegean, and Mediterranean seas.

== Reproduction ==
Aiptasia mutabilis has been known to reproduce both asexually and sexually. Although both methods are used, asexual reproduction has been most commonly seen in this species. To reproduce asexually, the anemone splits the column and separates. These two separate parts will adhere to a substrate and individuals will begin to develop from these smaller amounts of tissue from the original individual. This species can be infective, due to the speed at which they can reproduce, and for this reason they are not very popular aquarium anemones. Any tissue could potentially turn into an individual, making them quite prominent in the areas where they are found. To get from zygote to its adult life stage, A mutabilis will undergo metamorphosis. This beings with the morphogenesis of tentacles, septa, and pharynx. From here the larva settles and develops into its adult form.

== Symbiotic relationships ==
Aiptasia mutabilis acts as a host to many different organisms. Algae, rich in fucoxanthin, contribute to its dark brown coloring, and when these algae are not present, the organisms take a lighter, white color. A mutabilis will often turn white after an extended period of time in darkness, which is a condition in which this algae cannot survive. Dinoflagellates have also been known to have a symbiotic relationship with many different cnidarians within the genus Aiptasia, including A. mutabilis.
