= Berghia amakusana =

Scientific classification
- Kingdom: Animalia
- Phylum: Mollusca
- Class: Gastropoda
- Order: Nudibranchia
- Suborder: Aeolidacea
- Family: Aeolidiidae
- Genus: Berghia
- Species: B. amakusana

Binomial name
- Berghia amakusana (Baba, 1937)

Synonyms
- Baeolidia major amakusana Baba, 1937; Baeolidia major Baba, non Eliot

Species of gastropod

Berghia amakusana is a species of sea slug, an aeolid nudibranch. It is a shell-less marine gastropod mollusc in the family Aeolidiidae.

== Distribution ==
This species was described from Tomioka, Fukushima, Japan.
