= Robert K. Trench =

American biologist

Robert Kent Trench
- Education: University of California, Los Angeles; University of the West Indies
- Scientific career
- Workplaces: University of California, Santa Barbara
- Thesis: The physiology and biochemistry of Zooxanthellae symbiotic with manne coelenterates (1969)

Robert Kent Trench (August 3, 1940 - April 27, 2021) was an American Biologist who was a professor at the University of California, Santa Barbara. His research considered corals and symbiotic algae, with a focus on the adaption of zooxanthellae. He was awarded the 1994 International Society of Endocytobiology Miescher-Ishida Prize.

== Early life and education ==
Trench was born in Belize City in British Honduras. Where he was raised by his grandmother and lived in close proximity to the islands along Belize’s barrier reef. As a result would spend a lot of his free time in the water around them which led him to grow close to nature. For school he attended the Jesuit High School in Belize City. He would often cite the education he received there as serving him for the rest of his life. This in combination with his relationship with nature is likely what led to his successful career in marine science. He earned his undergraduate degree at the University of the West Indies. He moved to the University of California, Los Angeles for his doctoral research, where he focussed on invertebrate zoology in the laboratory of Leonard Muscatine. Trench earned his doctorate in 1969 and moved to the University of Oxford as a postdoctoral fellow.

== Research and career ==
Trench became an assistant professor of Biology at Yale University in 1972 before moving in 1976 and joining the staff at University of California Santa Barbara as a professor. While at UCSB he taught a course on the biology and geology of coral reefs as well as a co-instructor for an Invertebrate biology course. He was once quoted about his teaching saying, “I want to teach them how to learn on their own, so that I become irrelevant.” After 28 years he retired from teaching in 2000. His research considered corals and symbiotic algae, with a focus on the adaption of zooxanthellae and how they adapt to different coral environments. He studied dinoflagellates, which can be used as an indicator of water quality.

Some of Trench’s most impactful work is his research on animal-dinoflagellate mutualisms. Trench redefined the global perspective on host/symbiont relationships. During the 1970s and 1980s, the prevailing view on this symbiosis was that the host dominated the relationship and fully controlled the symbiont. Through his research, Trench challenged this mindset and concluded that the symbiont’s attributes are critical to the establishment and maintenance of the symbiotic relationship.

Trench pursued his doctoral degree at the University of California, Los Angeles under the guidance of his advisor, Leonard Muscatine. Muscatine used radioactive carbon-14 to measure the exchange rates of carbon from the symbiont to the animal. Here, Trench focused his dissertation research on the transfer rates and total amounts of photosynthetically fixed carbon translocated to the animal from its symbiont. By isolating various symbionts from their hosts, Trench determined that different symbionts did not produce the same photosynthetic products. This work foreshadowed the idea we now hold to be true today: not all symbionts are the same. This work further proved the symbiont also plays a critical role in the host’s life.

Trench’s first research paper was published in the journal Nature in 1969 on the topic of photosynthetic animals. It was published while Trench was a post-doctoral scholar at Oxford University but still remains one of his favorites. While research at the time rejected the importance of agal chloroplasts in sea slugs, his research disproved this belief. Trench demonstrated that even after being engulfed by the sea slug’s digestive cells, the ingested chloroplasts were still functional. His work showed that chloroplasts continued to photosynthesize for extended periods of time following engulfment and functioned as “captive” intracellular organelles. The animals reaped the benefits of additional and reliable nutrients from their photosynthetic inhabitants. Trench was awarded the Miescher-Ishida Prize for his innovative work.

In 1972, Trench moved to Yale University as an Assistant Professor where his research dissertation was mentored by Luigi Provasoli. Trench built on Provasoli’s work by isolating numerous cell cultures from various hosts. From this, Trench, along with his graduate student Dave Schoenberg, showed that isolated cultures were fundamentally different when grown under the same environmental conditions such as nutrient, light, and temperature. Using karyotypes, they also showed that the genus Symbiodinium sensu lato comprised more than just one species.

Trench moved to the University of California, Santa Barbara in 1976. Trench guided the first detailed research examining the differences in photo physiological capacities of different symbiont species. This work contributed to the characterization of the photosynthetic apparatus of dinoflagellates. By doing so, they found that different species possessed distinct photo physiological adaptations.

Trench’s lab also showed that these symbionts are sensitive to temperature stress, and laid the groundwork for later research on preventing and remediating coral bleaching. Additionally, Trench established the functional biological and ecological significance of symbiont diversity to reef-building corals. Trench worked with his graduate student Roberto Igelsias-Prieto to develop a concept on how host-symbiont combinations partially determine coral physiological responses to environmental pressures. Their work also explained how corals possessing large biogeographic distributions could occupy a broad range of habitats and depths. The groundbreaking research Trench did on corals laid the foundations for current coral restoration efforts. Much of Trench’s lab work was focused in the laboratory. His lab used Aiptasia sea anemones and Cassiopea jellyfishes as experimental models to study host-symbiont relationships under controlled conditions to characterize the cellular processes involved in host-symbiont relationships as well as determine patterns of host-symbiont specificity.

To extend on his interests in symbiotic relationships, Trench studied the mutualism between single-celled flagellates (cyanophora paradoza) and photosynthetic bacteria (cyanocyta korshikoffiana). From this, he determined that the flagellates rely on the photosynthetic processes of the cyanobacteria making it a mutually obligate relationship. This relationship is an ideal model for studying the evolution of chloroplasts. Much of Trench’s work and original insights remain the basis of ongoing investigations today.

In 1984 Trench was awarded a Senior Queen Elizabeth II Fellowship to move to Australia and study the Great Barrier Reef. He visited the James Cook University, where he analyzed the enzymes in the algae within coral tissues.

In 1994 he was awarded the International Society of Endocytobiology Miescher-Ishida Prize. In 2010 he was awarded the Healthy Reefs for Healthy People Lifetime Achievement Award.

He serves as an advisor for the Global Coral Reef Alliance. He retired from academic science in 2000,

== Experience as a Minority in Science ==
Bob’s roots were a melting pot consisting of indigenous Central American, Spanish, African, and Jewish lineages. As a result he encountered many acts of racism in his years in the United States. On several occasions while at UCSB Trench was stopped and questioned by police because he did not “look like he belonged on campus.” Even more unfairly Bob would have to watch as his white colleagues were given grants for their research as he was told his work was “too interdisciplinary” to receive any grants and was never given a proper review. Regarding this he was quoted as saying “No matter what I do in science, to some people I will always just be a [slur]...” to his long term colleague and friend Tom Goreau Jr. Tom Goreau Jr’s father, Tom Goreau Sr. had been training Bob to be the Director of the Discovery Bay Marine Lab (DBML) after he finished his Post-Doctoral fellowship at Oxford University and could return to Jamaica, when he suddenly died of cancer in 1970. This placed the control of the Director of the DBML in the hands of the British Zoology Department who immediately eliminated Bob from contention as they decided a White man was needed for the position. Despite all of this, Bob was never afraid of vocalizing his experience as a minority and the racial biases that he encountered. He hoped that his responses to these situations would help to inspire future students and peers.

== Selected publications ==
Goreau, Thomas J. Trench, Robert Kent (2013). Innovative methods of marine ecosystem restoration. CRC Press. ISBN 978-1-4665-5773-4. OCLC 873617993.

Iglesias-Prieto, R.; Matta, J. L.; Robins, W. A.; Trench, R. K. (1992-11-01). "Photosynthetic response to elevated temperature in the symbiotic dinoflagellate Symbiodinium microadriaticum in culture". Proceedings of the National Academy of Sciences. 89 (21): 10302–10305. Bibcode:1992PNAS...8910302I. doi:10.1073/pnas.89.21.10302. ISSN 0027-8424. PMC 50326. PMID 11607337.

Iglesias-Prieto, R; Trench, RK (1994). "Acclimation and adaptation to irradiance in symbiotic dinoflagellates. I. Responses of the photosynthetic unit to changes in photon flux density". Marine Ecology Progress Series. 113: 163–175. Bibcode:1994MEPS..113..163I. doi:10.3354/meps113163. ISSN 0171-8630.

Trench, Robert K.; Blank, Rudolf J. (1987). "Symbiodinium Microadriaticum Freudenthal, S. Goreauii Sp. Nov., S. Kawagutii Sp. Nov. And S. Pilosum Sp. Nov.: Gymnodinioid Dinoflagellate Symbionts of Marine Invertebrates". Journal of Phycology. 23 (3): 469–481. Bibcode:1987JPcgy..23..469T. doi:10.1111/j.1529-8817.1987.tb02534.x. ISSN 0022-3646. S2CID 83712799.
