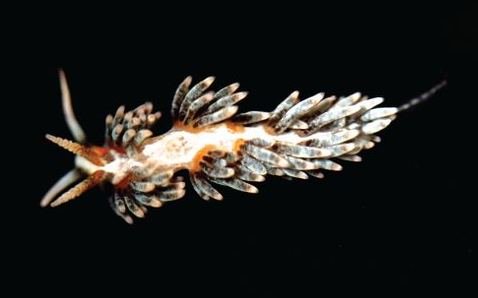
- Dorsal view of Berghia stephanieae.
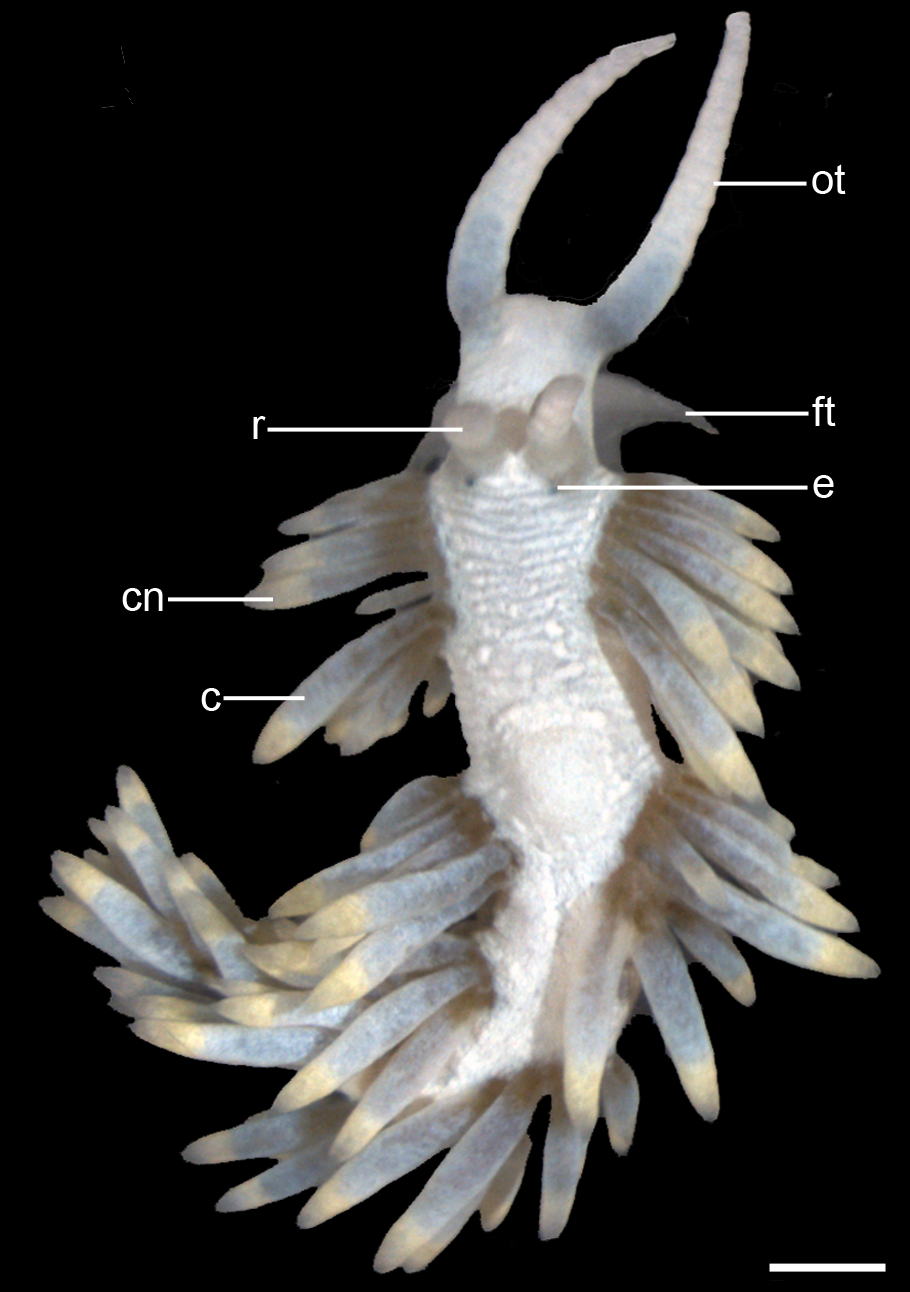
- Dorsal view of Berghia stephanieae. Scale bar is 100 μm.

Scientific classification
- Kingdom: Animalia
- Phylum: Mollusca
- Class: Gastropoda
- Order: Nudibranchia
- Suborder: Aeolidacea
- Family: Aeolidiidae
- Genus: Berghia
- Species: B. stephanieae

Binomial name
- Berghia stephanieae (Valdés, 2005)

= Berghia stephanieae =

Species of gastropod

Berghia stephanieae is a species of sea slug, an aeolid nudibranch. It is a marine gastropod mollusc in the family Aeolidiidae. It was previously known as Aeolidiella stephanieae.

== Distribution ==
The range of this species is from the most northern point 25.7°N, to the most southern 25.09°N, and from the most western 80.44°W, to the most eastern 80.2°W.

This is one of the most commonly sold aeolid nudibranchs in the marine aquarium trade in North America, because it is used to control the sea anemone Aiptasia.

== Description ==
The size of the body of this species is up to 20 mm.

== Ecology ==
This sea slug lives in shallow waters from 1 to 2 m in depth. It eats anemones from the genus Aiptasia.

=== Life cycle ===
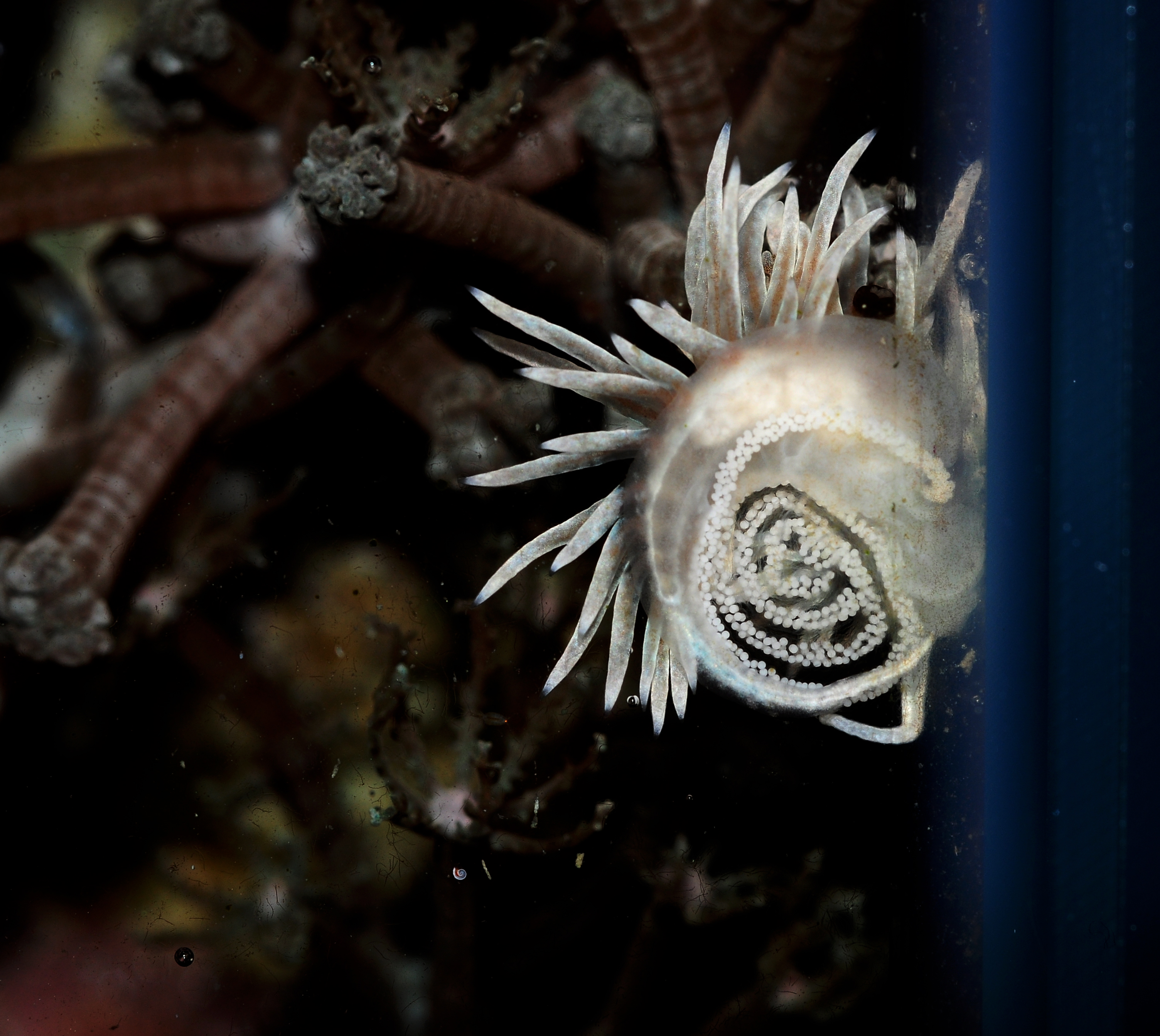
Berghia stephanieae laying eggs in an aquarium.

The development of Berghia stephanieae lasts 60 days at 22 °C. The ontogenetic development of Berghia stephanieae can be subdivided into 8 stages, each recognisable by characteristic morphological and behavioural features as well as specific characters of the nervous system and the muscular system, respectively. The larval nervous system of Berghia stephanieae includes an apical organ, developing central ganglia, and peripheral neurons associated with the velum (a structure used for swimming and particulate food collection), foot and posterior, visceral part of the larva.

In Berghia stephanieae the development is lecithotrophic (feed off a yolk sac). The first pair of cephalic tentacles, the rhinophores, emerge shortly after metamorphosis (30% of development), whereas the second pair, the oral tentacles, appear significantly later in postmetamorphic stages (juvenile stage, 40% of development). The same developmental pattern of cephalic tentacles has been shown in three other nudibranchs, so far (Adalaria proxima, Cadlina laevis and Melibe leonina). The settlement and metamorphosis in Berghia stephanieae larvae are not triggered by their future prey, and most likely therefore the rhinophores develop first after metamorphosis in order to be able to locate their diet, sea anemones.

==== Embryogenesis and larval development ====
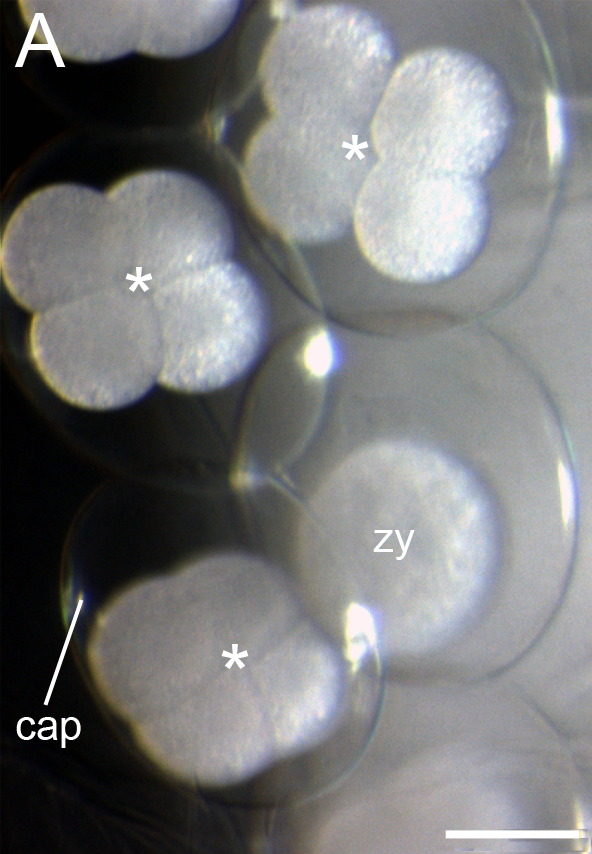
1= 2 h after oviposition (0% of development). Scale bar is 100 μm. zy = zygotes, * (asterisk) = four-celled embryos within the same egg mass, cap = the capsule that surrounds each embryo.

Typically the embryos of nudibranchs are enclosed by two membranes, the capsule that surrounds each embryo and another mucoid layer that encases all of the capsules in a gelatinous egg mass. After oviposition the first cleavages proceed quickly (at 1–2 hours after oviposition two-cell stage (0% of development) and at 8 hours after oviposition 16-cell stage (0.5% of development)). The divisions within an egg mass are asynchronous, both four-celled embryos and zygotes can be detected in the same egg mass.

==== Early veliger stage ====
The first detectable structures in the early veliger stage (5-10% of development), the larval shell and the ciliated velar lobes, appear at the same time as the first movements of the larvae (rotation around their anterior-posterior axes).

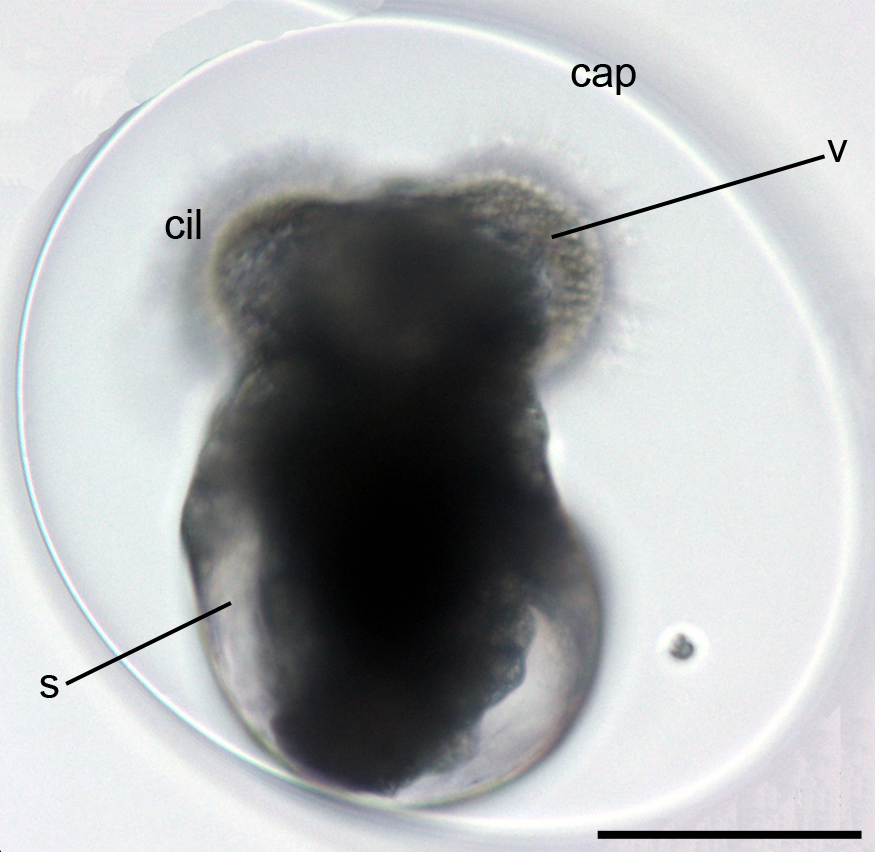
Dorsal view of an early veliger stage larva (5% of development). Scale bar is 100 μm. s = shell, v = ciliated velum, cil = cilia, cap = the capsule that surrounds each embryo.

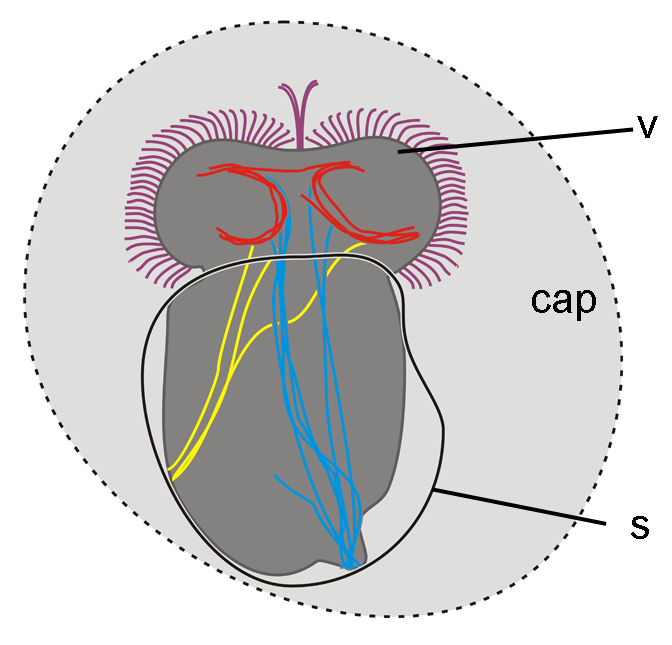
Drawing of a dorsal view of an early veliger stage larva (5% of development) showing first fibres of larval muscles: (purple) v = cilia of apical tuft and velum; (cornflower blue) the larval retractor muscle, (yellow) the accessory retractor muscle, (red) the velar ring muscles, s = shell, cap = the capsule that surrounds each embryo. The total size is about 170 μm.

==== Veliger stage ====
Veliger stage (10-20% of development): The embryo can retract the velum into the shell and the eyes as well as the larval foot (propodium) appear.

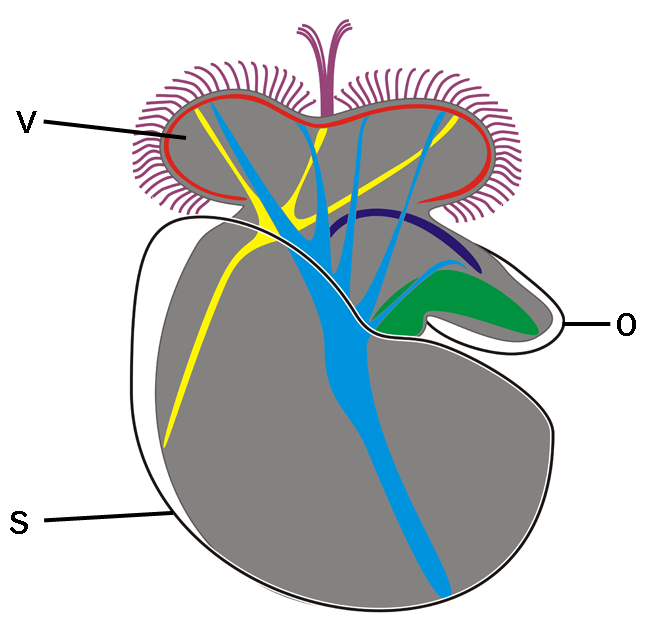
Drawing of lateral view of veliger stage larva (10% of development) with well-developed accessory, larval, pedal (blue), and a metapodial (green) retractor muscle. The total size is about 170 μm.: (purple) v = cilia of apical tuft and velum; (cornflower blue) the larval retractor muscle, (yellow) the accessory retractor muscle, (red) the velar ring muscles, (dark blue) pedal retractor muscle, (green) metapodial retractor muscle, o = operculum, s = shell.

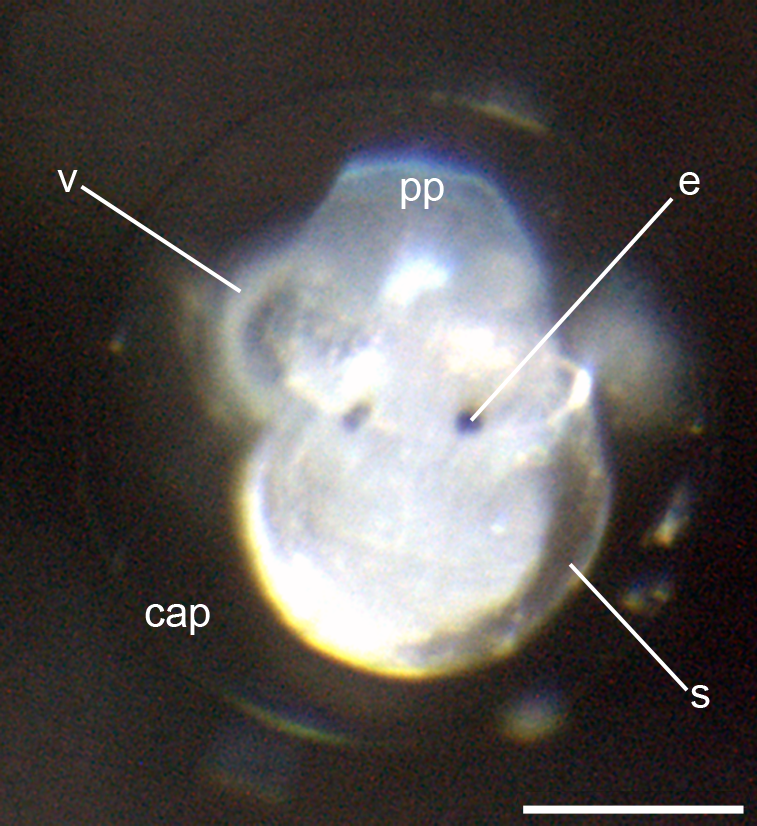
Dorsal view of veliger stage larva (12% of development). Scale bar is 100 μm. e = eyes, pp = elaborated larval foot (propodium), s = shell, v = ciliated velum, cap = the capsule that surrounds each embryo.

==== Late veliger stage and metamorphosis ====
Late veliger stage (20-25% of development): The operculum is present and the foot becomes thicker and longer, the embryo hatches shortly prior to metamorphosis. Swimming is accomplished by ciliary beats of the velar cilia.

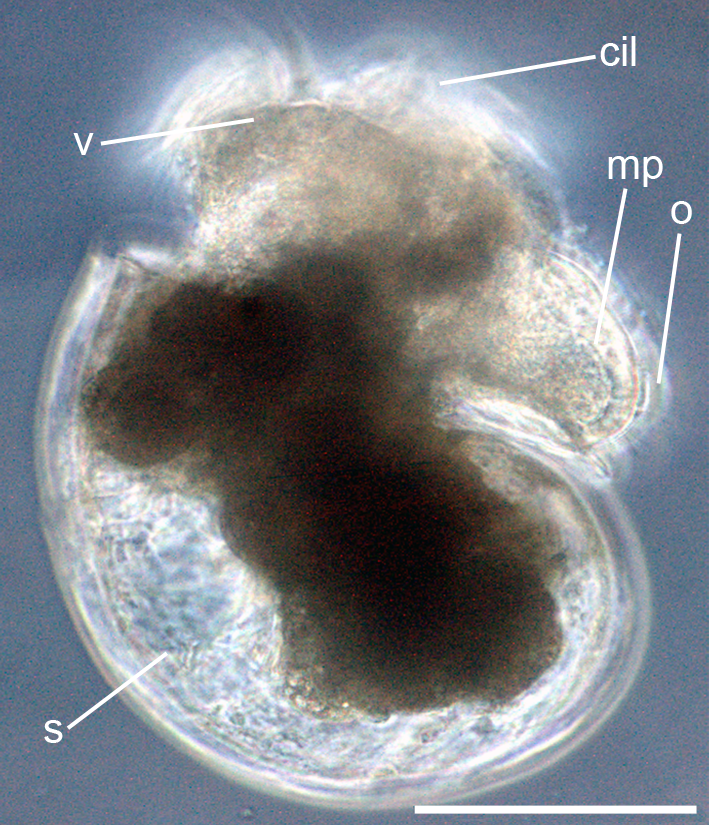
Lateral view of hatched larva (20% of development). Scale bar is 100 μm. o = operculum, mp = metapodium to where is the operculum attached at, cil = cilia, s = shell, v = ciliated velum.

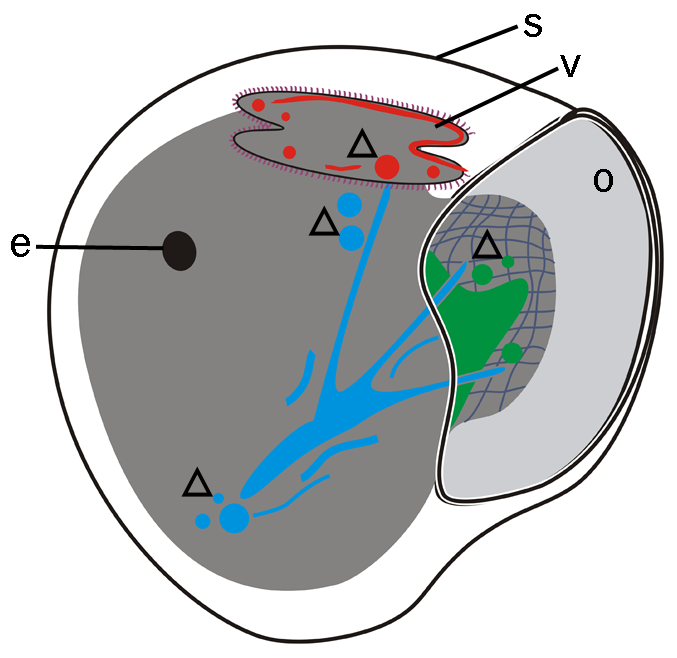
Drawing of lateral view of into the shell retracted metamorphic larva (25% of development) showing: $\triangle$ - (open triangles) degenerating velar lobes and muscles, (purple) v = cilia of apical tuft and velum; (cornflower blue) the larval retractor muscle, (red) the velar ring muscles, (dark blue) pedal retractor muscle, (green) metapodial retractor muscle, e = eye, o = operculum, s = shell. The total size is about 120 μm.

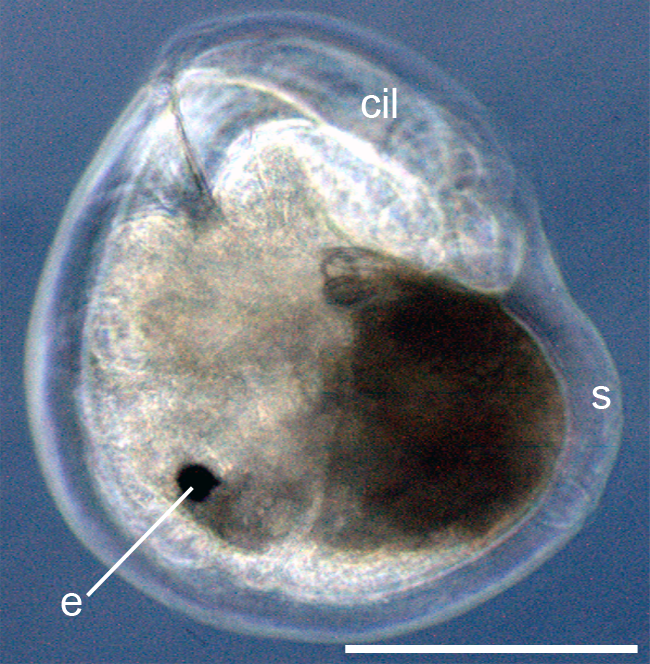
Lateral view of retracted and settled larva in metamorphosis (25% of development). Scale bar is 100 μm. e = eyes, cil = cilia, s = shell.

Metamorphosis (25-30% of development): Usually one day after hatching the larvae settle on the bottom and retract into the larval shell. During the process of metamorphosis, which does not take longer than 48 hours, the animals cast off their larval shell.

==== Early juvenile stage ====
Early juvenile stage (30-40% of development): Slightly after metamorphosis the early juveniles start to crawl on the bottom, which also marks the beginning of the benthic lifestyle.

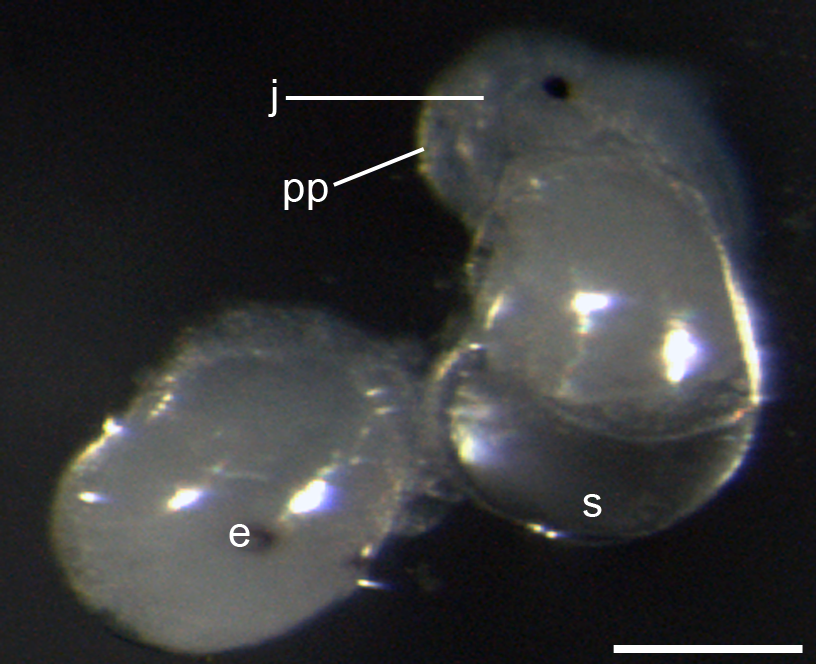
Dorsal view of an early juvenile stage (30% of development). Scale bar is 100 μm. j = juvenile of Berghia stephanieae is crawling out of the shell and marking the end of the metamorphosis. pp = elaborated larval foot (propodium), e = eyes, s = shell.

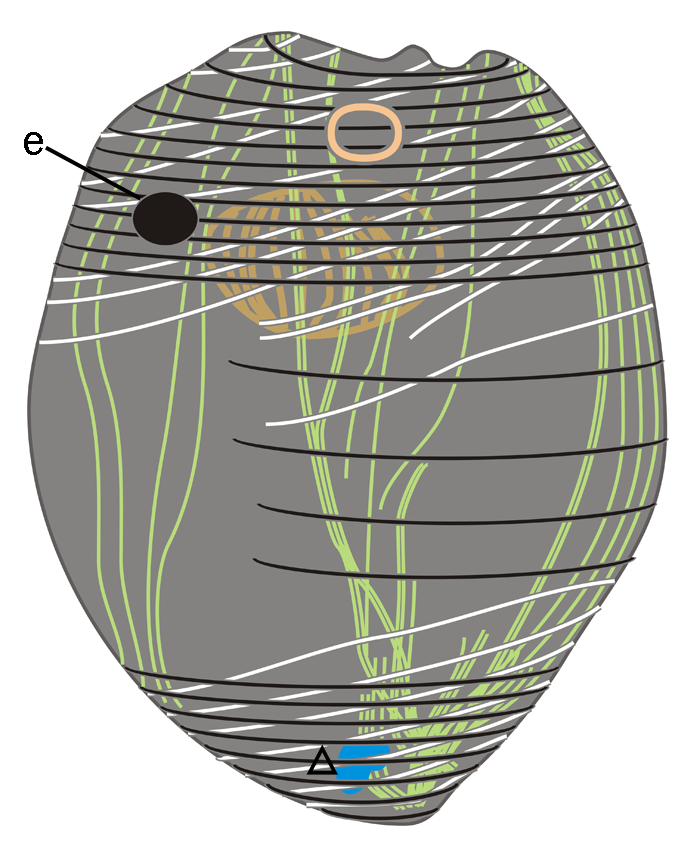
Drawing of lateral view of early juvenile stage closely after metamorphosis (30% of development) showing the body wall musculature comprises muscle fibres: (light green) longitudinal muscle fibers, (black) circular muscle fibers, (white) oblique muscle fibres, (brown) anlage of the buccal musculature, (apricot color) mouth, (cornflower blue) the larval retractor muscle, $\triangle$ - (open triangle) larval retractor muscle is still degenerating, e = eye. The total size is about 200 μm.

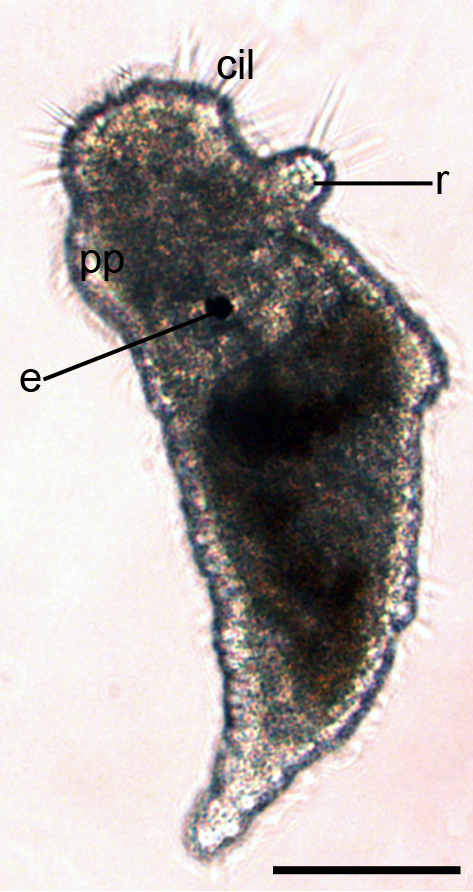
Lateral view of an early vermiform juvenile stage (35% of development). Scale bar is 100 μm. r = anlage of the rhinophores, cil = cilia. The body is covered by cilia. e = eye, pp = propodium.

The eyes indicate the anterior part of the white elongated animals. 24 hours after metamorphosis they crawl at the bottom of the culture dish without feeding. At the same time rhinophore rudiments appear anterior to the eyes as the first pair of cephalic tentacles. Ciliation of the early juveniles is detectable all over the body. At the anterior end and on the tip of the rhinophore rudiments there are cirri, which are compound sensory cilia. Generally, 48 hours after metamorphosis juvenile specimens of Berghia stephanieae start to prey upon pieces of Aiptasia pallida anemones.

==== Juvenile stage ====
Juvenile stage (40-60% of development): At this stage the rudiments of oral tentacles (2nd pair of cephalic tentacles) and the paired, dorsal cerata appear.

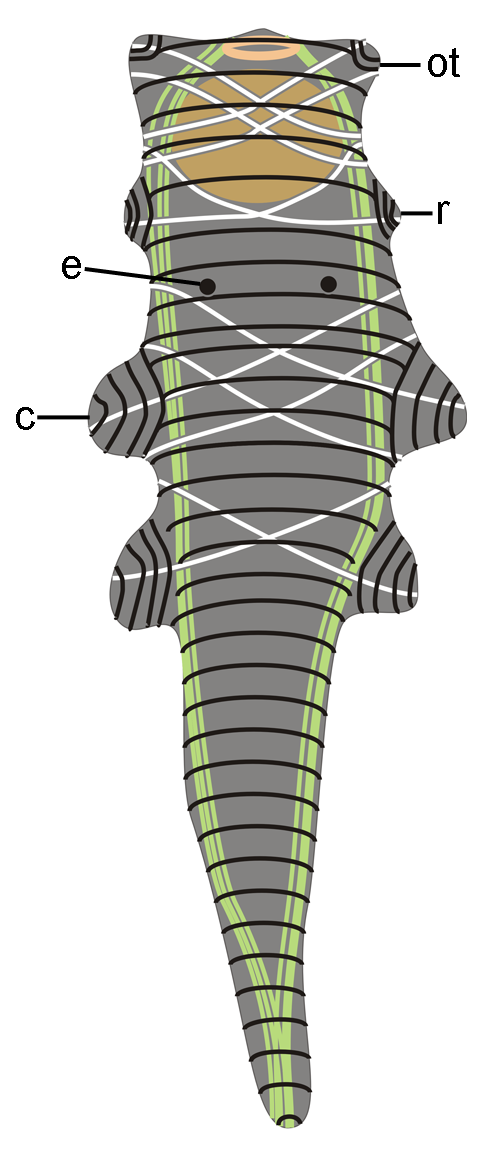
Drawing of dorsal view of juvenile (40% of development): (light green) longitudinal muscle fibers, (black) circular muscle fibers, (white) oblique muscle fibres, (brown) anlage of the buccal musculature, (apricot color) mouth, ot = the anlage of oral tentacles, r = rhinophores, c = the first cerata pairs, e = eye. The total size is about 600 μm.

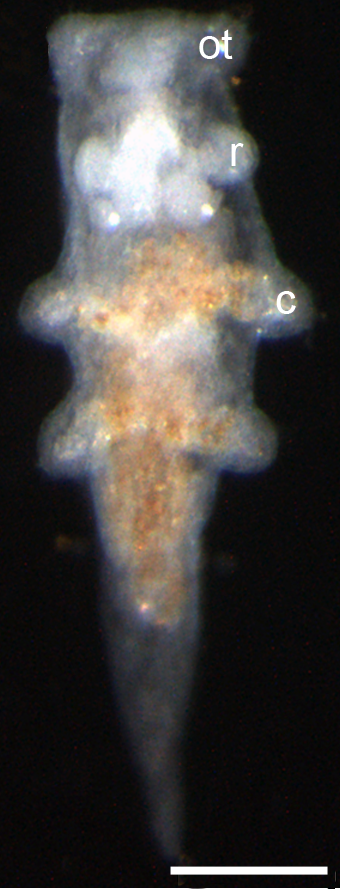
Dorsal view of 26 days after oviposition (43% of development). Scale bar is 100 μm. ot = oral tentacles, r = rhinophores, c = anlagen of the first cerata.

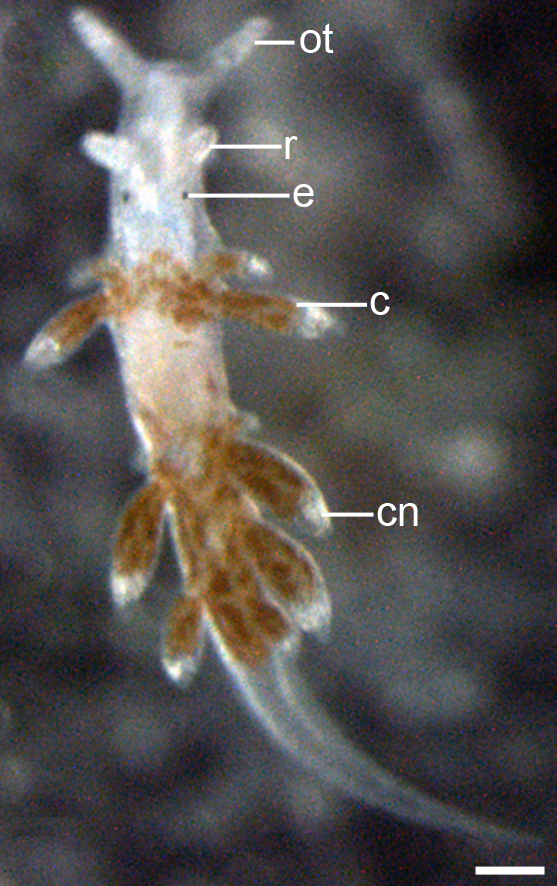
Dorsal view of 30 days old juvenile (50% of development). Scale bar is 100 μm. cn =cnidosacs at the cerata tips. Note that the rhinophores as well as oral tentacles are longer and thicker now. ot = oral tentacles, r = rhinophores, e = eye, c = cerata.

The size of the body increases one third in contrast to the previous developmental stage. As the development continues, the length and the thickness of the rhinophores and oral tentacles increases as well as the body size. At this stage additional pairs of cerata appear and on their tip the filled cnidosacs can be detected for the first time.

==== Late juvenile stage ====
As development proceeds, body elongation increases and more pairs of cerata as well as some tentacle-like elongation of the propodium appears.

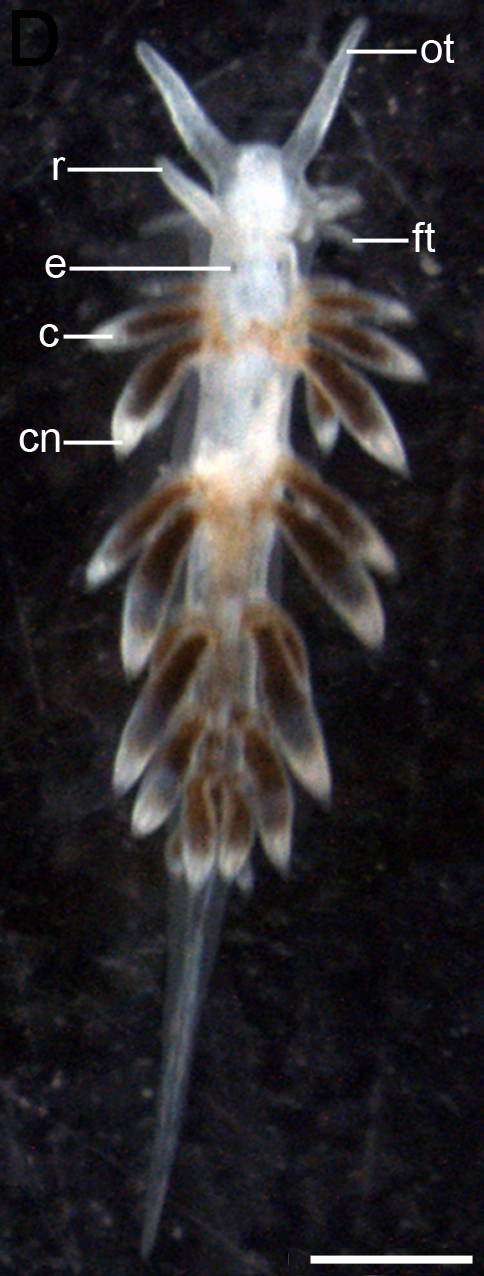
Dorsal view of 39 days after oviposition (65% of development). Scale bar is 100 μm. ft = foot tentacles A tentacle-like elongation of the propodium, appear. Note that the oral tentacles are almost twice as long as the rhinophores and the additional pairs of cerata. ot = oral tentacles, r = rhinophores, e = eye, c = cerata. cn =cnidosacs at the cerata tips.

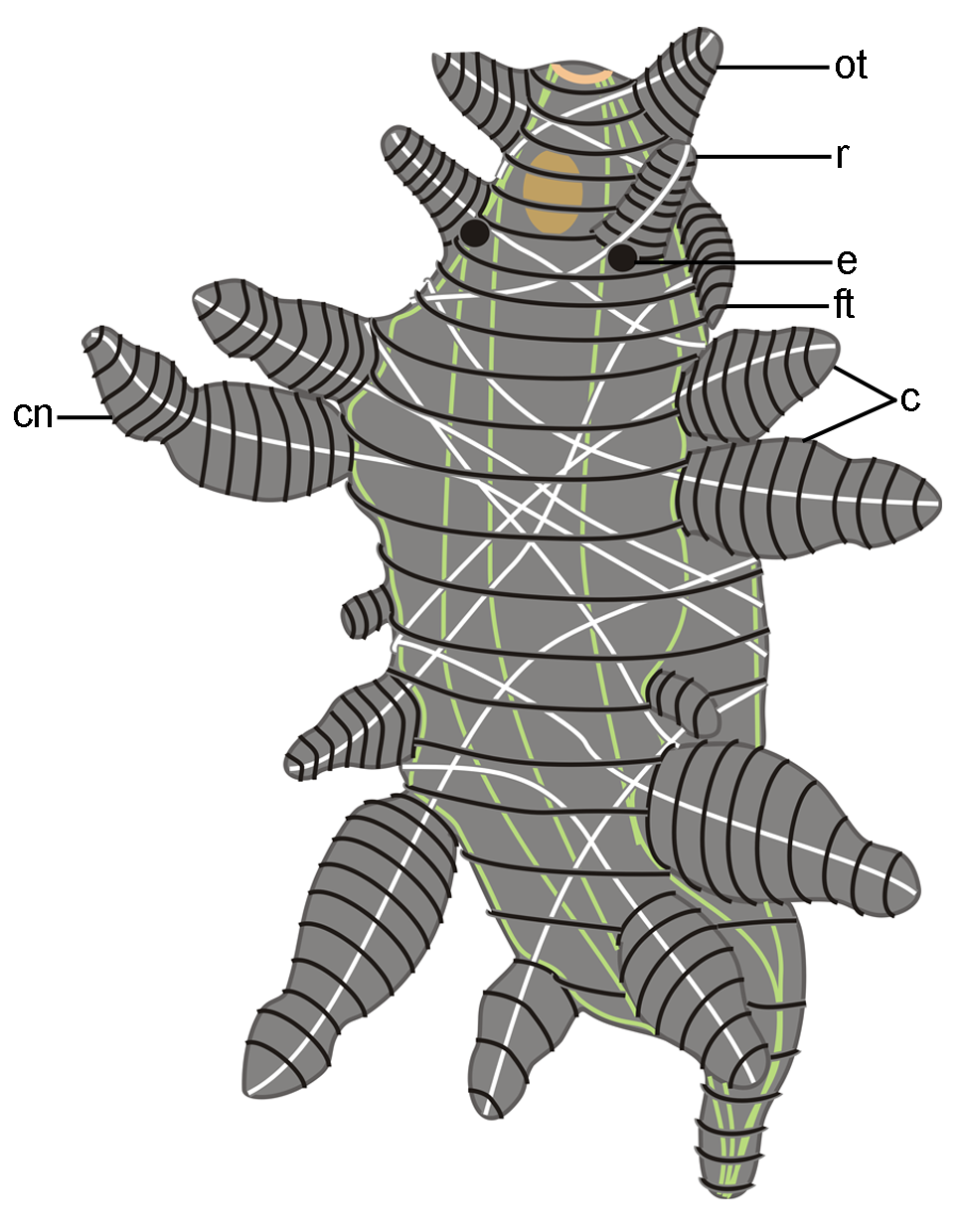
Drawing of dorsal view of late juvenile (65% of development) showing the meshwork of outer circular, intermediate oblique, and inner longitudinal body wall muscle fibres as well as growing tentacles and the cerata with cnidosacs. The total size is about 1400 μm.: (light green) longitudinal muscle fibers, (black) circular muscle fibers, (white) oblique muscle fibres, (brown) anlage of the buccal musculature, (apricot color) mouth, cn = cnidosacs, ft = foot tentacle, a tentacle-like elongation of the propodium, ot = the anlage of oral tentacles, r = rhinophores, c = the first cerata pairs, e = eye.

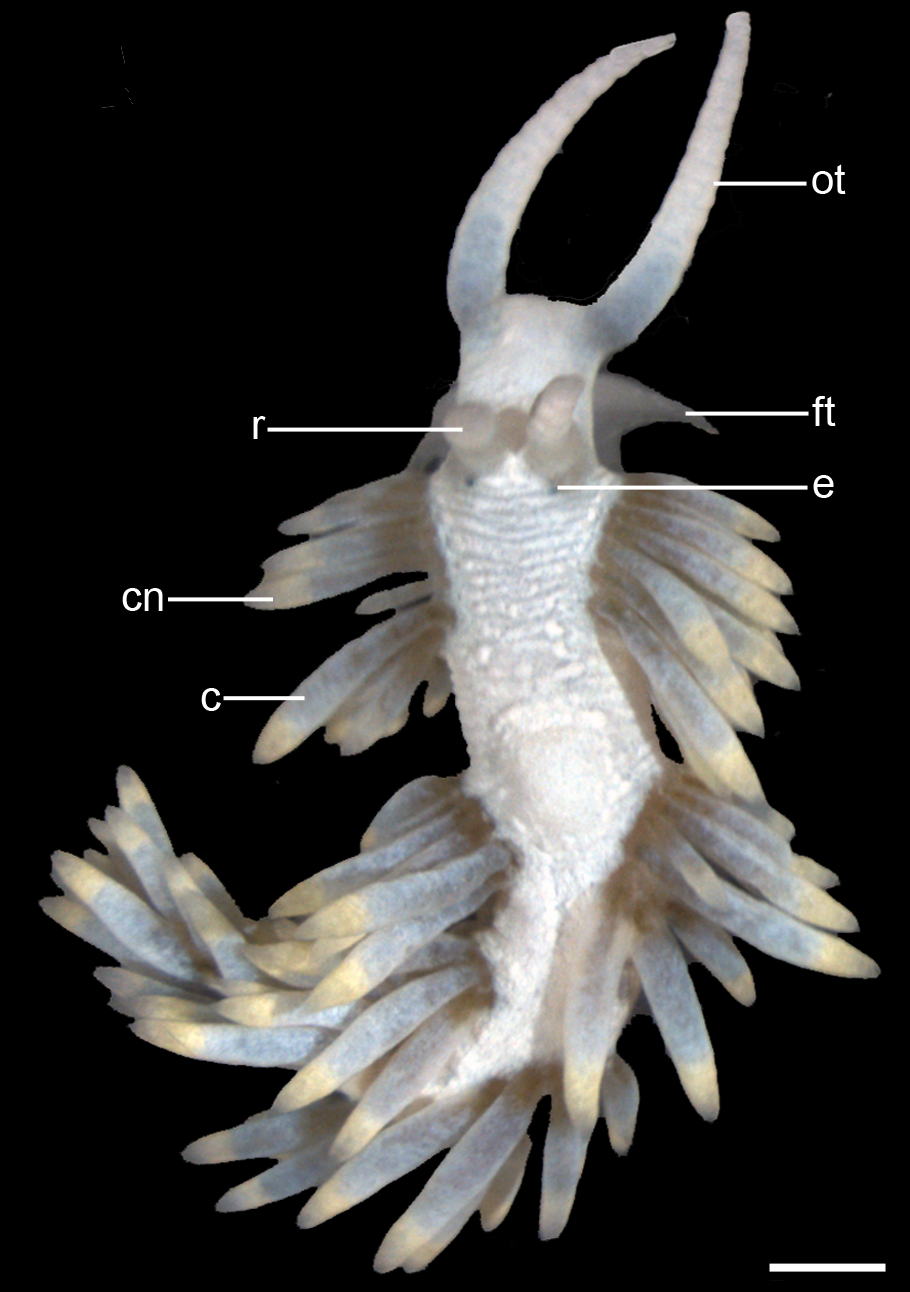
Dorsal view of morphology of mature Aeolidiella stephanieae (100% of development). Scale bar is 100 μm. ot = oral tentacles, ft = foot tentacles, e = eye, r = rhinophores, cn =cnidosacs at the cerata tips, c = cerata.

==== Mature stage ====
At the mature stage of Berghia stephanieae, the body size is between 0.8–1 cm, which is ten times bigger than in the previous developmental stage, and the oral tentacles are twice as long as the rhinophores. Reproductive maturity is reached 60 days after oviposition (100% of development). The first egg masses are small and contain 60 to 80 embryos. Mature individuals reach a maximum size of 5 cm, and their egg masses contain 1000 to 2000 embryos.

==== Central nervous system and periphery ====
The neurogenesis of Berghia stephanieae is similar to that of other nudibranchs. The larval nervous system of Berghia stephanieae includes an apical organ, developing central ganglia, and peripheral neurons associated with the velum, foot and posterior part of the larvae. The first neurons containing serotonin and FMRFamide are observed during the early veliger stage (5-10% of development) in the apical organ. Slightly later, in the veliger stage (15% of development), peripheral FMRFamidergic cells appear in the posterior part of the larvae, and persist throughout metamorphosis into the early juvenile stage (30% of development). In other gastropods, these neurons have never been documented to persist during metamorphosis. As in many other gastropods, the ganglia of Berghia stephanieae develop from an anterior to posterior direction in both expression patterns, serotonergic and FMRFamidergic, where the cerebral ganglia develop first followed by the pedal-, and the posterior ganglia. As in other nudibranchs described, the central nervous system of Berghia stephanieae becomes more concentrated during metamorphosis. In the newly metamorphosed Berghia stephanieae rhinophoral ganglia appear as additional neural structures at the same time as the rhinophores start to grow.

==== Myogenesis ====
Berghia stephanieae has a larval retractor muscle and also the accessory larval retractor muscle is present. As in other nudibranchs the post-metamorphic myo-anatomy in Berghia stephanieae is formed de novo. However, regardless the number, larval retractor muscles make no contribution to the post-metamorphic columellar muscle in opisthobranchs.

=== In the aquarium ===
Berghia stephanieae is considered one of the best predators for Aiptasia sp., sea anemones that are usually considered pests in the marine aquarium hobby, because they are stressful to coral around them, and occasionally even sting fish and desirable invertebrates. Because Berghia stephanieae only eat Aiptasias, the nudibranchs will die of starvation when all the anemones are gone, so this situation must be taken into account. Prior to the description of Berghia stephanieae in 2005, that species from the aquaria have been called as "Berghia verrucicornis".

== Behavior ==
Berghia stephanieae exhibits a distinctive defensive behavior known as "bristling." This rapid and dramatic response involves the coordinated movement of cerata, which are venomous appendages protruding from the animal's mantle. The bristling behavior occurs in two stages:

1. Initial adduction of proximate cerata to sting the perceived threat
2. Coordinated radial extension of remaining cerata, forming a protective, pincushion-like screen around the animal

Studies on decerebrated specimens have shown that while the first stage of bristling remains intact, the second stage is replaced by slower, uncoordinated ceratal movements. This suggests that the bristling behavior is stereotyped but non-reflexive, with the cerebral ganglia playing a crucial role in coordinating the full defensive response.

== Genome Sequencing ==
Nudibranch-specific structures like rhinophores and aeolid-specific structures like the cerata make Berghia stephanieae an interesting model for the study of the genetic basis of new tissues. The B. stephanieae genome was sequenced in 2024, and several clade-specific genes found only in nudibranchs or only in aeolids were identified. However, RNA sequencing of specific tissues found that novel tissues like rhinophores and cerata did not have a higher number or proportion of clade-specific genes expressed.
