= Berghia marinae =

Scientific classification
- Kingdom: Animalia
- Phylum: Mollusca
- Class: Gastropoda
- Order: Nudibranchia
- Suborder: Aeolidacea
- Family: Aeolidiidae
- Genus: Berghia
- Species: B. marinae

Binomial name
- Berghia marinae Carmona, Pola, Gosliner & Cervera, 2014

Species of gastropod

Berghia marinae is a species of sea slugs, an aeolid nudibranch. It is a shell-less marine gastropod mollusc in the family Aeolidiidae.

== Distribution ==
This species was described from the Tacoma wreck dive site, in Senegal.
