= Aiptasia diaphana =

Conservation status
- Least Concern (IUCN 3.1) (Mediterranean)

Scientific classification
- Kingdom: Animalia
- Phylum: Cnidaria
- Subphylum: Anthozoa
- Class: Hexacorallia
- Order: Actiniaria
- Family: Aiptasiidae
- Genus: Aiptasia
- Species: A. diaphana

Binomial name
- Aiptasia diaphana (Rapp, 1829)

Synonyms
- Actinia diaphana Rapp, 1829; Adamsia diaphana; Aiptasia saxicola Andrès, 1881; Aiptasiomorpha diaphana (Rapp, 1829); Cribrina diaphana (Rapp, 1829)

Species of sea anemone

Aiptasia diaphana, commonly known as the yellow aiptasia or glasrose, is a species of sea anemone native to shallow waters in the temperate eastern Atlantic Ocean and the Mediterranean Sea. It has been introduced into the Red Sea.

== Description ==
Aiptasia diaphana is a small sea anemone with a base diameter of up to 30 mm (1.2 in), a column height of up to 50 mm (2.0 in) and an oral disc of 30 mm (1.2 in). The column is yellowish-brown or brownish-green, smooth and retractable. The colour is somewhat variable because symbiotic algae (zooxanthellae) are sometimes present in the tissues. The oral disc is transparent and bears, round the rim, four or five whorls of slender, pointed tentacles making a total of up to 160 tentacles. These are translucent with white bases, a distinguishing feature of this species.

== Distribution and habitat ==
Aiptasia diaphana is native to the Atlantic coast of Portugal, the Canary Islands and throughout the Mediterranean Sea and has been introduced to the Red Sea. It is found on hard surfaces at depths down to about 10 m (33 ft) and favours areas with poor water quality such as harbours and lagoons. It is often found at high densities.

== Biology ==
Aiptasia diaphana catches passing invertebrates, marine larvae and small fish with its tentacles, immobilising the prey with its cnidocytes (stinging cells). It also obtains nourishment from the zooxanthellae in its tissues. These photosynthetic algae manufacture carbohydrates in sunlight and these nutrients are available to the sea anemone.

Aiptasia diaphana reproduces by both sexual and asexual reproduction and does so under different conditions. In the summer the main method is pedal laceration; the sea anemone crawls along the substrate and fragments of the base become detached, each fragment growing into a new individual, a clone of the parent. Under laboratory conditions, an adult female can produce males, females and hermaphrodite individuals in this way.
