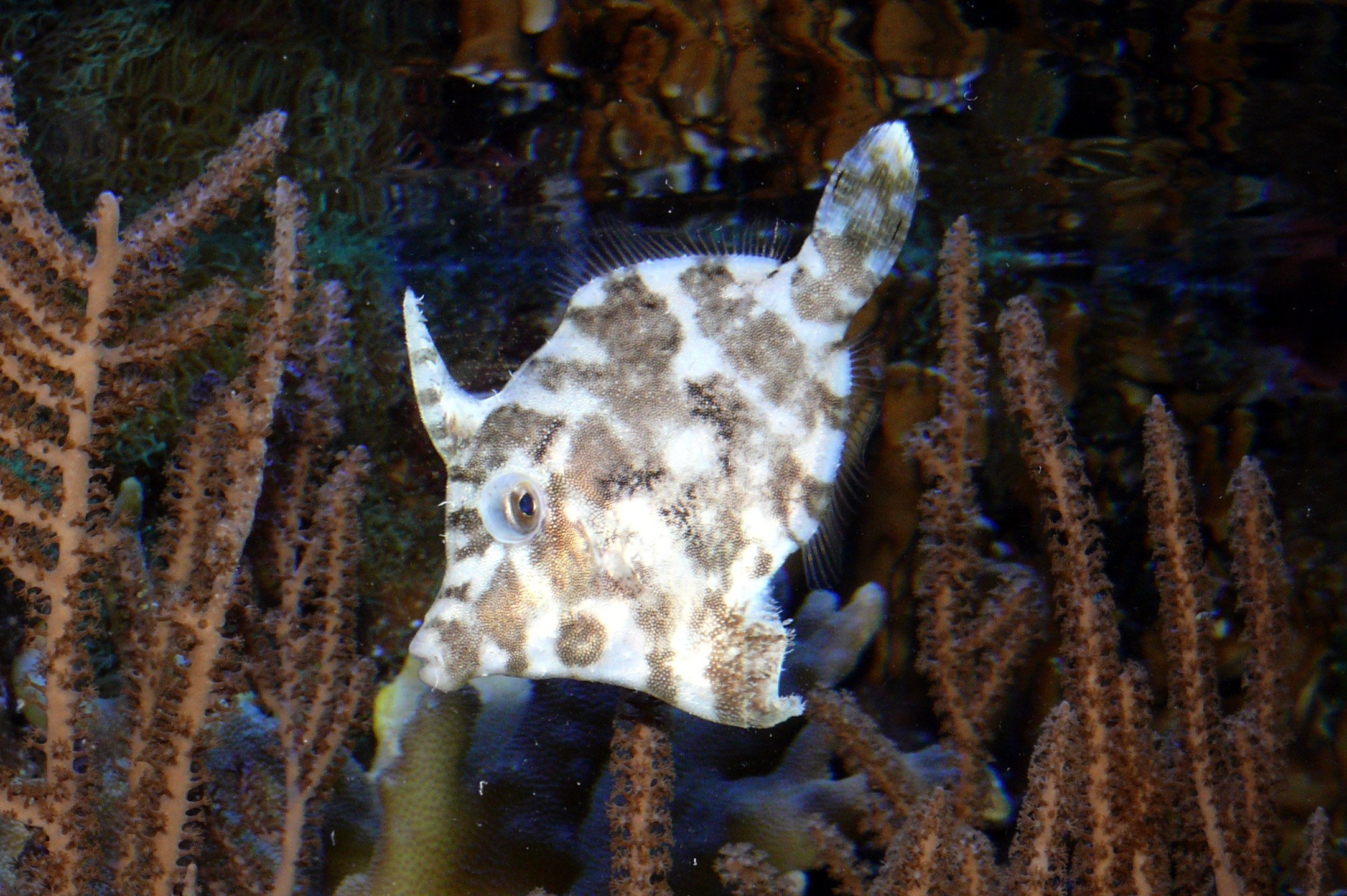
- Acreichthys tomentosus

Scientific classification
- Kingdom: Animalia
- Phylum: Chordata
- Class: Actinopterygii
- Order: Tetraodontiformes
- Family: Monacanthidae
- Genus: Acreichthys; Fraser-Brunner, 1941

= Acreichthys =

Genus of fishes

Acreichthys is a genus of filefishes native to the Indian and Pacific Oceans.

== Species ==
There are currently 3 recognized species in this genus:

Species	Common name	Image
Acreichthys hajam Bleeker, 1851		
Acreichthys radiatus Popta, 1900	Radial leatherjacket	
Acreichthys tomentosus Linnaeus, 1758	Bristle-tail filefish	
