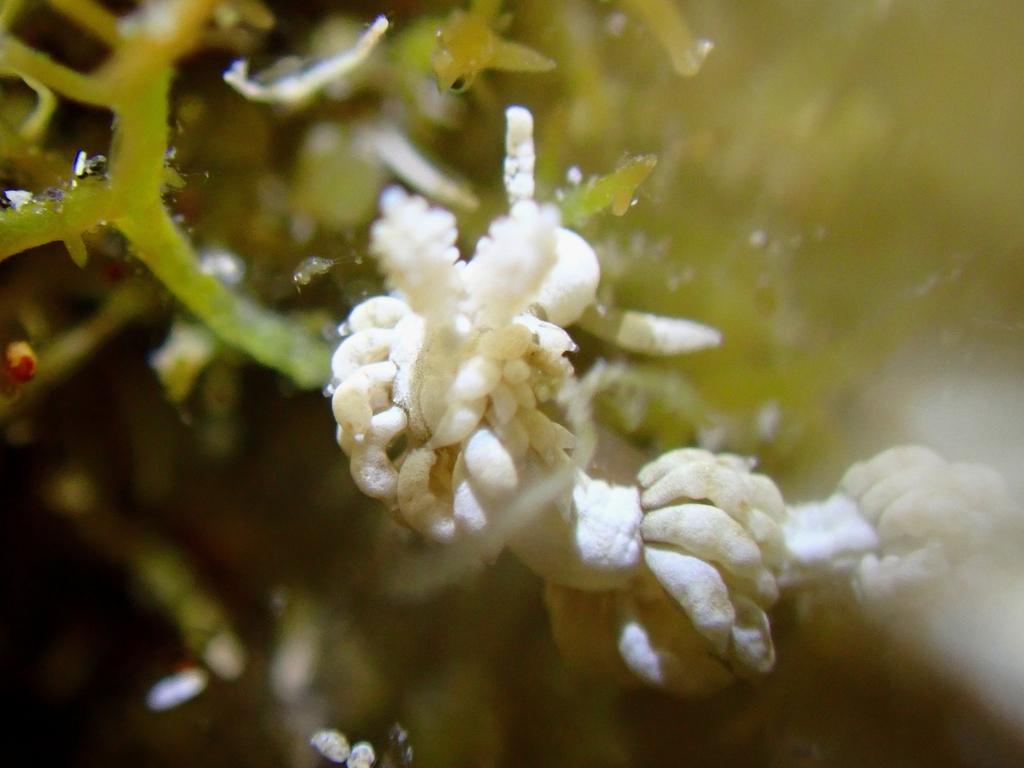

Scientific classification
- Kingdom: Animalia
- Phylum: Mollusca
- Class: Gastropoda
- Order: Nudibranchia
- Suborder: Aeolidacea
- Family: Aeolidiidae
- Genus: Berghia
- Species: B. creutzbergi

Binomial name
- Berghia creutzbergi Er. Marcus & Ev. Marcus, 1970

Synonyms
- Spurilla creutzbergi (Er. Marcus & Ev. Marcus, 1970); Milleria ritmica Ortea, Caballer & Espinosa, 2003; Millereolidia ritmica (Ortea, Caballer & Espinosa, 2003)

= Berghia creutzbergi =

Species of gastropod

Berghia creutzbergi is a species of sea slug, an aeolid nudibranch. It is a shell-less marine gastropod mollusc in the family Aeolidiidae.

== Distribution ==
This species is an inhabitant of the Tropical Western Atlantic Ocean present in Brazil, Curaçao, Venezuela, Barbados, Bahamas, the Cayman Islands, the Caribbean coast of Costa Rica, Cuba and Florida.

== Description ==
Berghia creutzbergi has a maximum reported size of 30 mm.

== Habitat ==
This species is found in depths from 0 to 5 m.
