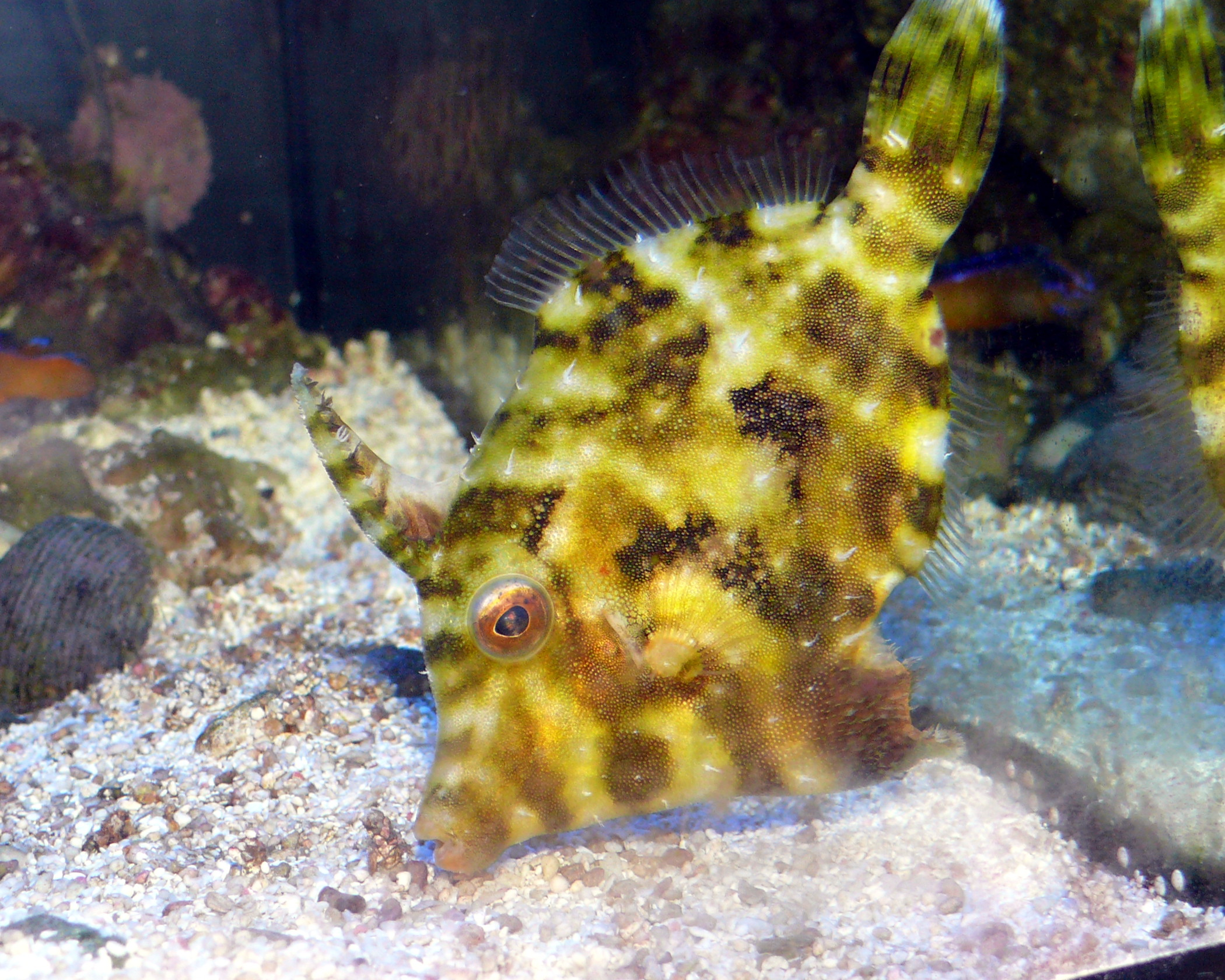

Conservation status
- Least Concern (IUCN 3.1)

Scientific classification
- Kingdom: Animalia
- Phylum: Chordata
- Class: Actinopterygii
- Division: Teleostei
- Order: Tetraodontiformes
- Family: Monacanthidae
- Genus: Acreichthys
- Species: A. tomentosus

Binomial name
- Acreichthys tomentosus (Linnaeus, 1758)

= Acreichthys tomentosus =

Species of fish

Acreichthys tomentosus, commonly known as the bristle-tail filefish or Aiptasia-eating filefish, is a species of demersal marine fish which belongs to the family Monacanthidae and is widespread throughout the tropical waters of the Indo-west Pacific. It is a small fish that can reach a maximum size of 12 cm (4.7 in) length and has the ability to rapidly change color and skin texture and patterns as to avoid detection and consequently predation. It is oviparous.

== Description ==
On average, it ranges from 3.8 to 8.9 cm (1.5 to 3.5 in) in length. It has 27-30 anal spines and 26-29 anal soft rays.

== Distribution and Ecology ==
It is found in the waters around Sri Lanka, Ishigaki island, the Philippines, Indonesia, New Guinea, Queensland, New Caledonia, and Tonga. It inhabits shallow coral reefs, preferring sections of the reef which contain seagrass. It prefers temperatures of 27.6–29 °C (81.7–84.2 °F), a dissolved oxygen concentration of 4.51-4.59 mL/L (4510-4590 ppm), and a depth of 2–15 m (6.6–49.2 ft).

=== Diet ===
It feeds on amphipods, polychaetes, and molluscs.

=== Human Interaction ===
It is commonly kept in aquaria as a member of the clean-up crew for its willingness to eat Aiptasia anemones, a common aquarium pest.
