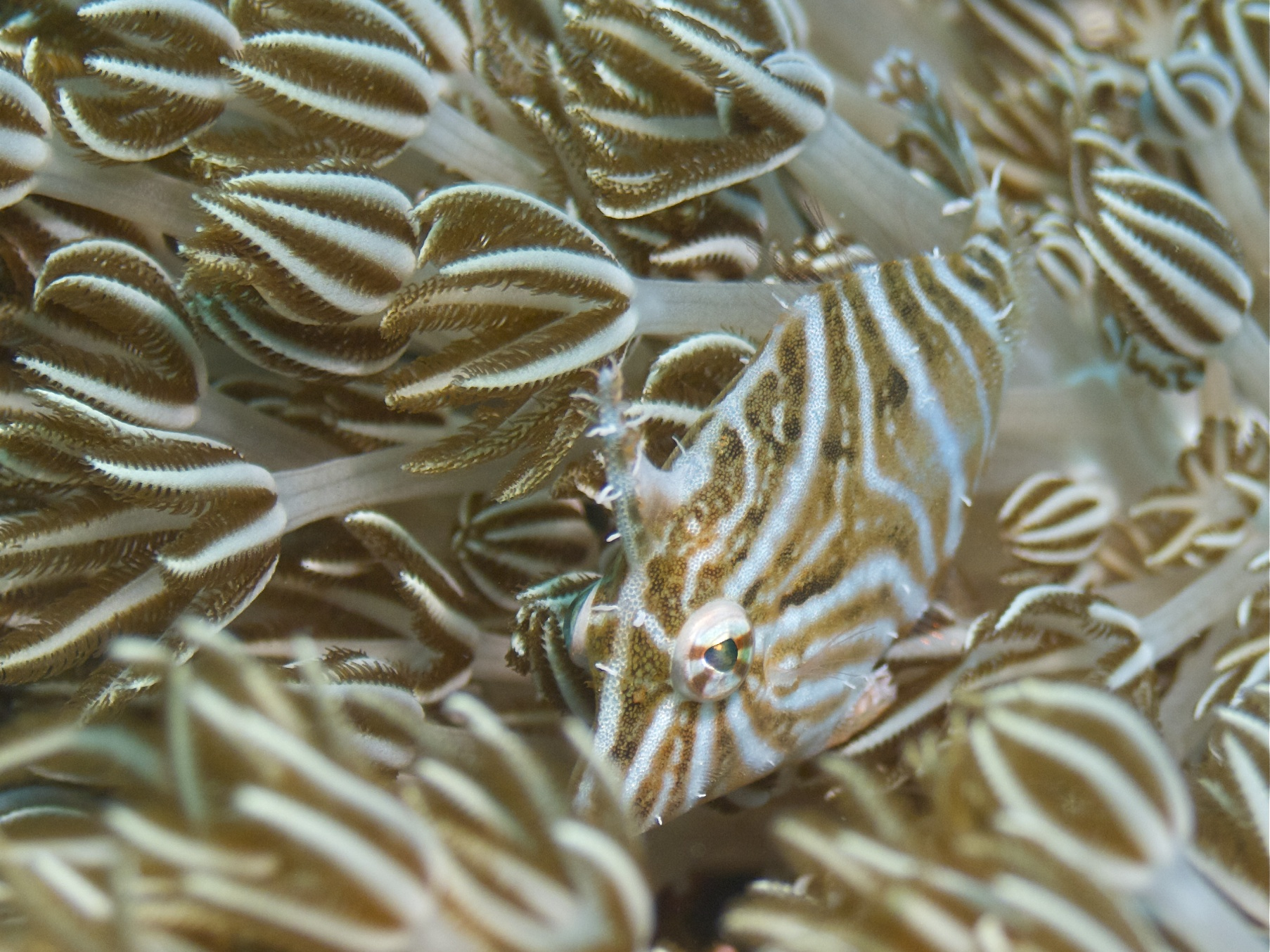

Conservation status
- Least Concern (IUCN 3.1)

Scientific classification
- Kingdom: Animalia
- Phylum: Chordata
- Class: Actinopterygii
- Division: Teleostei
- Order: Tetraodontiformes
- Family: Monacanthidae
- Genus: Acreichthys
- Species: A. radiatus

Binomial name
- Acreichthys radiatus (Popta, 1900)

= Acreichthys radiatus =

Species of fish

Acreichthys radiatus, commonly known as the radial filefish or the radial leatherjacket, is a species of demersal marine fish which belongs to the family Monacanthidae widespread throughout the tropical waters of the western Pacific Ocean, including the Ryukyu Islands, the Philippines, the oriental part of Indonesia, Papua New Guinea, the north east area of Australia, and New Caledonia. It is a small size fish that can reach a maximum size of 7 centimeters (2.7 inches) in length.

== Description ==
On average, a mature male ranges from 2.2 to 4.9 centimeters (0.9–1.9 inches) in length, while a mature female is 2.1–3.4 centimeters (0.8–1.3 inches) long. It has two dorsal spines, 26–29 soft rays, and 25–27 anal soft rays. The males develop bristles on their caudal peduncles when they reach sexual maturity.

== Ecology ==
This species occurs in coral reefs at depths of 2–12 m (6.6–39.4 ft). It is usually found among soft corals and is believed to feed off of both the coral polyps and the coral tissue. To survive, it needs water temperatures of 28.1–28.7 °C (82.6–83.7 °F) and dissolved oxygen concentration of 4.45–4.47 mL/L (4450-4470 ppm).
