= Berghia agari =

Scientific classification
- Kingdom: Animalia
- Phylum: Mollusca
- Class: Gastropoda
- Order: Nudibranchia
- Suborder: Aeolidacea
- Family: Aeolidiidae
- Genus: Berghia
- Species: B. agari

Binomial name
- Berghia agari (Smallwood, 1910)

Synonyms
- Facelina agari Smallwood, 1910 (original combination); Millereolidia agari (Smallwood, 1910)

Species of gastropod

Berghia agari is a species of sea slug, an aeolid nudibranch. It is a shell-less marine gastropod mollusc in the family Aeolidiidae.

== Distribution ==
This species has been seen in Bermuda, but it has been reported from Guadeloupe.
