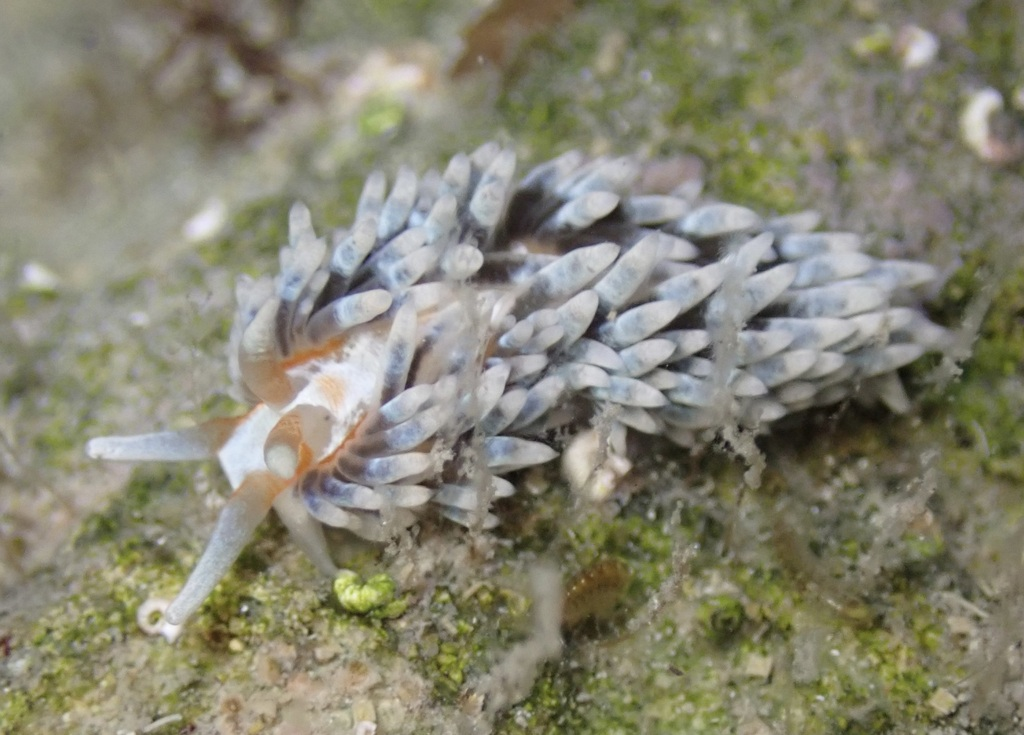

Scientific classification
- Kingdom: Animalia
- Phylum: Mollusca
- Class: Gastropoda
- Order: Nudibranchia
- Suborder: Aeolidacea
- Family: Aeolidiidae
- Genus: Berghia
- Species: B. rissodominguezi

Binomial name
- Berghia rissodominguezi Muniain & Ortea, 1999

= Berghia rissodominguezi =

Species of gastropod

Berghia rissodominguezi is a species of sea slug, an aeolid nudibranch. It is a shell-less marine gastropod mollusc in the family Aeolidiidae.

== Distribution ==
Originally described from Argentina, this species has also been recorded from the Brazilian and Caribbean coasts. It is also found off the coast of the United States.

== Description ==
The maximum recorded length is 52 mm.
