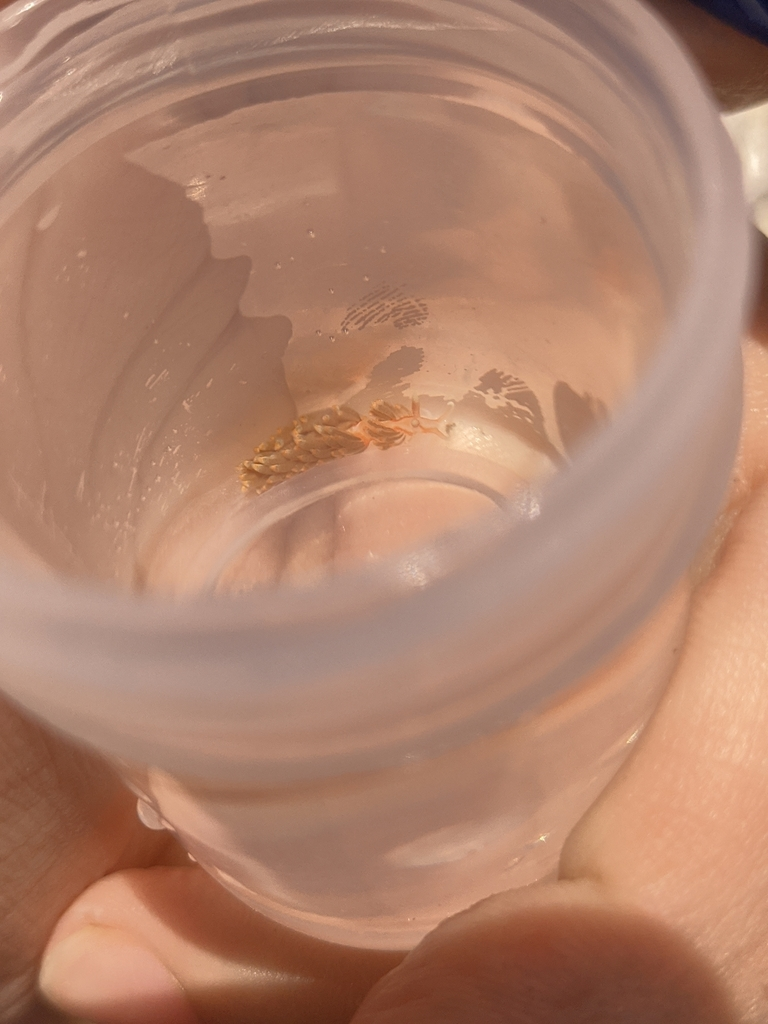

Scientific classification
- Kingdom: Animalia
- Phylum: Mollusca
- Class: Gastropoda
- Order: Nudibranchia
- Suborder: Aeolidacea
- Family: Aeolidiidae
- Genus: Berghia
- Species: B. columbina

Binomial name
- Berghia columbina (Garcia-Gomez & Thompson, 1990)

= Berghia columbina =

Species of gastropod

Berghia columbina is a species of sea slug, an aeolid nudibranch. It is a shell-less marine gastropod mollusc in the family Aeolidiidae.

== Distribution ==
Originally described from the southwestern coast of the Iberian Peninsula, Atlantic Ocean. This species has been reported from the Mediterranean coast of Andalusia, southern Spain, southern Portugal the Canary Islands, Senegal and the Atlantic coast of Morocco.
