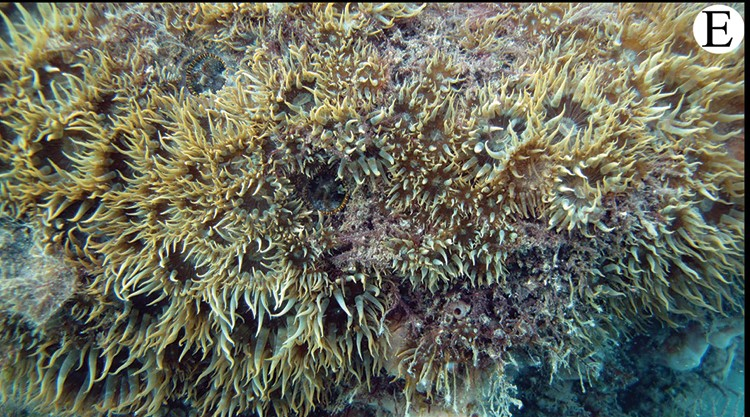

Scientific classification
- Kingdom: Animalia
- Phylum: Cnidaria
- Subphylum: Anthozoa
- Class: Hexacorallia
- Order: Actiniaria
- Family: Aiptasiidae
- Genus: Exaiptasia; Grajales & Rodriguez, 2014
- Species: E. pallida

Binomial name
- Exaiptasia pallida (Agassiz in Verrill, 1864)

Synonyms
- Aiptasia agassizii Andres, 1883; Aiptasia pallida (Agassiz in Verrill, 1864); Dysactis pallida Agassiz in Verrill, 1864; Paranthea pallida (Agassiz in Verrill, 1864)

= Exaiptasia =

Genus of sea anemones

Exaiptasia is a genus of sea anemone in the family Aiptasiidae, native to shallow waters in the temperate western Atlantic Ocean, the Caribbean Sea and the Gulf of Mexico. It is monotypic with a single species, Exaiptasia diaphana, and commonly known as the brown anemone, glass anemone, pale anemone, or simply as Aiptasia.

== Description ==
Ejection and retraction of defense apparatus acontia in Exaiptasia pallida

Exaiptasia diaphana has a slender brownish or whitish translucent column up to 2.5 cm (1 in) long, girdled by two rows of slits through which acontia (threads armed with nematocysts) can protrude. The oral disc, up to 1 cm (0.4 in) wide, has a central mouth surrounded by a whorl of up to 96 variable-length tentacles; a few of these are extra long, the majority are fairly long and a few are short.

== Distribution and habitat ==
Exaiptasia diaphana is a common species of sea anemone occurring in the western Atlantic Ocean, round the coast of the United States from Maine to Florida, and throughout the Caribbean Sea and the Gulf of Mexico. It occurs in a range of habitats including shallow areas with hard substrates and mangrove swamps.

== Ecology ==
Exaiptasia diaphana is a zooxanthellate species and has a symbiotic relationship with dinoflagellates, single celled photosynthetic organisms which are incorporated into its tissues.

Exaiptasia diaphana is a fast growing species that can quickly cover underwater surfaces. It is preyed on by several nudibranchs, including Berghia coerulescens, Berghia stephanieae and Spurilla neapolitana. The nudibranchs tend to acquire the brownish colour of the zooxanthellae found in the sea anemone's tissues; they also incorporate the anemone's nematocysts into their bodies, which may serve a defensive function.

== Relationships with humans ==
Exaiptasia diaphana is easy to keep in the laboratory and is used as a model organism, when it can serve as a proxy for coral which is more difficult to maintain and research. It has been used in studying the details of the evolution and function of the little-understood processes involved in endosymbiosis. It is also susceptible to certain coral diseases and has been used as a surrogate model to study coral biology. Sea anemones exhibit great powers of regeneration; lost parts swiftly regrow and E. diaphana can be vivisected in the laboratory and then returned to the aquarium where it will heal. These very characteristics of hardiness and regeneration from parts render E. diaphana a pest in the marine reef aquarium.

The genome of this sea anemone has been sequenced.
