= Berghia marcusi =

Scientific classification
- Kingdom: Animalia
- Phylum: Mollusca
- Class: Gastropoda
- Order: Nudibranchia
- Suborder: Aeolidacea
- Family: Aeolidiidae
- Genus: Berghia
- Species: B. marcusi

Binomial name
- Berghia marcusi Dominguez, Troncoso & García, 2008

Species of gastropod

Berghia marcusi is a species of sea slug, an aeolid nudibranch. It is a shell-less marine gastropod mollusc in the family Aeolidiidae.

== Distribution ==
This species is present in western Atlantic Ocean, from Florida to Jamaica and south to Brazil (Rio de Janeiro, São Paulo).

== Description ==
Berghia marcusi has a maximum reported size of 16.6 mm. It is a translucent white animal with a pattern of orange patches on the head and orange lines at the bases of the cerata.
