= Decerebration =

Surgical elimination of cerebral brain function

- Specialty: Neurology
- Uses: Brain research

Decerebration is the elimination of cerebral brain function in an animal by removing the cerebrum, cutting across the brain stem, or severing certain arteries in the brain stem.

As a result, the animal loses certain reflexes that are integrated in different parts of the brain. Furthermore, the reflexes which are functional will be hyperreactive (and therefore very accentuated) due to the removal of inhibiting higher- brain centers (e.g. the facilitatory area of the reticular formation will not receive regulating input from cerebellum, basal ganglia and the cortex).

== Methods ==
Decerebration describes the ligation along the neural axis in distinct parts of the brain in experimental animals. Generally:

- lower decerebration (the cut is made above the upper border of the pons)
- middle decerebration (cut is made through the red nucleus)
- upper decerebration (cut is made so the cortical area is removed)

Lower decerebration results in a "bulbospinal" animal: reflexes which are integrated within the spinal cord and medulla oblongata are functional, reflexes integrated in midbrain and cortex are absent.

With difference to decortication there is pontine transection, thus sparing of the VestibuloSpinal (VS) and ReticuloSpinal (RES). The involved tracts are the corticospinal and rubrospinal tract. Decerebration in humans tends to have a worse prognosis than decortication.

== Effects ==
The most obvious accentuation is seen in the tonic labyrinthine reflexes, the otolithic organs mediate input about the gravitational force exerted on the body and the labyrinthine reflex acts on the extensor muscles in order to resist this gravitational force. In an animal where the cortical areas or the midbrain have been "cut off" from the neural axis, this reflex is hyperactive and the animal will maximally extend all four limbs. This phenomenon is known as decerebrate rigidity. In humans, true decerebrate rigidity is rare since the damage to the brain centers it might be caused by usually are lethal. However, decorticate rigidity can be caused by bleeding in the internal capsule which causes damage to upper motor neurons. The symptoms of decorticate rigidity are flexion in the upper limbs and extension in the lower limbs.
