= Berghia verrucicornis =

Scientific classification
- Kingdom: Animalia
- Phylum: Mollusca
- Class: Gastropoda
- Order: Nudibranchia
- Suborder: Aeolidacea
- Family: Aeolidiidae
- Genus: Berghia
- Species: B. verrucicornis

Binomial name
- Berghia verrucicornis (A. Costa, 1867)

Synonyms
- Eolidia cavolinii Vérany, 1846; Eolis grossularia P. Fischer, 1869; Facelina variegata d'Oliveira, 1895; Flabellina verrucicornis A. Costa, 1867 (original combination); Spurilla margaritae Labbé, 1923; Spurilla verrucicornis (A. Costa, 1867)

Species of gastropod

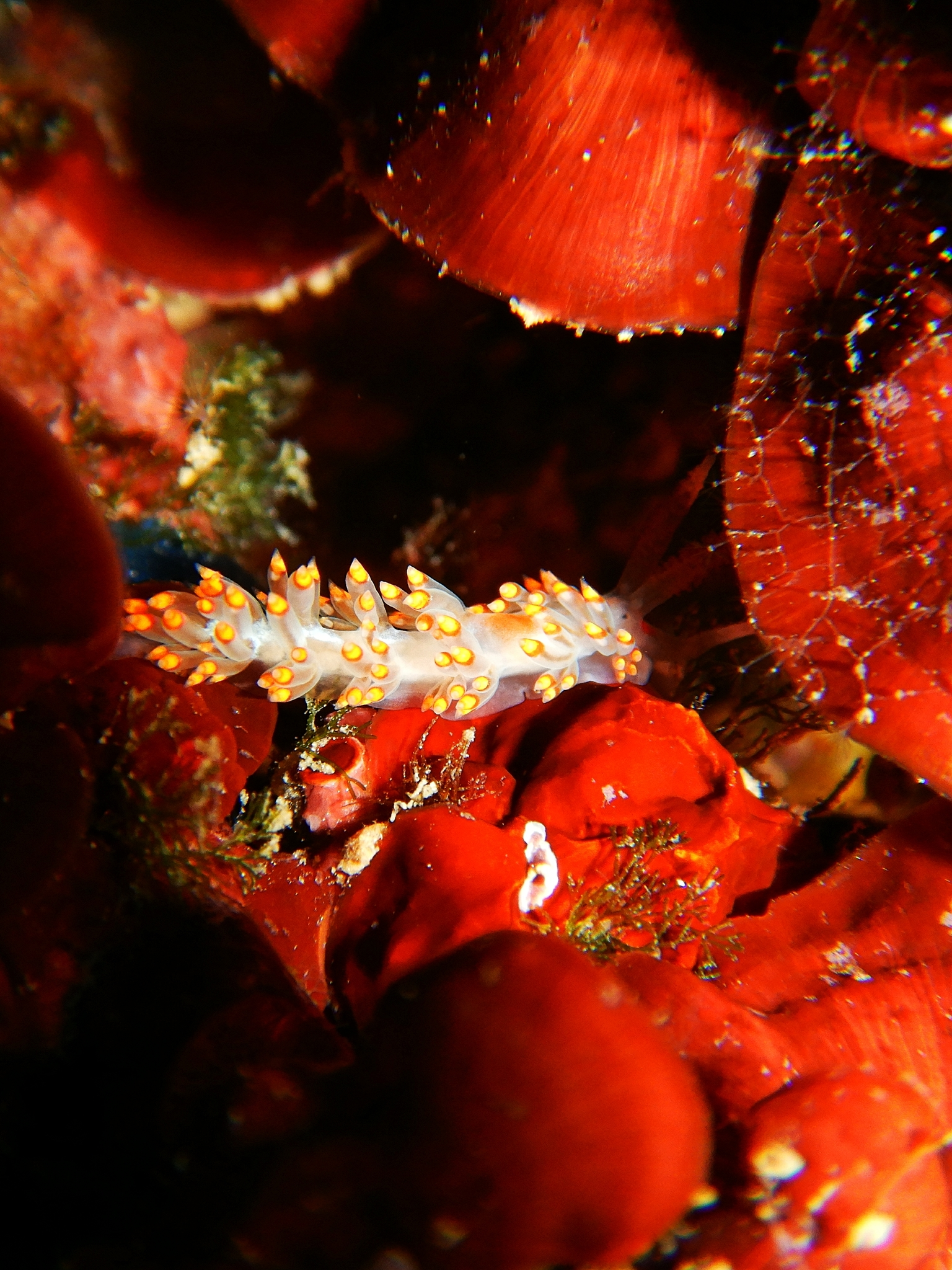
Photo of Berghia verrucicornis

Berghia verrucicornis is a species of sea slug, an aeolid nudibranch. It is a shell-less marine gastropod mollusc in the family Aeolidiidae.

== Distribution ==
This species was described from the Gulf of Naples, Italy. It is widespread in the Mediterranean Sea. On the eastern coasts of the North Atlantic Ocean Berghia verrucicornis is reported from the Bassin d"Arcachon south to Senegal and Ghana. Reports of this species from elsewhere appear to be of similar separate species, in particular Berghia stephanieae.

== Description ==
This species has a maximum reported size of 20 mm.

== Habitat ==
This species is found in depths of 0 m to 11 m.

== In the aquarium ==
The species from aquaria eating Aiptasia anemones has been called Berghia verrucicornis, but is actually the species Berghia stephanieae, which was described in 2005.
