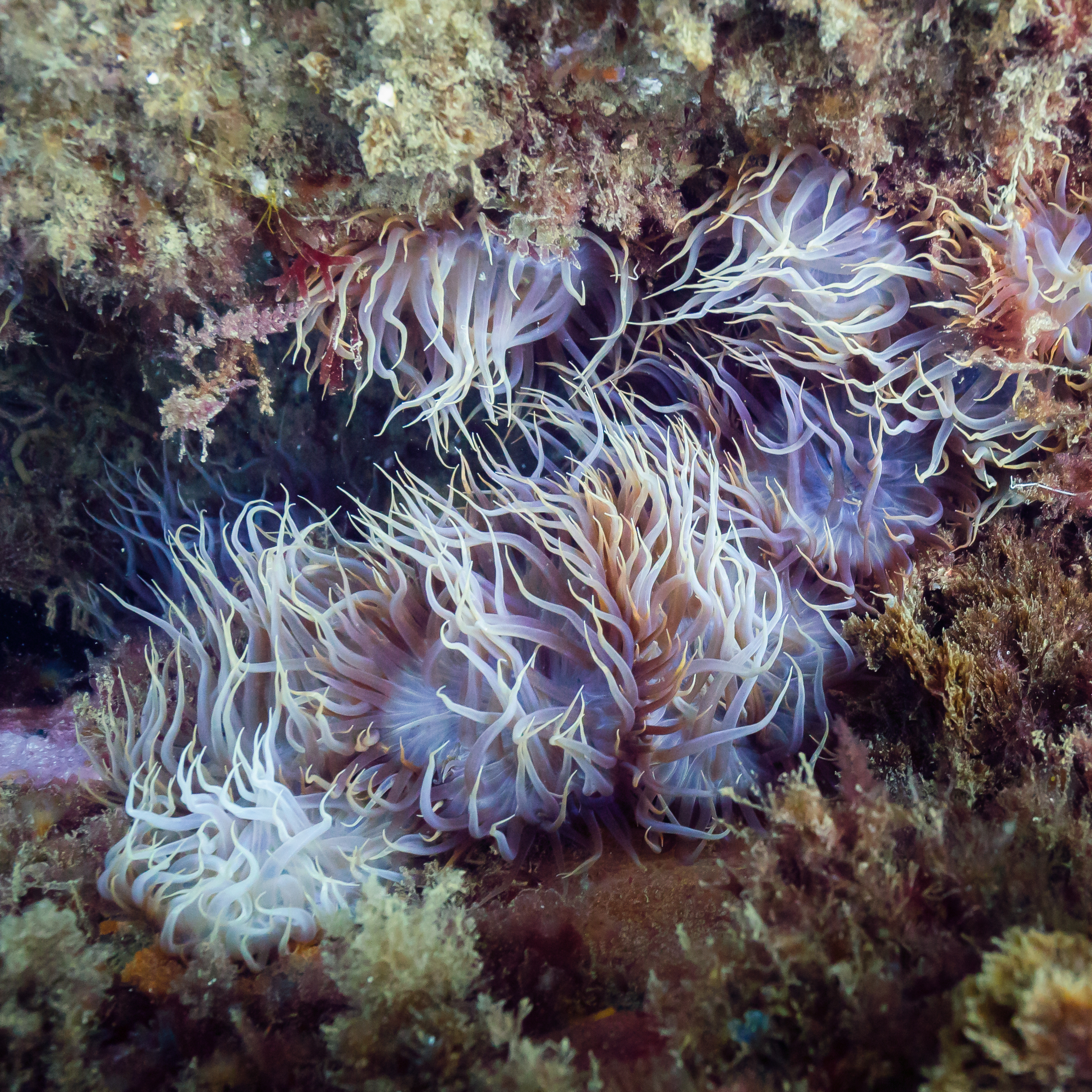

Scientific classification
- Kingdom: Animalia
- Phylum: Cnidaria
- Subphylum: Anthozoa
- Class: Hexacorallia
- Order: Actiniaria
- Family: Aiptasiidae
- Genus: Aiptasia; Gosse, 1858

= Aiptasia =

Genus of sea anemones

Aiptasia is a genus of a symbiotic cnidarian belonging to the subphylum Anthozoa (sea anemones, corals). Aiptasia is a widely distributed genus of temperate and tropical sea anemones of benthic lifestyle typically found living on mangrove roots and hard substrates. These anemones, as well as many other cnidarian species, often contain symbiotic dinoflagellate unicellular algae of the genus Symbiodinium living inside nutritive cells. The symbionts provide food mainly in the form of lipids and sugars produced from photosynthesis to the host while the hosts provides inorganic nutrients and a constant and protective environment to the algae. Species of Aiptasia are relatively weedy anemones able to withstand a relatively wide range of salinities and other water quality conditions. In the case of A. pallida and A. pulchella, their hardiness coupled with their ability to reproduce very quickly and out-compete other species in culture gives these anemones the status of pest from the perspective of coral reef aquarium hobbyists. These very characteristics make them easy to grow in the laboratory and thus they are extensively used as model organisms for scientific study. In this respect, Aiptasia have contributed a significant amount of knowledge regarding cnidarian biology, especially human understanding of cnidarian-algal symbioses, a biological phenomenon crucial to the survival of corals and coral reef ecosystems. The dependence of coral reefs on the health of the symbiosis is dramatically illustrated by the devastating effects experienced by corals due to the loss of algal symbionts in response to environmental stress, a phenomenon known as coral bleaching.

The genus was named by the English naturalist Philip Henry Gosse based on the Ancient Greek ἀεί (aeí, "always") and πετάω (petáō, "spread wings"), in reference to these anemones' constantly extended tentacles.

== Species ==
Species in the genus Aiptasia include:

- Aiptasia californica Carlgren, 1952
- Aiptasia couchii (Cocks, 1851)
- Aiptasia diaphana (Rapp, 1829)
- Aiptasia insignis Carlgren, 1941
- Aiptasia inula (Duchassaing & Michelotti, 1864)
- Aiptasia leiodactyla Pax, 1910
- Aiptasia mimosa (Duchassaing & Michelotti, 1864)
- Aiptasia minuta (Verrill, 1866)
- Aiptasia mutabilis (Gravenhorst, 1831)
- Aiptasia prima (Stephenson, 1918)
- Aiptasia pulchella Carlgren, 1943
- Aiptasia tagetes (Duchassaing & Michelotti, 1864)

== Morphology ==
Cnidarian species are found in one of two body forms: the polyp and the medusae. Some alternate between these two forms during their life cycle. In the case of Aiptasia, and all anthozoans, the body form is the polyp. The body is composed of a pedal disc with which Aiptasia attaches to the substrate, a smooth and elongated body column and an oral disc which bears the mouth and long stinging tentacles.

== Reproduction ==
Aiptasia can reproduce both sexually and asexually. Asexual reproduction occurs when a small segment is separated from the pedal disk. A single cell can be enough for a new Aiptasia anemone to form. The separated segment will start growing and develop a new polyp. A new polyp is usually formed within 14 days. The new polyps are clones of the original Aiptasia. Aiptasia diaphana can produce both male and female offspring through asexual reproduction. Some clones even develop into hermaphrodites.

Sexual reproduction in the well-studied Aiptasia pallida and Aiptasia pulchella, is dioecious, meaning that individual Aiptasia are of separate sexes. During spawning, anemones release their gametes into the water where fertilization occurs. The resulting zygote becomes a free swimming planula larva which eventually settles onto a suitable substrate where it undergoes metamorphosis to become a small polyp. Newly produced larvae are aposymbiotic meaning they do not contain symbionts. The larvae or newly settled polyps can acquire symbiotic algae from the environment.

External factors affect the method of reproductions. While asexual reproduction is possible under diverse environmental conditions, sexual reproduction is dependent on lunar cycles and low environmental stress.

== In the aquarium ==
Aiptasia sp. are considered pests in the marine aquarium hobby, because they are stressful to coral around them, and occasionally even sting fish and desirable invertebrates. They are often accidentally imported along with live rock. Once present in the aquarium, the polyps are notoriously difficult to remove as attempts to remove often inadvertently create more, due to new polyps regenerating from remnants. Hobbyists commonly put peppermint shrimp or certain species of filefish or butterfly fish inside the aquarium to control Aiptasia populations, as the arthropods regularly prey on small cnidarian polyps. The nudibranch Aeolidiella stephanieae, is considered one of the best predators for Aiptasia sp. This species used to be called and is still commonly referred to as Berghia verrucicornis. A few of the more popular fish considered for controlling aiptasia are Acreichthys tomentosus, the bristletail filefish; Chelmon rostratus, the copperband butterflyfish; and Chaetodon kleinii, the sunburst butterflyfish; however these fish are potentially detrimental to other, desirable, sessile invertebrates.
