= Pedal disc =

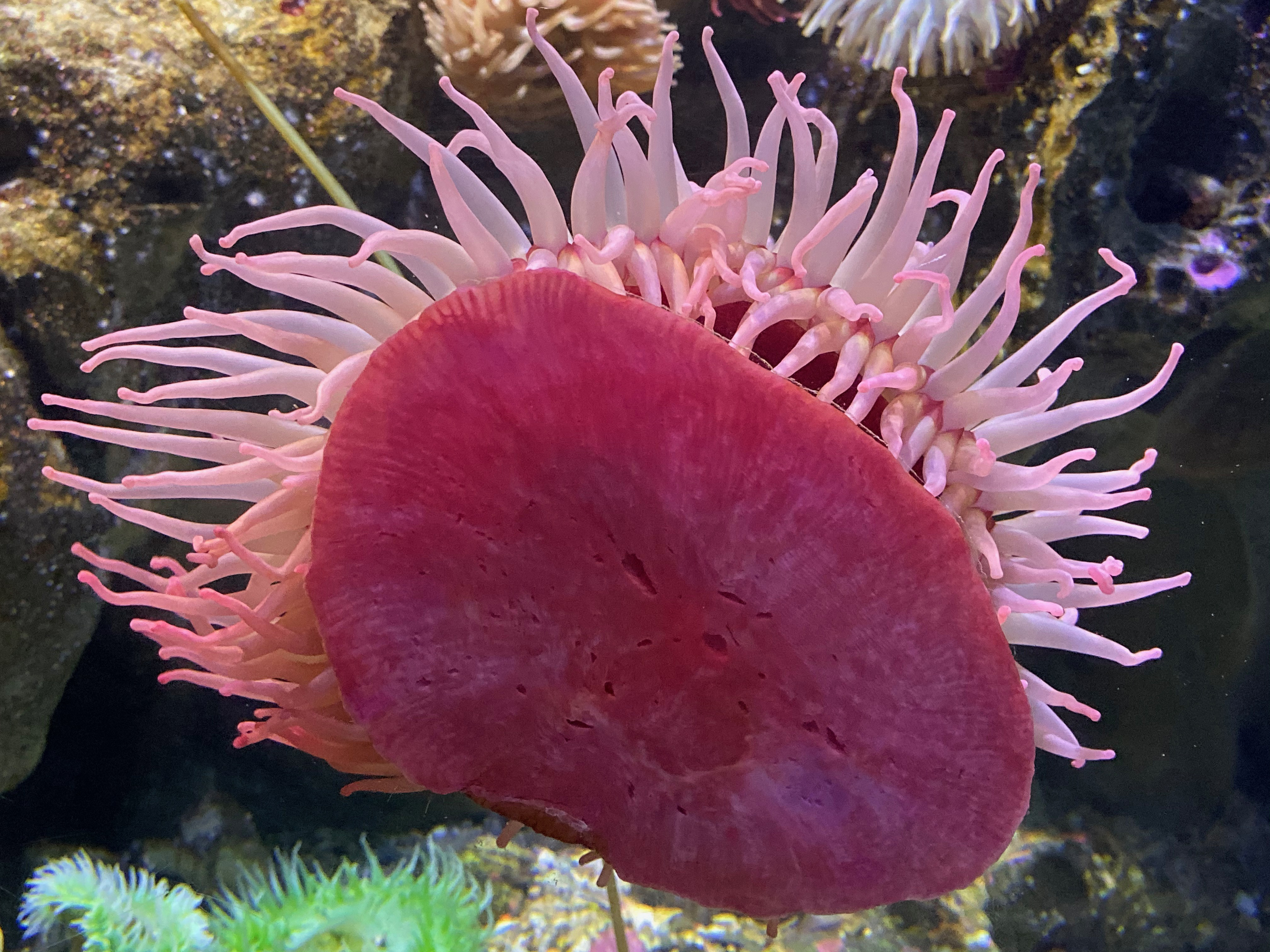
The pedal disc of an anemone adhering to a glass tank

1 Tentacles 2.Mouth 3.Retracting muscles 4.Gonads 5.Acontial filaments 6.Pedal disk 7.Ostium 8.Coelenteron 9.Sphincter muscle 10.Mesentery 11.Column 12.Pharynx

The Pedal disc, or basal plate, is the surface opposite to the mouth of the sea anemone. It serves to attach the anemone to the substrate, or hard surface, upon which it lives. It is characterized by a thin, harder plate composed of muscle and skin tissue that expands and produces an adhesive substance during the adhesion process. The pedal disk first appeared around 741 million years ago with the cnidarian faction, with the taxa diversifying 540 million years ago, before the Cambrian era. Anemones are not completely sessile, the pedal disc allows for both attachment and detachment from most substrate, allowing the anemone to react to local phenomena, albeit slowly.

Biological adhesion is not unique to sea anemones or cnidaria. it has been observed across taxa of bivalves, barnacles, starfish, geckos, and frogs.

== Anatomy ==
The pedal disc is composed of muscle and skin tissue that can change volume and surface area substantially depending on the process needed. While in its relaxed state (expanded), the disc takes on a bloated shape, increasing the surface area on the substrate allowing for better adhesion. Hydrostatic pressure causes the tissue around the disc to bulge outwards even more, often giving the base of anemones their shape.

== Function ==
=== Adhesion ===
The Pedal disk secretes a glue like adhesive using specialized proteins, glycans, polysaccharides and quinones that are secreted through specialized cells within the ectoderm and mesoglea of the basal plate. Across the entire surface of the ectoderm of the anemone, there are microvilli, which congregate in the pedal disc and form patterns complementary to the substrate which the anemone is attached. The adhesive attaches to these microvilli along with the substrate to properly adhere the anemone to the substrate.

The detachment process is a combination of muscular and chemical action from the anemone. the detachment process starts when the anemone reacts to external stimuli at a certain threshold, about 30 stimuli at a rate of one shock every 5 seconds in certain lab conditions. When the anemone reaches this threshold the slow system 1 neural pathway begins to fire which promotes the contraction of the pedal disk and the dissolution of the protein rich adhesive. As this pathway continues to fire, the promotion becomes so great that the anemone transfers from a sessile to a mobile state to escape the stimuli.

=== Locomotion ===
Anemones can gradually shift themselves by adhering and detaching different parts of their pedal disc to slowly move along a substrate in a process known as "creeping". The facilitation of creeping is slow and uses a similar detachment process (see adhesion) but is localized within the opposite side that the anemone moves.
