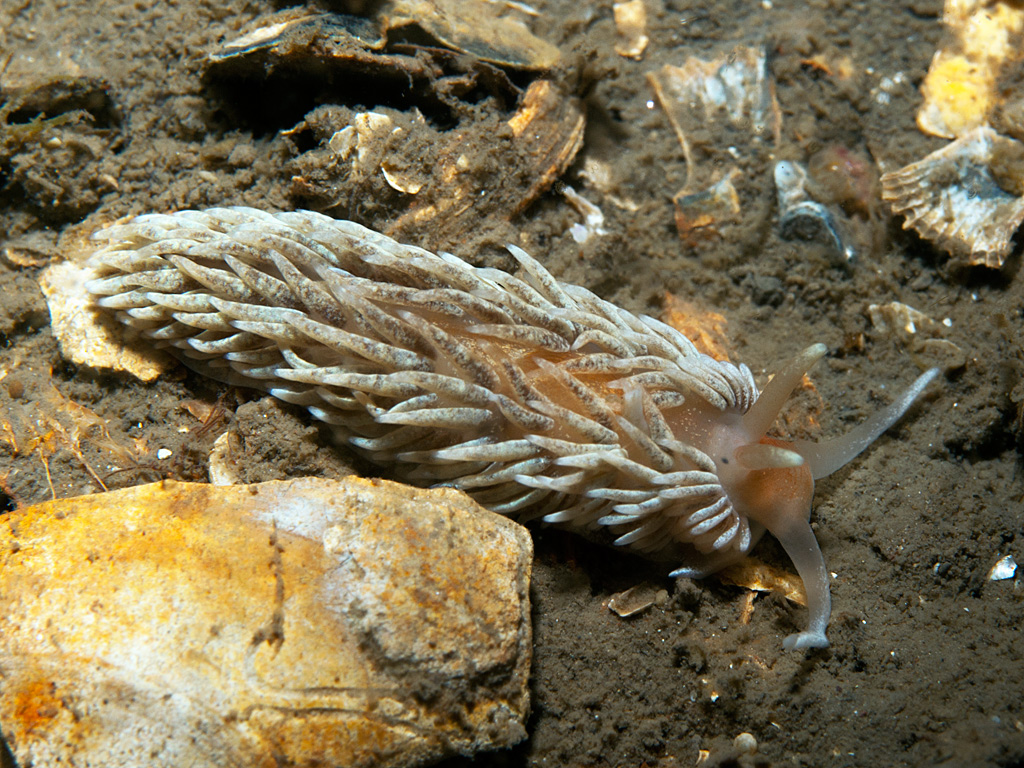
- Aeolidiella glauca, Strangford Lough, Irish Sea.

Scientific classification
- Kingdom: Animalia
- Phylum: Mollusca
- Class: Gastropoda
- Order: Nudibranchia
- Suborder: Aeolidacea
- Family: Aeolidiidae
- Genus: Aeolidiella; Bergh, 1867

Synonyms
- Aeolidina Pruvot-Fol, 1951 (suppressed under ICZN Opinion 780); Eolidina Quatrefages, 1843 (suppressed under ICZN Opinion 780)

= Aeolidiella =

Genus of gastropods

Aeolidiella is a genus of sea slugs, aeolid nudibranchs, marine gastropod molluscs in the family Aeolidiidae.

== Species ==
Species within the genus Aeolidiella include:

- Aeolidiella alderi (Cocks, 1852)
- Aeolidiella avatar Carmona, Martín-Hervás, Pola, Gosliner & Cervera, 2026
- Aeolidiella glauca (Alder & Hancock, 1845)
- Aeolidiella rubra (Cantraine, 1835)
- Aeolidiella sanguinea (Norman, 1877)

Synonyms

- Aeolidiella alba Risbec, 1928: synonym of Bulbaeolidia alba (Risbec, 1928)
- Aeolidiella albopunctata Lin, 1992: synonym of Spurilla braziliana MacFarland, 1909 (junior subjective synonym)
- Aeolidiella bassethulli Risbec, 1928: synonym of Anteaeolidiella cacaotica (Stimpson, 1855)
- Aeolidiella benteva (Er. Marcus, 1958): synonym of Anteaeolidiella benteva (Er. Marcus, 1958)
- Aeolidiella chromosoma (Cockerell & Eliot, 1905): synonym of Spurilla chromosoma Cockerell & Eliot, 1905
- Aeolidiella croisicensis Labbé, 1923: synonym of Spurilla croisicensis (Labbé, 1923)
- Aeolidiella drusilla Bergh, 1900: synonym of Novaeolidiella drusilla (Bergh, 1900) (superseded combination)
- Aeolidiella faustina Bergh, 1900: synonym of Spurilla faustina (Bergh, 1900)
- Aeolidiella hulli Risbec, 1928: synonym of Anteaeolidiella cacaotica (Stimpson, 1855)
- Aeolidiella indica Bergh, 1888: synonym of Anteaeolidiella indica (Bergh, 1888)
- Aeolidiella japonica Eliot, 1913: synonym of Bulbaeolidia japonica (Eliot, 1913)
- Aeolidiella lurana Marcus & Marcus, 1967: synonym of Anteaeolidiella lurana (Marcus & Marcus, 1967)
- Aeolidiella multicolor Macnae, 1954: synonym of Anteaeolidiella saldanhensis (Barnard, 1927)
- Aeolidiella occidentalis Bergh, 1875: synonym of Baeolidia occidentalis Bergh, 1875
- Aeolidiella olivae MacFarland, 1966: synonym of Anteaeolidiella oliviae
- Aeolidiella orientalis Bergh, 1888: synonym of Anteaeolidiella orientalis (Bergh, 1888)
- Aeolidiella saldanhensis Barnard, 1927: synonym of Anteaeolidiella saldanhensis (Barnard, 1927)
- Aeolidiella soemmeringii Bergh, 1882: synonym of Aeolidiella alderi (Cocks, 1852)
- Aeolidiella stephanieae Valdés, 2005: synonym of Berghia stephanieae (Valdés, 2005)
- Aeolidiella takanosimensis Baba, 1930: synonym of Anteaeolidiella foulisi (Angas, 1864)
