= Long tentacle anemone =

Long tentacle anemone may refer to several different species of sea anemone:

- Long-tentacled anemone (Anthopleura michaelseni)
- Long tentacle anemone (Macrodactyla doreensis)
- Long tentacle anemone (Sebae anemone)
