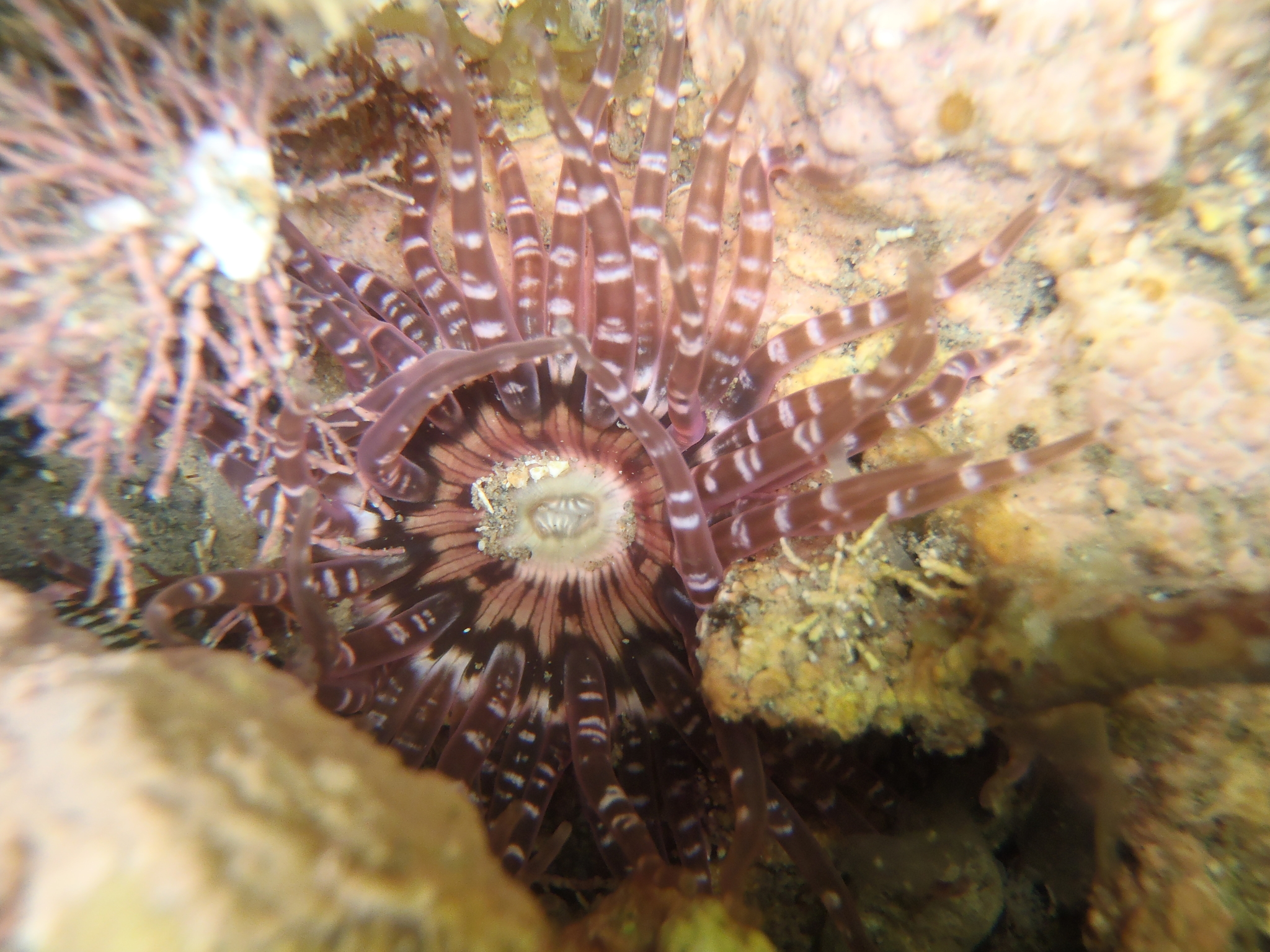

Scientific classification
- Domain: Eukaryota
- Kingdom: Animalia
- Phylum: Cnidaria
- Class: Hexacorallia
- Order: Actiniaria
- Family: Actiniidae
- Genus: Anthopleura
- Species: A. rosea

Binomial name
- Anthopleura rosea (Stuckey & Walton, 1910)

= Anthopleura rosea =

Species of sea anemone

Anthopleura rosea, commonly known as the rose anemone or rock pool anemone, is a small pink anemone endemic to New Zealand.

== Distribution and habitat ==
A. rosea is found on the coast of New Zealand's North and South Islands but is more common in the South Island.

It attaches to rocks and stones in rock pools and in fine gravel or coarse mud, usually in sheltered places.

== Description ==
This small anemone has a diameter of 5 millimetres.

When underwater, it extends 48 short tentacles arranged in 3 whorls. These are a light pink colour with bands of white and brown. Some may have green or brown coloured tentacles due to the presence of a symbiotic algae known as zooxanthellae which may provide nutrition.

Its column varies in colour from white, grey and green to bright orange. It is covered with white warts (verrucae) to which pieces of sand and shell become stuck.

The oral disc is purple or white in colour with dark coloured rays that expand to its edges. Its mouth is brown that fades to white or yellow towards the margin.
