= Aeolidiella rubra =

Scientific classification
- Domain: Eukaryota
- Kingdom: Animalia
- Phylum: Mollusca
- Class: Gastropoda
- Order: Nudibranchia
- Suborder: Cladobranchia
- Family: Aeolidiidae
- Genus: Aeolidiella
- Species: A. rubra

Binomial name
- Aeolidiella rubra (Cantraine, 1835)

Synonyms
- Cavolina rubra Cantraine, 1835; Eolidina angulata Alder, J. & A. Hancock, 1844; Eolis paradoxa Quatrefages, J.L.A. De, 1843

Species of gastropod

Aeolidiella rubra is a species of sea slug, an aeolid nudibranch in the family Aeolidiidae.

== Distribution ==
This marine species was described from Livorno, Italy.
