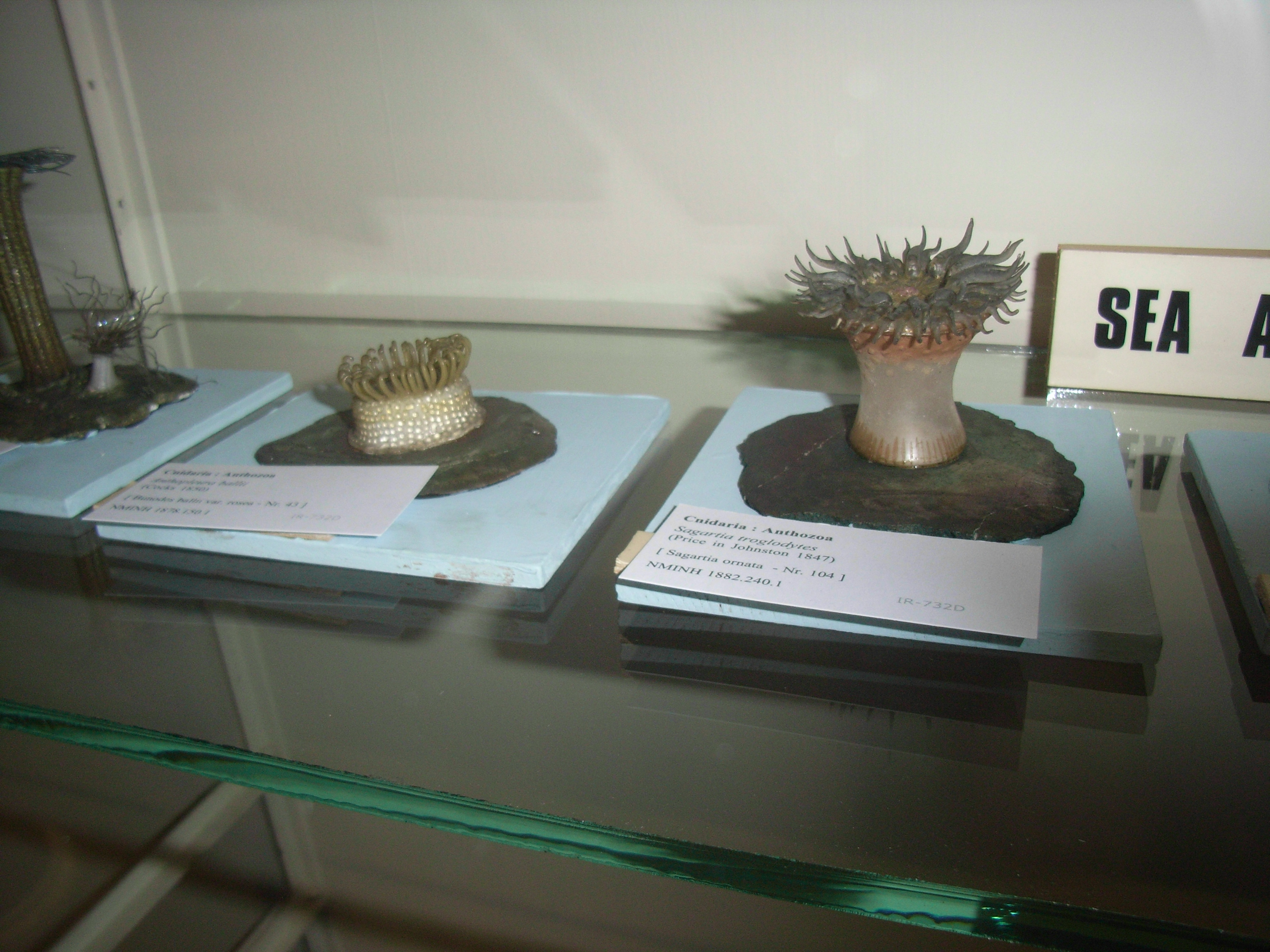
- Blaschka models : left – Anthopleura ballii right – Sagartia troglodytes

Scientific classification
- Kingdom: Animalia
- Phylum: Cnidaria
- Subphylum: Anthozoa
- Class: Hexacorallia
- Order: Actiniaria
- Family: Actiniidae
- Genus: Anthopleura
- Species: A. ballii

Binomial name
- Anthopleura ballii (Cocks, 1851)

= Anthopleura ballii =

Species of cnidarian

Anthopleura ballii, commonly known as the red speckled anemone, is a species of sea anemone in the family Actiniidae. It is found in shallow water in the northeastern Atlantic Ocean.

== Description ==
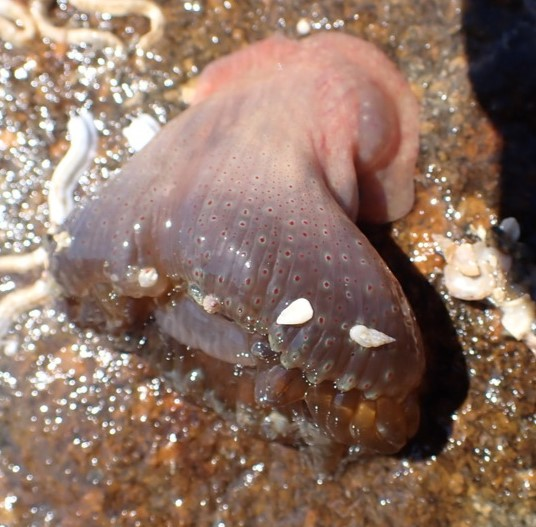
Anthopleura ballii at low tide, showing the distinctive warts on its trumpet-shaped column. Brittany, France.

Anthopleura ballii has a broad base up to 5 cm (2 in) across and a trumpet-shaped column up to 10 cm (4 in) high. The surface of the column bears forty-eight longitudinal rows of small warts, each tipped with red. The oral disc is wide and there are up to 96 tapering tentacles arranged in five whorls. These are retractable to a limited extent and are flecked with white. The colouring of this species is variable, being some shade of red or yellow, with the tentacles sometimes having an iridescent green sheen. The warts are non-adhesive. This is in contrast to the closely related glaucous pimplet (Anthopleura thallia), which has gravel or debris adhering to the column.

== Distribution and habitat ==
Anthopleura ballii is native to northeastern Atlantic Ocean and the coasts of Western Europe. It is found on rocky coasts from the intertidal zone down to depths of about 25 metres (82 ft). It usually occurs in crevices, in the holes made by piddocks as they burrow, under boulders and in other concealed locations. It is sometimes attached to pebbles and shells and may be semi-immersed in sand or mud.

== Biology ==
Anthopleura ballii contains unicellular dinoflagellates living inside the tissues. These are species of Symbiodinium and are commonly known as zooxanthellae. They are photosynthetic organisms and provide the sea anemone with nutrients and energy, the products of photosynthesis. This type of arrangement is common in corals and sea anemones in nutrient-deficient tropical seas but is rare in temperate waters, which tend to be nutrient-rich. Researchers have found that the ova become infected with maternal zooxanthellae just before spawning takes place. The zooxanthellae are restricted to one side of the ovum and during the rearrangement of tissues that takes place during the development of the embryo into a planula larva, the zooxanthellae are confined to the endoderm of the larva and to the gastrodermal cells of the adult. This method of acquiring zooxanthellae is unusual. In tropical seas zooxanthellae are frequently liberated into the sea by symbiotic invertebrates and occur in the faeces of predators feeding on symbiotic cnidarians. This means that there is little need for maternal transfer of symbionts. This is not the case in temperate seas where free-living zooxanthellae are scarce.

A. ballii is gonochoric, with individuals being either male or female. It is a broadcast spawner.

== Etymology ==
The name honours the Irish naturalist Robert Ball.
