= William Pennington Cocks =

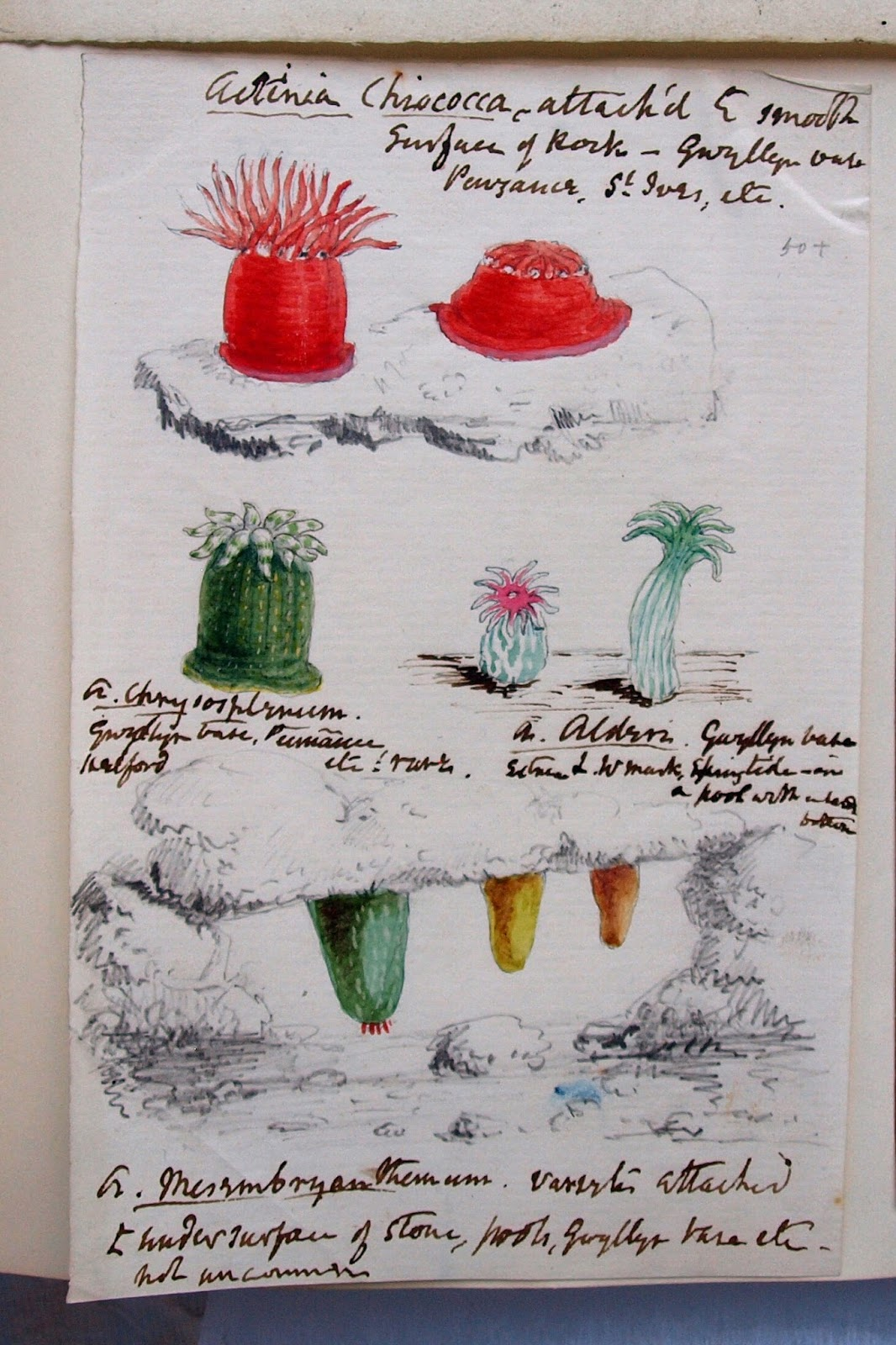
William Pennington Cocks Sea Anemones

William Pennington Cocks (1791–1878) was an English surgeon naturalist principally interested in marine fauna. He was born in Devon. Owing to ill-health, when he was still only 51, he retired to Falmouth in Cornwall. He described the nudibranch Aeolidiella alderi and the sea anemone Anthopleura ballii.

== Publications ==
partial list

- List of Echinodermata procured in Falmouth and neighbourhood from 1843 to 1849 Trans. Penz. Nat. Hist. Ant. Soc. 1 :292.
- Common objects of the sea-shore Falmouth.
- Nudibranchiate Mollusca Quarto pp. 8. Falmouth.
- Chitons Quarto pp. 12. Falmouth.Salt Water Mollusca Quarto pp. 16. Falmouth.
- Hints for facilitating the Records of Natural History Quarto. Falmouth.

Thirty papers, many undated, are listed in Boase and Courtenay (1874)
