= Anteaeolidiella fijensis =

Scientific classification
- Kingdom: Animalia
- Phylum: Mollusca
- Class: Gastropoda
- Order: Nudibranchia
- Suborder: Aeolidacea
- Family: Aeolidiidae
- Genus: Anteaeolidiella
- Species: A. fijensis

Binomial name
- Anteaeolidiella fijensis Carmona, Bhave, Salunkhe, Pola, Gosliner & Cervera, 2014

Species of gastropod

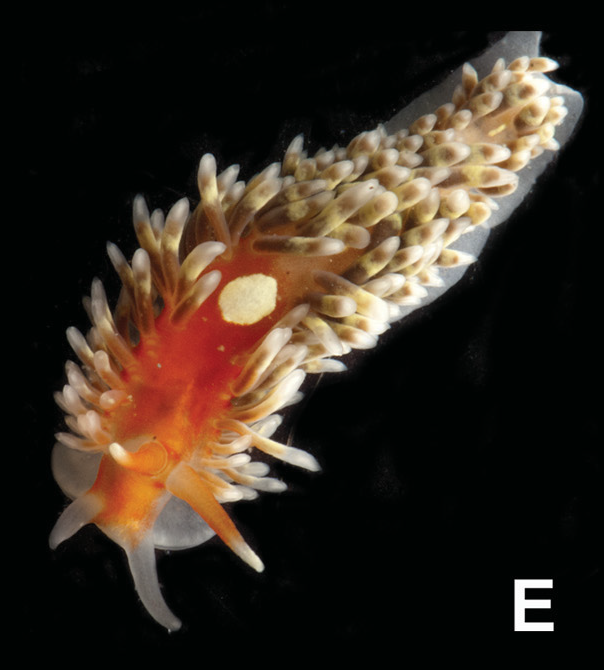
A. fijensis

Anteaeolidiella fijensis, is a species of sea slug, an aeolid nudibranch. It is a marine gastropod mollusc in the family Aeolidiidae.

== Distribution ==
This species was described from specimens collected under stones in 0-0.5 m of water at Laucala Bay, Suva, Fiji.

== Description ==
The body of Anteaeolidiella fijensis is translucent white, with diffuse orange pigment over the back. There is an orange patch on the head which extends from the rhinophores to just before the foot edge, leaving the foot edge translucent. Behind the rhinophores there is a translucent white area surrounded by orange pigment creating an inverted triangle shape. The rhinophores are translucent orange with white tips, and the oral tentacles are translucent white and slightly longer than the rhinophores. Black eyes are visible through the skin just behind the bases of the rhinophores. The cerata are long, moderately thick and slightly swollen. They extend from the rear of the rhinophores to the tail and leave a bare zone over the back. The cerata are diffusely covered with orange pigment, with a white band below the tip. The digestive gland is greenish or brownish. The cerata are arranged in six rows with as many as 15 cerata in the anterior rows and as few as 2 in the last rows.
