= Anthopleura variata =

Scientific classification
- Kingdom: Animalia
- Phylum: Cnidaria
- Subphylum: Anthozoa
- Class: Hexacorallia
- Order: Actiniaria
- Family: Actiniidae
- Genus: Anthopleura
- Species: A. variata

Binomial name
- Anthopleura variata Vassallo-Avalos, González-Muñoz, Morrone, Acuña, Durán-Fuentes, Stampar,Solís-Marín, and Rivas, 2024

Species of sea anemone

Anthopleura variata is a species of sea anemone. It is a species in the genus Anthopleura. The species was described in 2024.

== Description ==
The species' oral disk is flat, smooth and 3–9 mm coloured brown to olive green. The mouth is large, rounded and elevated on an oral cone with yellow or pink with white stripes surrounding it. The mesenterial insertions are visible as dark lines. The tentacles are conical, smooth and contractable. The pedal disk is well developed and 7–19 mm is diameter. The mesenteries are irregularly arranged. The retractor and basilar muscles are well developed. While the longitudinal muscles are ectodermal and the parietobasilar muscles have large and narrow mesogleal pennon. Zooxanthellates have a symbiotic relationship with the species.

== Distribution ==
The species is found in Baja California Sur, Mexico, attached to rocks, inside crevices and cracks in tidal pools, in medium to low intertidal zone. It forms aggregations and is usually partially covered by sand, with small rocks strongly attached to the column.

== Etymology ==
Anthopleura is Greek for anthōs: flowers and pleura: ribs. While the epithet variata in Latin means "varied, diverse". Referring to the distinctive variety of different colorations of the specimens.
