= Anthopleura nigrescens =

Scientific classification
- Kingdom: Animalia
- Phylum: Cnidaria
- Subphylum: Anthozoa
- Class: Hexacorallia
- Order: Actiniaria
- Family: Actiniidae
- Genus: Anthopleura
- Species: A. nigrescens

Binomial name
- Anthopleura nigrescens (Verrill, 1928)

Synonyms
- Anthopleura pacifica Uchida, 1938; Bunodactis nigrescens (Verrill, 1928); Tealiopsis nigrescens Verrill, 1928

Species of sea anemone

Anthopleura nigrescens, also referred to as the dusty anemone, is a sea anemone in the family Actinidae found in the Indo-Pacific.

== Description ==
The dusty anemone has a diameter of ¾ of an inch. It has a grayish, dusty brown or black coloration, depending on the DNA configuration.

== Distribution & habitat ==
Anthopleura nigrescens is found in the Indo-Pacific. In parts of Hawaii and Costa Rica, this sea anemone is frequently observed in shallow water in tiny rocky cracks. However, it has also been observed close to Taiwan's hydrothermal vents.

== Diet ==
Anthopleura nigrescens eat cyprids and copepods, which are a type of zooplankton; occasionally, they will eat prey such as gastropods, insects, eggs, and larvae. Research has shown that their diet tends to change depending on the specific sight and depth of water. The dusty anemone is a polyphagous predator.
