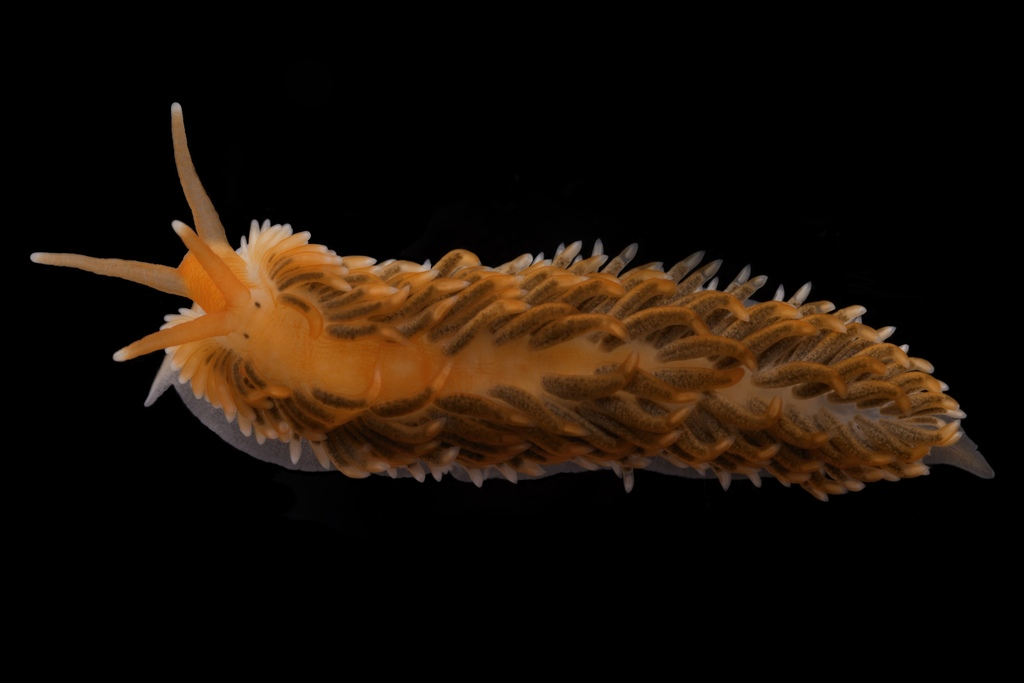

Scientific classification
- Kingdom: Animalia
- Phylum: Mollusca
- Class: Gastropoda
- Order: Nudibranchia
- Suborder: Aeolidacea
- Family: Aeolidiidae
- Genus: Aeolidiella
- Species: A. sanguinea

Binomial name
- Aeolidiella sanguinea (Norman, 1877)

Synonyms
- Eolis sanguinea Norman, 1877 (original combination)

= Aeolidiella sanguinea =

Species of gastropod

Aeolidiella sanguinea is a species of sea slug, an aeolid nudibranch in the family Aeolidiidae.

== Distribution ==
This marine species was described from Innislacken, Roundstone Bay, Ireland. It has been reported from the Atlantic coast of Europe from Scotland south to Portugal and in the Atlantic Ocean off the Azores.

== Description ==
Aeolidiella sanguinea is an aeolidiid nudibranch with a translucent red body and cerata. The rhinophores and oral tentacles are tipped with white. The body attains a length between 30 mm and 45 mm.
