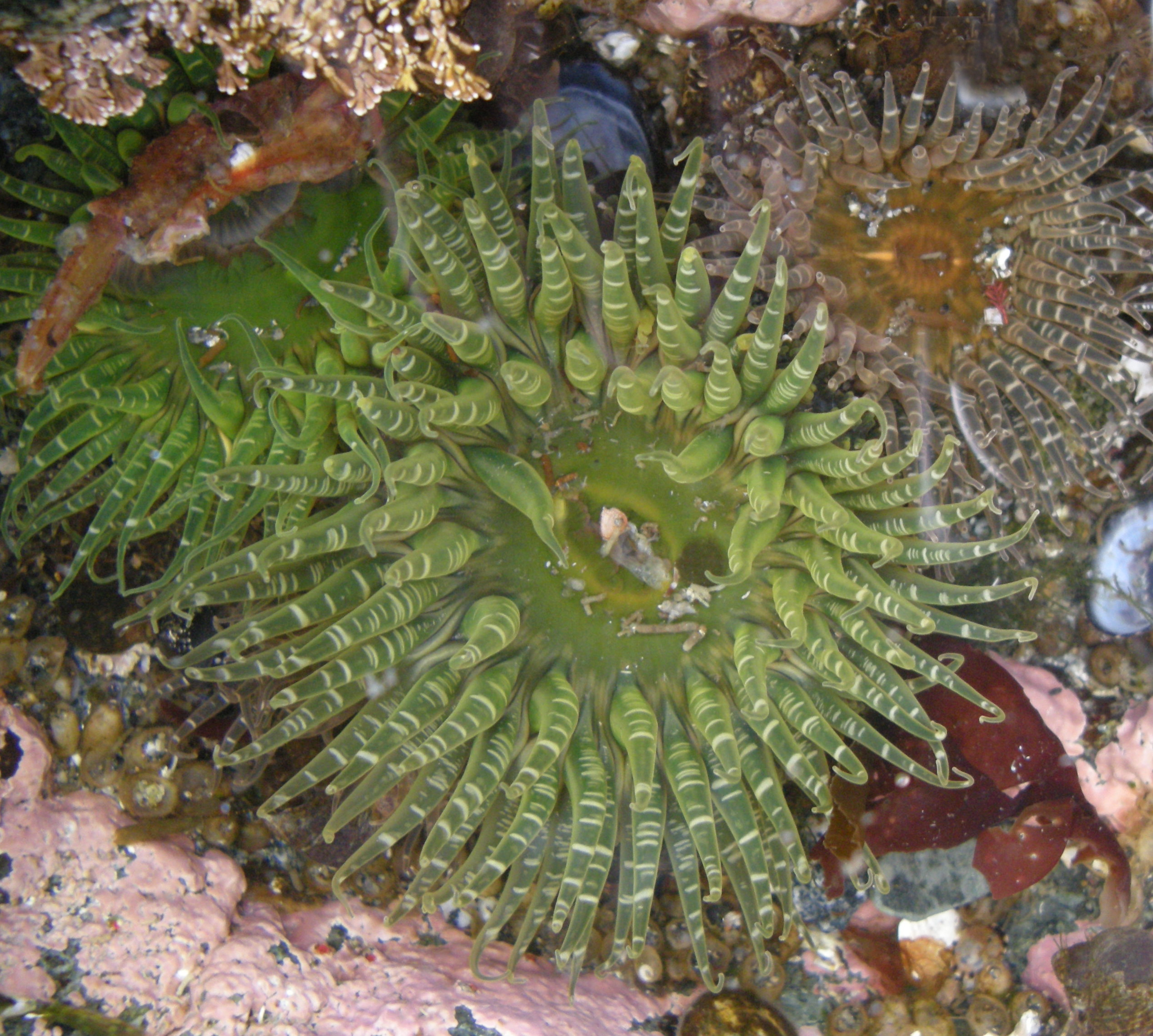

Scientific classification
- Domain: Eukaryota
- Kingdom: Animalia
- Phylum: Cnidaria
- Class: Hexacorallia
- Order: Actiniaria
- Family: Actiniidae
- Genus: Anthopleura
- Species: A. artemisia

Binomial name
- Anthopleura artemisia (Pickering in Dana, 1846)

Synonyms
- Actinia artemisia Pickering in Dana, 1846; Bunodes artemisia; Cereus artemisia (Pickering in Dana, 1846); Cribrina artemisia (Pickering in Dana, 1846); Evactus artemisia Verrill

= Anthopleura artemisia =

Species of sea anemone

Anthopleura artemisia is a species of sea anemone. It is known by a number of common names, including burrowing anemone and moonglow anemone. It was first described to science in 1846 in a volume by James Dwight Dana, reporting on the animals found on the United States Exploring Expedition. Dana attributes the description to Charles Pickering, who was a naturalist on the expedition.

== Description ==
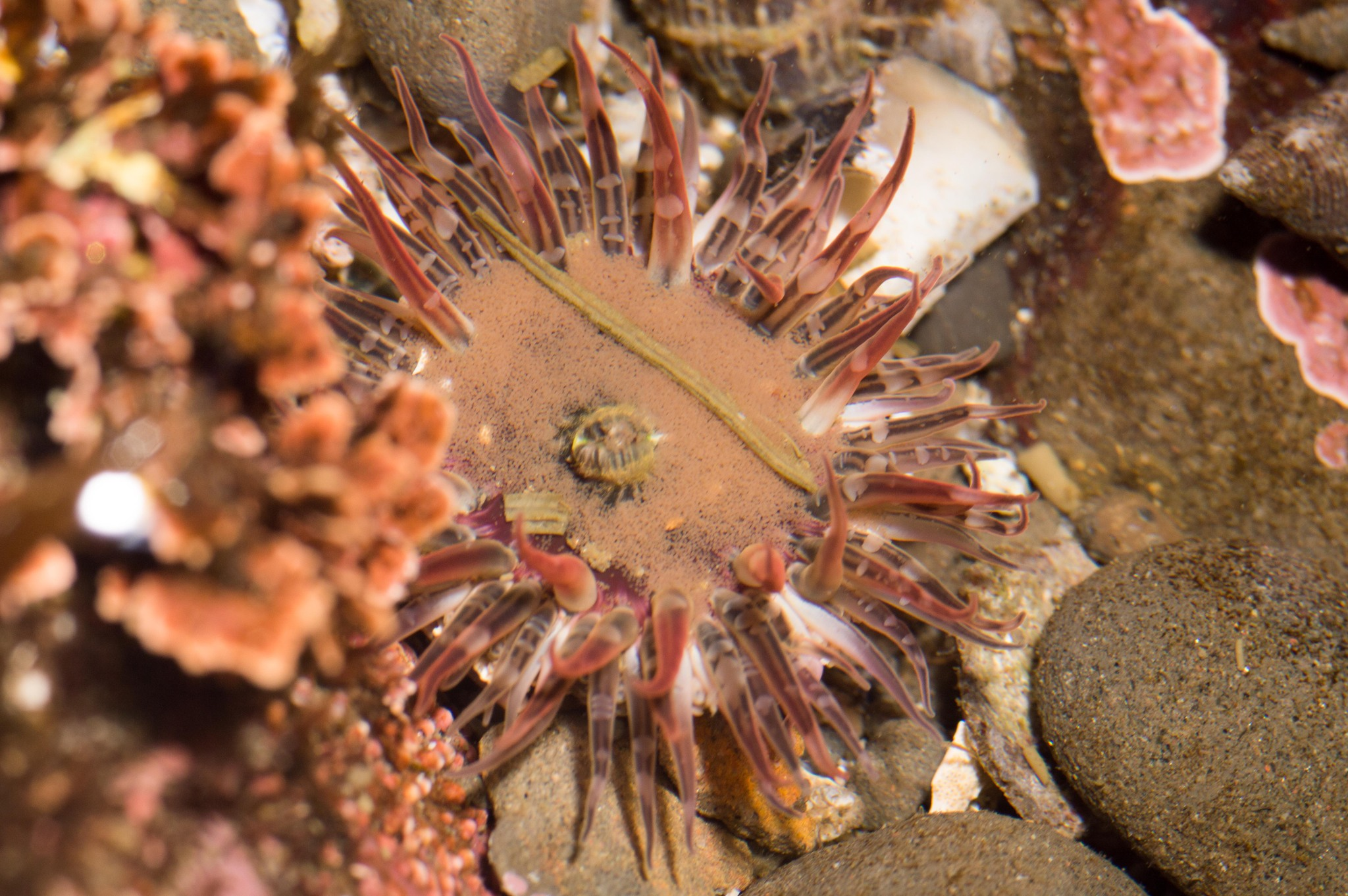
Anthopleura artemisia

As the name burrowing anemone suggests, the column of this animal is usually buried to a greater or lesser extent. In some individuals, the column may be completely buried, and only the oral disk and tentacles are visible. The buried portion of the column is pink or white, while the part above the substrate, if any, is green or brown. Including the buried portion, the column may reach 25 centimetres (9.8 in) in height. It may be up to 10 centimetres (3.9 in) in diameter. The upper third of the column is covered in longitudinal rows of rounded wart-like tubercules. They are sparse on the middle third, and usually absent on the lower third of the column.

The tentacles are slim and tapering. They are about half the width of the oral disk in length. They and the oral disk vary in color between individuals and can be green, brown, black, pink or orange. The tentacles are often banded in white. There are rarely more than five rows of tentacles circling the oral disk. They have special fighting tentacles, acrorhagi, to attack other anemones in too close proximity. When not inflated for an attack, these are inconspicuous. They appear as a single row of round, white bumps, underneath the outer row of tentacles.

Burrowing anemones are often solitary on the open coast, and are found living closer together in estuaries.

== Distribution ==
The burrowing anemone prefers sandy, shelly, muddy, or cobbled bottoms which are loose enough for the animal to bury itself. It must have something solid, such as a rock, at the bottom of the loose layer to anchor its column. This species has been documented inhabiting holes bored by clams. It is a shallow water anemone, living in the intertidal zone down to a depth of 30 metres (98 ft). It prefers sheltered bays to open ocean beaches. It has been found attached to pilings and floats. These animals can be found from Alaska to southern California, including Puget Sound. The type specimen referenced in the species description came from Discovery Bay, Washington.

== Life history ==
Burrowing anemones are gonochoric, which is to say that individuals are either male or female. Sexual reproduction occurs through broadcast spawning, where eggs and sperm are released into the sea to achieve fertilization. The releases of gametes appears to be coordinated, and mass spawning events have been observed at low tide. Fertilized eggs become free swimming larva.

This species is also capable of asexual reproduction through longitudinal fission. In essence, an anemone will split into two pieces, and each will become a genetic copy of the other.

Burrowing anemones are carnivores, eating unwary crabs that wander into their stinging tentacles. They are in turn preyed upon by the nudibranch Aeolidia papillosa, and likely other nudibranchs and small fish as well.
