= Anteaeolidiella takanosimensis =

Scientific classification
- Kingdom: Animalia
- Phylum: Mollusca
- Class: Gastropoda
- Order: Nudibranchia
- Suborder: Aeolidacea
- Family: Aeolidiidae
- Genus: Anteaeolidiella
- Species: A. takanosimensis

Binomial name
- Anteaeolidiella takanosimensis (Baba, 1930)

Synonyms
- Aeolidiella takanosimensis Baba, 1930

Species of mollusc

Anteaeolidiella takanosimensis, is a species of sea slug, an aeolid nudibranch. It is a marine gastropod mollusc in the family Aeolidiidae.

== Distribution ==
This species was described from specimens collected at the island of Takano-Sima, Tateyama Bay, Japan.

== Description ==
The body of Anteaeolidiella takanosimensis is translucent white with orange linear markings.
