= Anteaeolidiella poshitra =

Scientific classification
- Kingdom: Animalia
- Phylum: Mollusca
- Class: Gastropoda
- Order: Nudibranchia
- Suborder: Aeolidacea
- Family: Aeolidiidae
- Genus: Anteaeolidiella
- Species: A. poshitra

Binomial name
- Anteaeolidiella poshitra Carmona, Bhave, Salunkhe, Pola, Gosliner & Cervera, 2014

Species of gastropod

Anteaeolidiella poshitra is a species of sea slugs, an aeolid nudibranch. It is a marine gastropod mollusc in the family Aeolidiidae.

== Distribution ==
This species was described from specimens collected under coral rubble at Poshitra, Gujarat, India.

== Description ==
The body of Anteaeolidiella poshitra is translucent white, with a bracket-shaped orange mark on the front of the head. Behind the rhinophores is an orange diamond-shaped mark, and the pericardium is translucent with an orange circle. The rhinophores are orange with white tips, and the oral tentacles are translucent white with a hint of orange. Black eyes are visible through the skin just behind the bases of the rhinophores. The cerata are long and swollen and extend from the rear of the rhinophores to the tail leaving a bare zone over the back. The cerata contain orange digestive gland and have a white tip. The cerata are arranged in as many as 6 rows with as many as 6 cerata in the anterior rows and as few as 2 in the last rows. The animals were only 8 mm in length. Larger animals from the same location may be the same species.
