= Anteaeolidiella orientalis =

Scientific classification
- Kingdom: Animalia
- Phylum: Mollusca
- Class: Gastropoda
- Order: Nudibranchia
- Suborder: Aeolidacea
- Family: Aeolidiidae
- Genus: Anteaeolidiella
- Species: A. orientalis

Binomial name
- Anteaeolidiella orientalis (Bergh, 1888)

Synonyms
- Aeolidiella orientalis Bergh, 1888; Eolidina mannarensis Virabhadra-Rao & Alagarswami, 1960

Species of gastropod

Anteaeolidiella orientalis is a species of sea slug, an aeolid nudibranch. It is a marine gastropod mollusc in the family Aeolidiidae.

== Distribution ==
This species was described from a specimen collected at Noordwachter Island, northwest of Java, Indonesia. Eolidina mannarensis, described from Mandapam, Gulf of Mannar, India, is its junior synonym.

== Description ==
Anteaeolidiella orientalis has been synonymised with Anteaeolidiella indica in the past, but differs from that species in having white rhinophores with red or orange tips.
