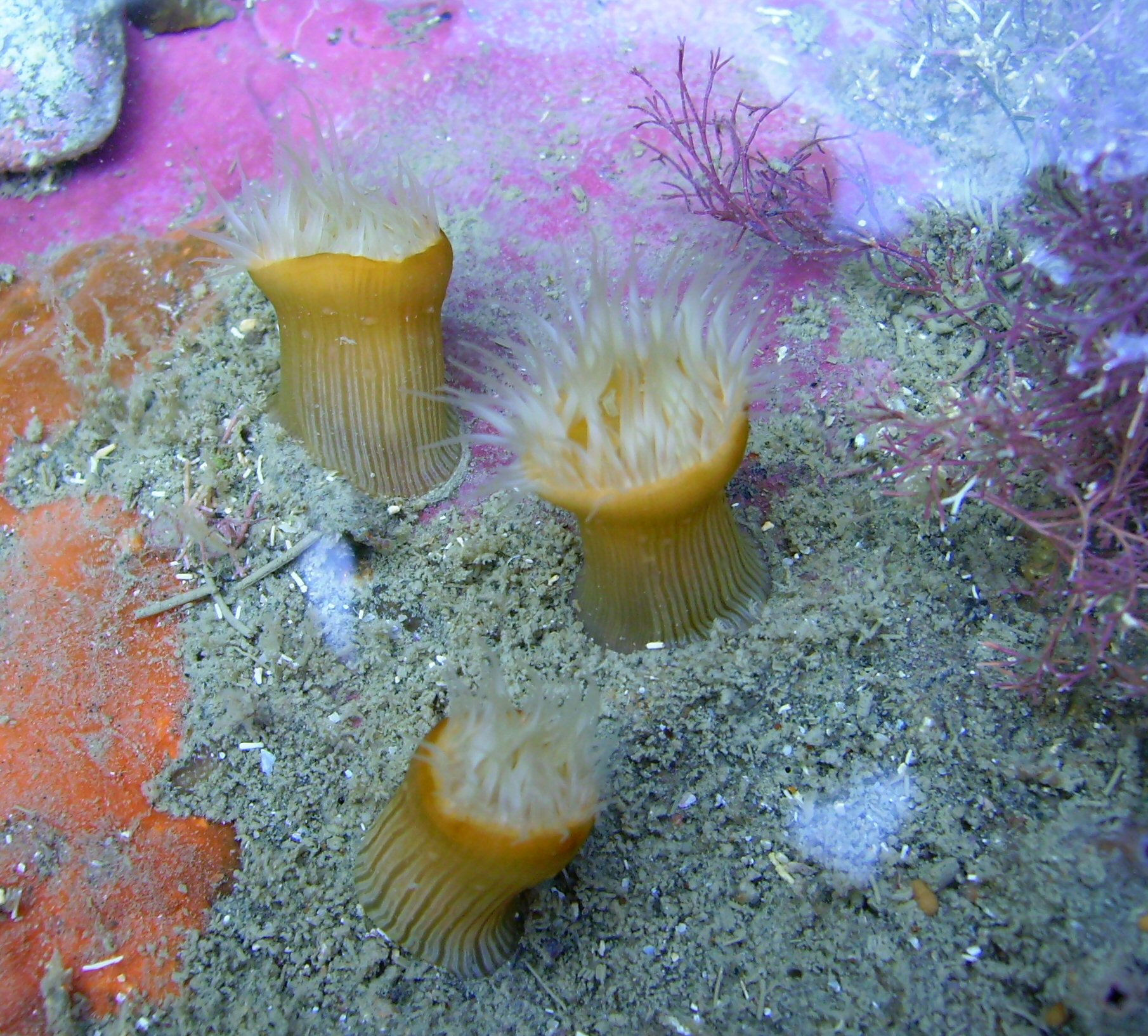

Scientific classification
- Kingdom: Animalia
- Phylum: Cnidaria
- Subphylum: Anthozoa
- Class: Hexacorallia
- Order: Actiniaria
- Family: Sagartiidae
- Genus: Anthothoe
- Species: A. albocincta

Binomial name
- Anthothoe albocincta (Hutton, 1879)

Synonyms
- Actinothoe albocincta (Hutton, 1879); Gregoria albocincta Hutton, 1879; Gregoria albocinctus Hutton, 1879; Sagartia albocincta (Hutton, 1879); Sagartia albo-cincta (Hutton, 1879)

= Anthothoe albocincta =

Species of sea anemone

Anthothoe albocincta, or white-striped anemone, is a species of sea anemone in the family Sagartiidae. It is native to the coasts of Australia and New Zealand.

== Description ==
This species grows to a maximum diameter of 30mm, varies in colour, but can usually be distinguished by its orange or green oral disc with distinct, short, white stripes on the column. It has many tentacles.

== Distribution ==
Anthothoe albocincta occurs in the waters of southeastern Australia, (Victoria, Tasmania, New South Wales) and New Zealand.

== Habitat ==
This species lives in the intertidal and subtidal zones, in rock pools on many types of substrate, usually rock, and sometimes sponges, algae, gastropod shells and ascidians. It is found at depths down to about 25 metres (82 ft).

== Behaviour ==
During high tide, this anemone is highly active, feeding on particles it captures. It is also able to defend itself by shooting stinging cells from openings located on the side of the column.

This anemone can reproduce both sexually and by cloning. In sexual reproduction, the gametes are liberated into the water column where fertilisation takes place. The fertilized egg develops into a planula larva which drifts with the plankton before settling and developing directly into another polyp. This allows for dispersal of the sea anemones over long distances.

Clonal reproduction takes place by longitudinal fission. Local populations consist of large numbers of cloned individuals with similar coloured oral discs and tentacles. Confirmation that they are clones can be gained by electrophoretic genotyping. It has been found that clones are found in agglomerations, sometimes narrowly separated from other agglomerations with the same genotype. There is no evidence that the clones are mobile through rafting.
