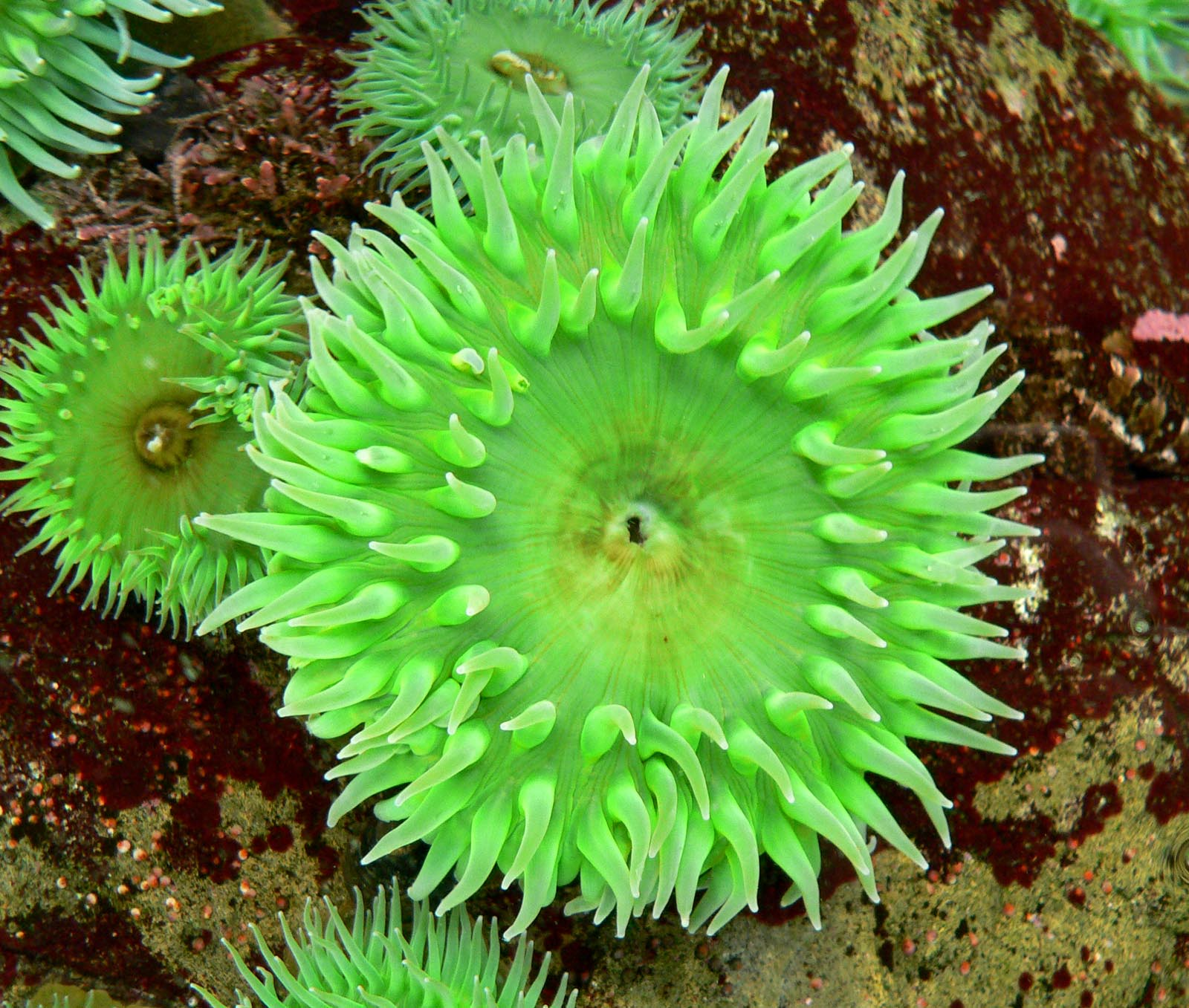
- Anthopleura xanthogrammica

Scientific classification
- Kingdom: Animalia
- Phylum: Cnidaria
- Subphylum: Anthozoa
- Class: Hexacorallia
- Order: Actiniaria
- Family: Actiniidae
- Genus: Anthopleura; Duchassaing de Fonbressin & Michelotti, 1860

Species
- See text

Synonyms
- Anthpleura

= Anthopleura =

Genus of sea anemones

Anthopleura is a genus of sea anemones, of the family Actiniidae.

== Etymology ==
Anthopleura is Greek; anthōs, flowers and pleura, ribs.

== Species ==
According to the World Register of Marine Species, this genus includes 49 species:

Image	Species
	Anthopleura africana (Carlgren, 1900)
	Anthopleura ambonensis (Kwietniewski, 1898)
	Anthopleura anjunae Den Hartog & Vennam, 1993
	Anthopleura anneae Carlgren, 1940
	Anthopleura artemisia (Pickering in Dana, 1846)
	Anthopleura asiatica Uchida & Muramatsu, 1958
	Anthopleura atodai Yanagi & Daly, 2004
	Anthopleura ballii Cocks, 1851
	Anthopleura biscayensis Fischer, 1874
	Anthopleura buddemeieri Fautin, 2005
	Anthopleura chinensis England, 1992
	Anthopleura dalyae González-Muñoz, Garese & Acuña, 2018
	Anthopleura dixoniana Haddon & Shackleton, 1893
	Anthopleura dowii Verrill, 1869
	Aggregating anemone (Anthopleura elegantissima) (Brandt, 1835)
	Anthopleura foxi Carlgren, 1927
	Anthopleura fuscoviridis Carlgren, 1949
	Anthopleura haddoni (Kwietniewski, 1898)
	Anthopleura handi Dunn, 1978
	Anthopleura hermaphroditica (Carlgren, 1899)
	Anthopleura incerta England, 1992
	Anthopleura inconspicua (Hutton, 1878)
	Anthopleura insignis Carlgren, 1940
	Anthopleura japonica Verrill, 1899
	Anthopleura kohli Carlgren, 1930
	Anthopleura krebsi Duchassaing & Michelotti, 1860
	Anthopleura kurogane Uchida & Muramatsu, 1958
	Anthopleura mariae Vassallo-Avalos, González-Muñoz, Acuña & Rivas, 2020
	Anthopleura mariscali Daly & Fautin, 2004
	Long-tentacled anemone (Anthopleura michaelseni) (Pax, 1920)
	Anthopleura minima (Stuckey & Walton, 1910)
	Anthopleura mortenseni Carlgren, 1941
	Anthopleura mortoni England, 1992
	Anthopleura nigrescens (Verrill, 1928)
	Anthopleura pallida Duchassaing & Michelotti, 1866
	Anthopleura panikkarii Parulekar, 1968
	Anthopleura qingdaoensis Pei, 1994
	Anthopleura radians Spano & Häussermann, 2017
	Anthopleura rosea (Stuckey & Walton, 1910)
	Anthopleura sanctaehelenae Carlgren, 1941
	Anthopleura sola Pearse & Francis, 2000
	Anthopleura stellula Hemprich & Ehrenberg in Ehrenberg, 1834
	Anthopleura stimpsonii Verrill, 1869
	Anthopleura texaensis Carlgren & Hedgpeth, 1952
	Anthopleura thallia Gosse, 1854
	Anthopleura variata Vassallo-Avalos, González-Muñoz, Morrone, Acuña, Durán-Fuentes, Stampar, Solís-Marín, and Rivas 2024
	Anthopleura varioarmata Watzl, 1922
	Anthopleura waridi (Carlgren, 1900)
	Anthopleura xanthogrammica (Brandt, 1835)
