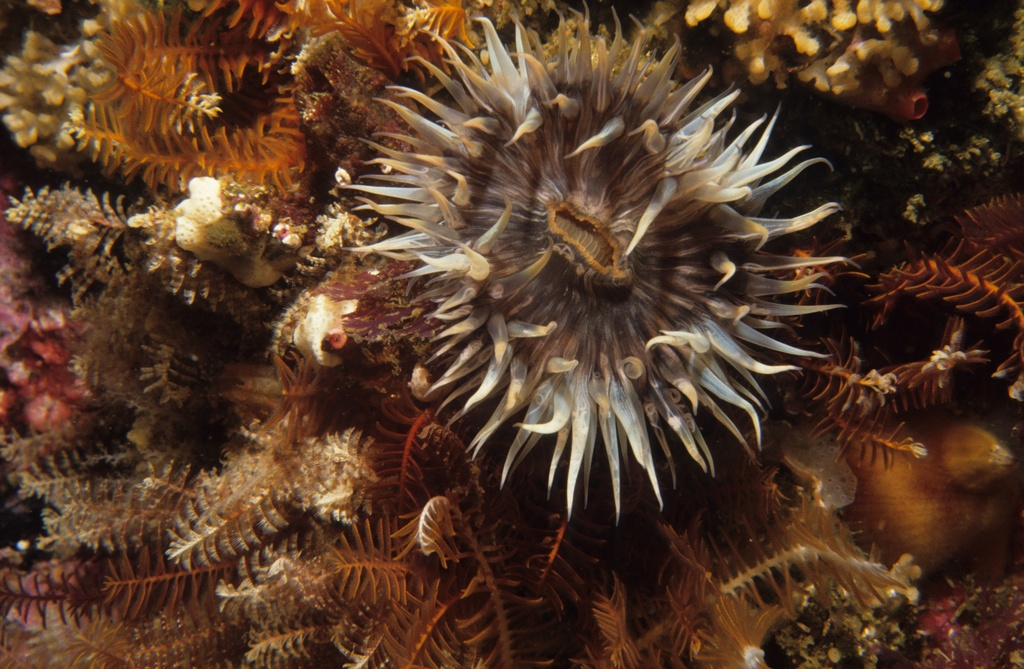
- Striped anemone (Anthothoe chilensis)

Scientific classification
- Kingdom: Animalia
- Phylum: Cnidaria
- Subphylum: Anthozoa
- Class: Hexacorallia
- Order: Actiniaria
- Family: Sagartiidae
- Genus: Anthothoe
- Species: A. chilensis

Binomial name
- Anthothoe chilensis (Lesson, 1830)

Synonyms
- Actinia chilensis Lesson, 1830 (basionym); Actinia (Diplostephanus) chilensis Lesson, 1830; Actinothoe chilensis (Lesson, 1830); Antholoba chilensis; Dysactis chilensis; Nemactis chilensis Verrill; Sagartia chilensis (Lesson, 1830); Thoe chilensis (Lesson, 1830)

= Anthothoe chilensis =

Species of sea anemone

Anthothoe chilensis, or striped anemone, is a species of sea anemones in the family Sagartiidae.

== Description ==
Anthothoe chilensis is a small anemone of around 2 cm in diameter. It is vertically striped in pink, green or browns, though it may also be pale in colour.

== Distribution ==
This species is found off Chile, Brazil and Argentina in South America, around St. Helena and off the southern African coast from Luderitz to Richards Bay. It inhabits waters from the intertidal zone to 28m in depth.

== Ecology ==
Anthothoe chilensis shoots sticky defensive threads (acontia) through pores in its body wall when threatened. It has symbiotic bacteria living within its body which supplement its food supply by photosynthesis. Preyed upon by the nudibranch Anteaeolidiella cacaotica (recorded as syn. Anteaeolidiella foulisi).
