= Anteaeolidiella ireneae =

Scientific classification
- Kingdom: Animalia
- Phylum: Mollusca
- Class: Gastropoda
- Order: Nudibranchia
- Suborder: Aeolidacea
- Family: Aeolidiidae
- Genus: Anteaeolidiella
- Species: A. ireneae

Binomial name
- Anteaeolidiella ireneae Carmona, Bhave, Salunkhe, Pola, Gosliner & Cervera, 2014

Species of gastropod

Anteaeolidiella ireneae is a species of sea slugs, an aeolid nudibranch. It is a marine gastropod mollusc in the family Aeolidiidae.

== Distribution ==
This species was described from specimens collected under loose coral and sand in 15–20 m of water at Clipperton Island, East Pacific. It is found in Mexico, Costa Rica, and Panama.

== Description ==
The body of Anteaeolidiella ireneae is translucent white, with scattered orange pigment over the back. There is an irregular white line from the head extending between the rhinophores and spreading into a teardrop shape over the pericardium. This line continues as several diamond-shaped patches of white or pale yellow pigment along the midline. The rhinophores and the oral tentacles are orange with white tips. Black eyes are visible through the skin just behind the bases of the rhinophores. The cerata are long and cylindrical with rounded tips. They extend from the rear of the rhinophores to the tail and leave a bare zone over the back. The cerata are bright orange or dark grey, with a white band and a white tip. The cerata are arranged in as many as 36 rows with as many as 12 cerata in the anterior rows and as few as 4 in the last rows.
