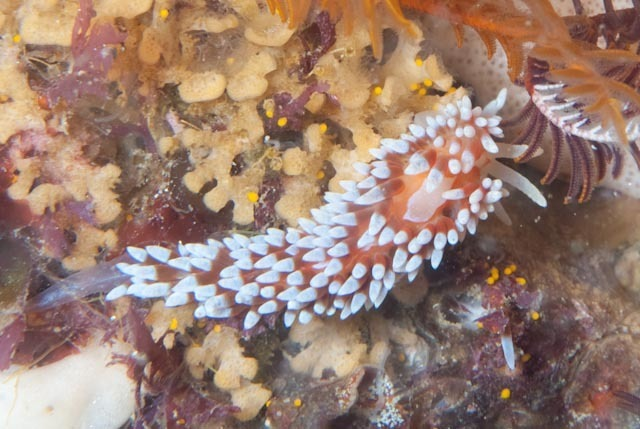

Scientific classification
- Kingdom: Animalia
- Phylum: Mollusca
- Class: Gastropoda
- Order: Nudibranchia
- Suborder: Aeolidacea
- Family: Aeolidiidae
- Genus: Anteaeolidiella
- Species: A. saldanhensis

Binomial name
- Anteaeolidiella saldanhensis (Barnard, 1927)

Synonyms
- Aeolidiella saldanhensis Barnard, 1927; Aeolidiella multicolor Macnae, 1954

= Anteaeolidiella saldanhensis =

Species of gastropod

Anteaeolidiella saldanhensis, is a species of sea slug, an aeolid nudibranch. It is a shell-less marine gastropod mollusc in the family Aeolidiidae.

== Distribution ==
This species is confined to the South African coast from Saldanha Bay to southern KwaZulu Natal. It is found from the intertidal zone to a depth of at least 10 m.

== Description ==
Anteaeolidiella saldanhensis can grow as large as 35 mm in total length. It is a slender-bodied nudibranch with orange markings on its notum. Its rhinophores and oral tentacles are white-tipped. Its cerata are short and fat, and are grey or pink with pale tips.

== Ecology ==
This nudibranch feeds on the striped anemone Anthothoe chilensis. Its egg mass is a simple spiral consisting of three complete whorls.
