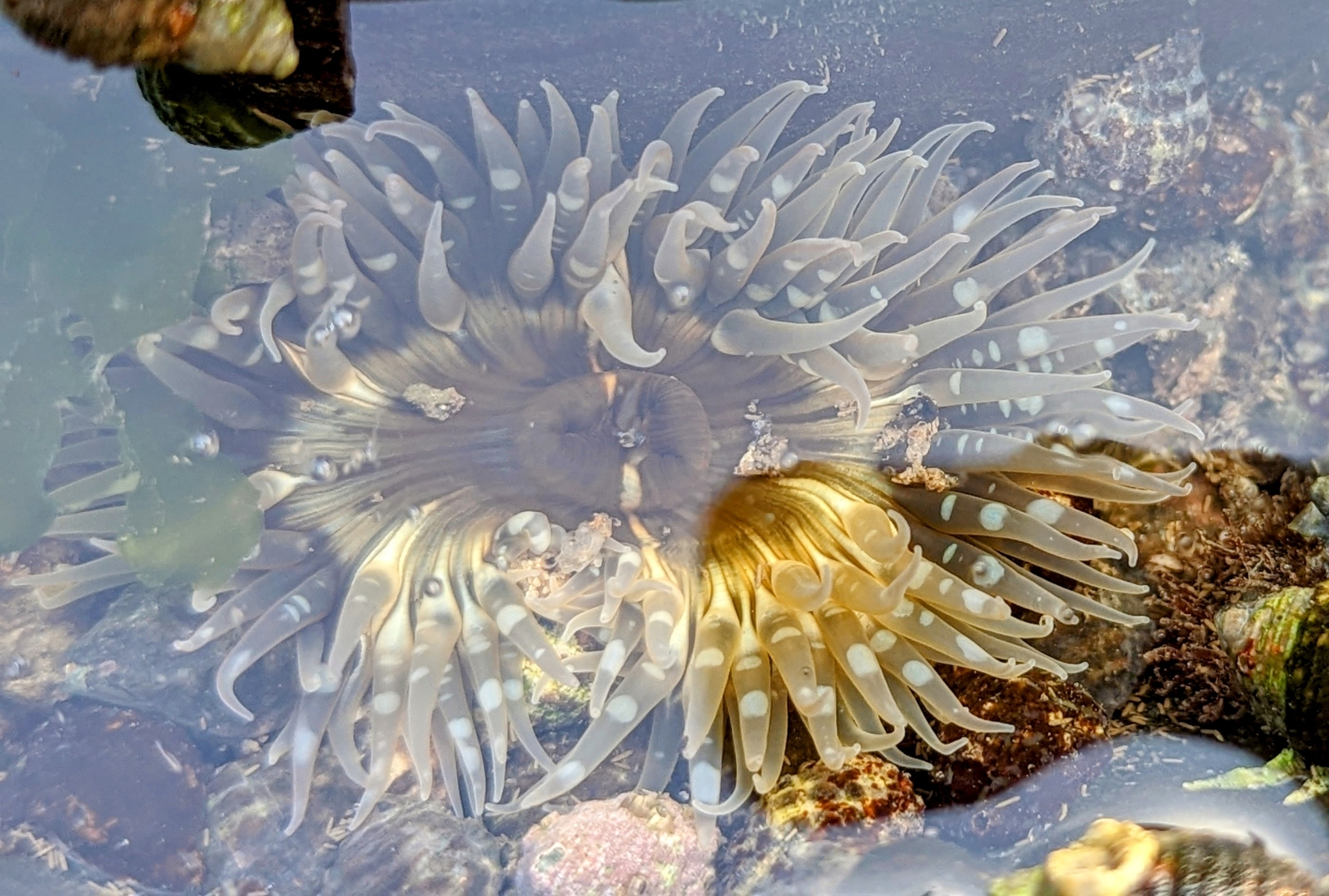

Scientific classification
- Domain: Eukaryota
- Kingdom: Animalia
- Phylum: Cnidaria
- Class: Hexacorallia
- Order: Actiniaria
- Family: Actiniidae
- Genus: Anthopleura
- Species: A. anjunae

Binomial name
- Anthopleura anjunae Den Hartog & Vennam, 1993

Synonyms
- Anthopleura midori

= Anthopleura anjunae =

Species of sea anemone

Anthopleura anjunae is a species of sea anemone. It is found in South and Southeast Asia.
