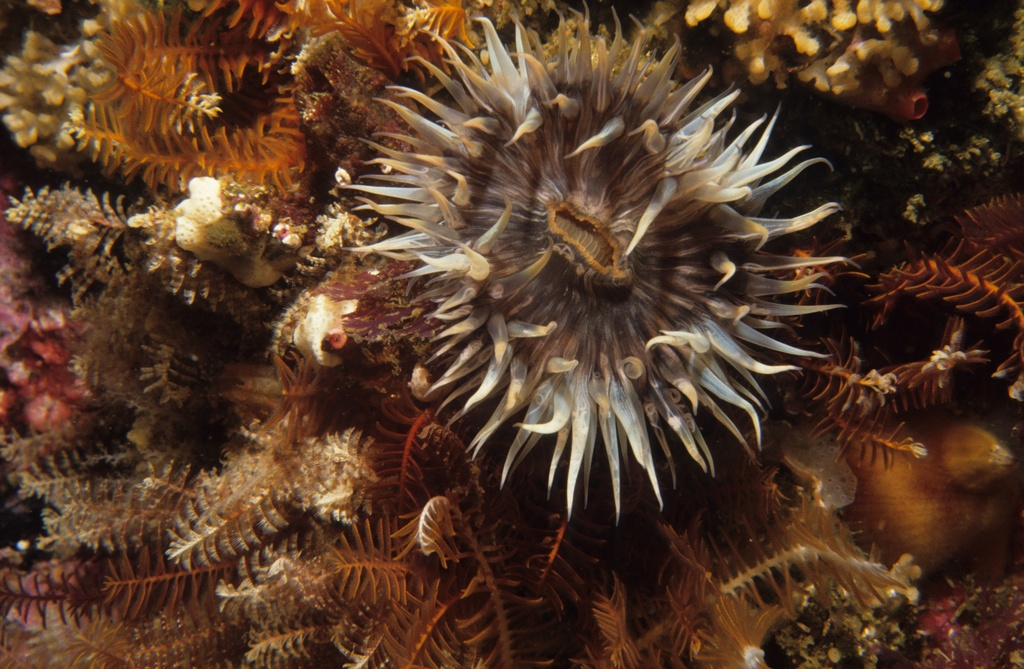
- Striped anemone (Anthothoe chilensis)

Scientific classification
- Kingdom: Animalia
- Phylum: Cnidaria
- Subphylum: Anthozoa
- Class: Hexacorallia
- Order: Actiniaria
- Family: Sagartiidae
- Genus: Anthothoe; Carlgren, 1938

Species
- See text

Synonyms
- Mitactis Haddon & Duerden, 1896; Parathoe Carlgren, 1928

= Anthothoe =

Genus of sea anemones

Anthothoe is a genus of sea anemones in the family Sagartiidae.

== Species ==
Species in the genus include:

- Anthothoe affinis (Johnson, 1861)
- Anthothoe albens (Stuckey, 1909)
- Anthothoe albocincta (Hutton, 1879)
- Anthothoe australiae (Haddon & Duerden, 1896)
- Anthothoe australiensis Carlgren, 1950
- Anthothoe chilensis (Lesson, 1830)
- Anthothoe neozelanica (Carlgren, 1924)
- Anthothoe olivacea (Hemprich & Ehrenberg in Ehrenberg, 1834)
- Anthothoe panamensis Carlgren, 1951
- Anthothoe similis (Haddon & Duerden, 1896)
- Anthothoe stimpsonii (Verrill, 1870)
- Anthothoe vagrans (Stuckey, 1909)
- Anthothoe vincentina (Pax, 1922)
