= Anthopleura thallia =

Scientific classification
- Kingdom: Animalia
- Phylum: Cnidaria
- Subphylum: Anthozoa
- Class: Hexacorallia
- Order: Actiniaria
- Family: Actiniidae
- Genus: Anthopleura
- Species: A. thallia

Binomial name
- Anthopleura thallia (Gosse, 1854)

Species of sea anemone

Anthopleura thallia, commonly known as the glaucous pimplet, is a species of sea anemone in the family Actiniidae. It is found in shallow water in the northeastern Atlantic Ocean and the Mediterranean Sea.

== Description ==
Anthopleura thallia typically has a base about 10 mm (0.4 in) wide, a column about 15 mm (0.6 in) long and an oral disc 10 mm (0.4 in) wide. The lower part of the column has many sticky, cup-shaped warts in about 36 vertical rows. The margin of the column has several outgrowths of the body-wall known as acrorhagi, which are well armed with cnidocytes (stinging cells). On the oral disc there are two to four whorls of thirty to sixty tapering, blunt-tipped, fully retractile tentacles and a central mouth. The column is green, yellow or brown, the warts are red to brown and darker than the column. The oral disc is green to brown, paler near the mouth, with chevron-shaped markings, and the tentacles are the same colour as the column and sometimes barred with white.

== Distribution and habitat ==
Anthopleura thallia is found on the coasts of Western Europe and in the Mediterranean Sea. It is an uncommon species and its range includes the Isle of Man, Ireland, the southwest of England, Normandy, Brittany, Galicia, Madeira, the Canary Islands and the Mediterranean Sea. Reports of its presence in Israel, the Red Sea, the Gulf of Aqaba and Croatia are probably incorrect. It is found on rocky coasts with vigorous wave action, from the intertidal zone down to depths of about 25 metres (82 ft). The column is often buried in sand or concealed in a crevice, or may occur among mussels or under gravel, and usually has sedimentary particles or debris sticking to it. This fact helps to distinguish this species from the closely related red speckled anemone (Anthopleura ballii) which has a non-adhesive column.

== Biology ==
Anthopleura thallia has a patchy distribution but is locally abundant. It is likely that it is clonal as many individuals are scarred, having undergone asexual reproduction by splitting longitudinally. No zooxanthellae are found in this species.
