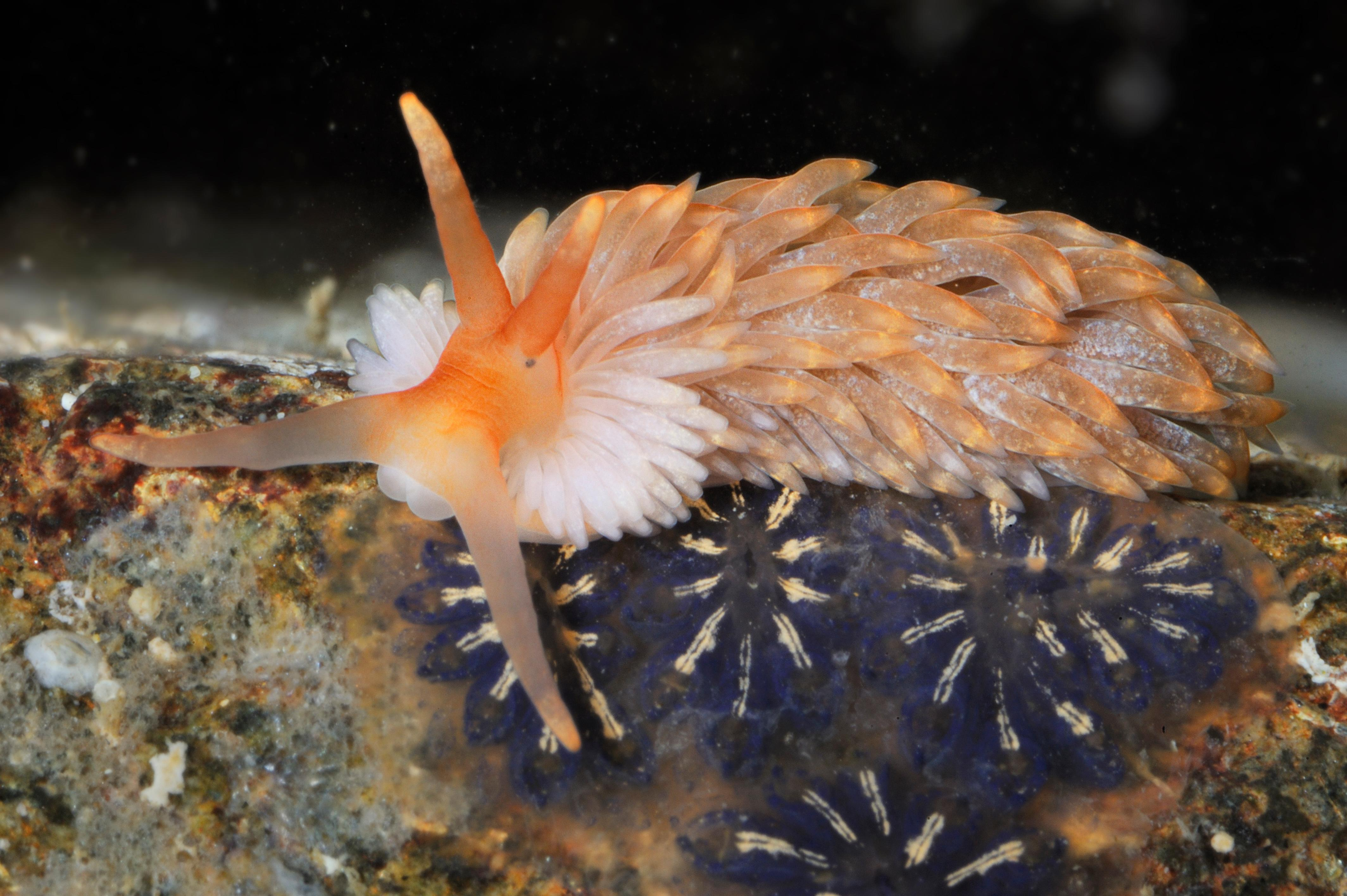

Scientific classification
- Domain: Eukaryota
- Kingdom: Animalia
- Phylum: Mollusca
- Class: Gastropoda
- Order: Nudibranchia
- Suborder: Cladobranchia
- Family: Aeolidiidae
- Genus: Aeolidiella
- Species: A. alderi

Binomial name
- Aeolidiella alderi (Cocks, 1852)

Synonyms
- Aeolidiella soemmeringii Bergh, 1882 (name suppressed under ICZN Opinion 1315 [1985]); Aeolidiella soemmeringii var. mediterranea Bergh, 1885; Eolidia soemmeringii Leuckart, 1828 (invalid: placed on the Official Index by ICZN Opinion 1315); Eolis alderi Cocks, 1852 (original combination)

= Aeolidiella alderi =

Species of gastropod

Aeolidiella alderi is a species of sea slug, an aeolid nudibranch in the family Aeolidiidae. It is native to northwestern Europe where it occurs in the intertidal zone. It is a predator and feeds on sea anemones.

== Description ==
This is a small nudibranch that can reach a length of 37 mm (1.5 in). The body shape is flattened and broad, but not as wide as Aeolidia papillosa and Aeolidia filomenae. The pair of oral tentacles on the head are longer than the rhinophores. The dorsal surface of the body has up to 16 oblique rows of cerata on either side. These are outgrowths of the body wall that increase the area available for respiration, and contain extensions of the gut, so vary in colour according to the animal's diet. The first row of cerata have reduced digestive gland extensions and are white, forming a collar. The cerata are tipped with cnidosacs containing stinging cells, derived from the sea anemones that the nudibranch has eaten and which pass unmetabolized through its body.

== Distribution ==
The species was described from England. It was also recorded from the North Atlantic Ocean, off Ireland, the North Sea and the Mediterranean Sea. It is a shallow water species and occurs in the intertidal zone, under boulders and in rock pools.

== Ecology ==
A carnivore, A. alderi feeds on sea anemones. It seems to have a preference for Cereus pedunculatus, Diadumene cincta and species of Sagartia such as Sagartia elegans and Sagartia troglodytes. It also feeds on Metridium dianthus, Sagartiogeton laceratus, Paractinia striata, Actinothoe sphyrodeta Aiptasia mutabilis, Anemonia viridis and Aulactinia verrucosa. The rhinophores are sensory structures and are able to analyse the chemicals dissolved in the water around the sea slug, enabling it to detect its prey. Sea anemones are avoided by many predators because of their defensive stinging cells. The sea slug approaches a sea anemone with the greatest caution, gradually inching towards it, and extending the cerata that form the collar to two or three times their normal length. When close enough (fractions of a millimetre), the cnidosacs in the collar cerata are discharged into the column of the anemone, poisoning the tissues and causing necrosis. The sea slug can then feed.

Reproduction is hermaphroditic. The eggs are large and are laid in a spiral string of mucus on the substrate. Development is direct, without any larval stage, the young crawling away after hatching. The juveniles have no cerata at first, and these develop as the animal grows. Reproduction seems to take place all year round, and the young reach maturity after several months of growth.

== Etymology ==
The name honours Joshua Alder.
