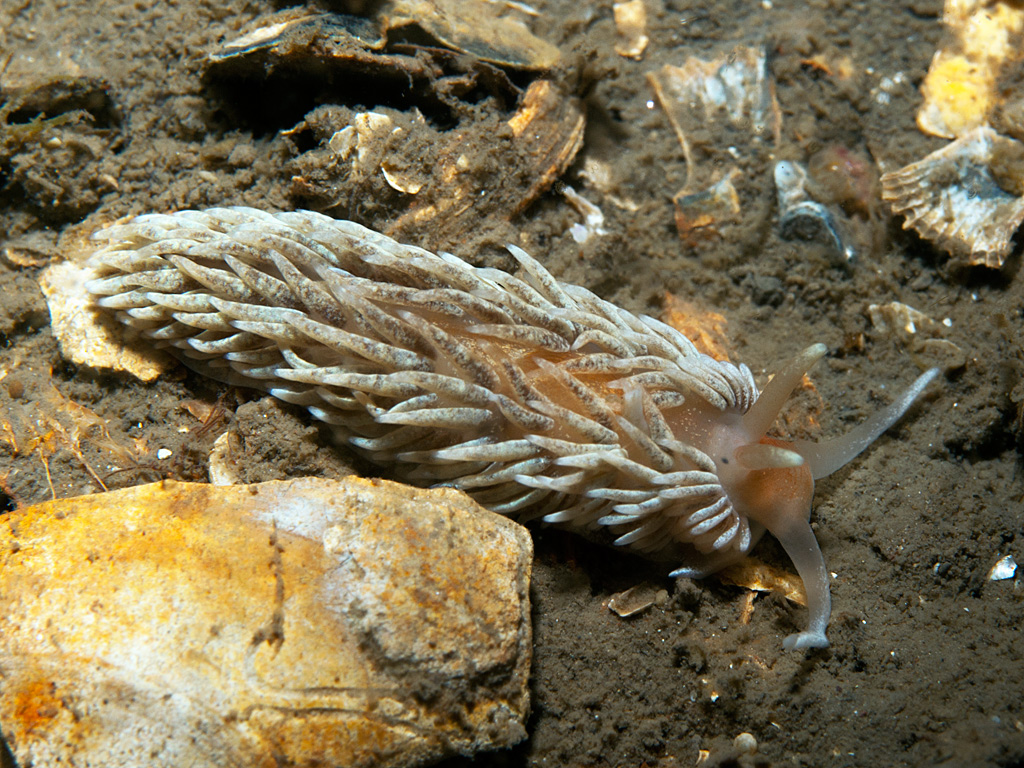
- The nudibranch Aeolidiella glauca, Strangford Lough, Irish Sea.

Scientific classification
- Kingdom: Animalia
- Phylum: Mollusca
- Class: Gastropoda
- Order: Nudibranchia
- Suborder: Aeolidacea
- Family: Aeolidiidae
- Genus: Aeolidiella
- Species: A. glauca

Binomial name
- Aeolidiella glauca (Alder & Hancock, 1845)

Synonyms
- Eolidina paradoxum de Quatrefages, 1843 (dubious synonym); Eolis angulata Alder & Hancock, 1844 (dubious synonym); Eolis glauca Alder & Hancock, 1845 (original combination); Eolis pallidula Lafont, 1871

= Aeolidiella glauca =

Species of gastropod

Aeolidiella glauca is a species of sea slug, an aeolid nudibranch in the family Aeolidiidae.

== Description ==
The body of this nudibranch attains a length of 45 mm. It is orange-brown in colour with extensive fawn or light brown surface pigment both on the dorsum and in a rim around the edge of the foot. The cerata are covered with dense flecks of fawn-coloured pigment. The outer half of the oral tentacles and rhinophores are similarly pigmented.

The body is the host of the ectoparasitic copepods Doridicola agilis Leydig, 1853 and Splanchnotrophus angulatus Hecht, 1893.

== Distribution ==
This species was described from Berry Head, Torbay, England. It has subsequently been reported from Norway, Great Britain, Ireland, Denmark, and the Atlantic coast of France south to Arcachon Bay.
