= Anthopleura hermaphroditica =

Scientific classification
- Domain: Eukaryota
- Kingdom: Animalia
- Phylum: Cnidaria
- Class: Hexacorallia
- Order: Actiniaria
- Family: Actiniidae
- Genus: Anthopleura
- Species: A. hermaphroditica

Binomial name
- Anthopleura hermaphroditica (Carlgren, 1899)

Synonyms
- Anthopleura areoradiata; Anthopleura aureoradiata (Stuckey, 1909); Anthopleura aureo-radiata (Stuckey, 1909); Anthopleura hermafroditica; Bunodes aureoradiata Stuckey, 1909; Bunodes hermafroditica; Cribrina hermaphroditica (Carlgren, 1899)

Species of sea anemone

Anthopleura hermaphroditica, also known as the small brown sea anemone, is a small anemone about 10 mm wide in diameter and very brown in colour. It is native to the waters around Chile and New Zealand. The brownish tinge of its outer surface makes it much harder to distinguish and find unlike some of the other sea anemones. This particular class of anemone can be seen under water as a small brown ring in soft fine sediment and slightly submerged.

This brown anemone has quite a high tolerance to changes in salinity and to a high concentration of organic matter in the water.

== Feeding ==
The small brown anemone feeds on plankton and small animals.

== Habitat ==
The small brown anemone is distributed throughout estuaries in current-free areas. They all usually found attached to cockles who with they form a commensal relationship as the anemone gets protection and the cockle becomes more camouflaged and so can hide better from predators such as the mud flat whelk (Cominella glandiformis) or sea gulls.

== Reproduction ==
Fertilization is external and the zygote develops into a pear-shaped planula which attaches to rocks or solid substrate and develops into a young adult.
