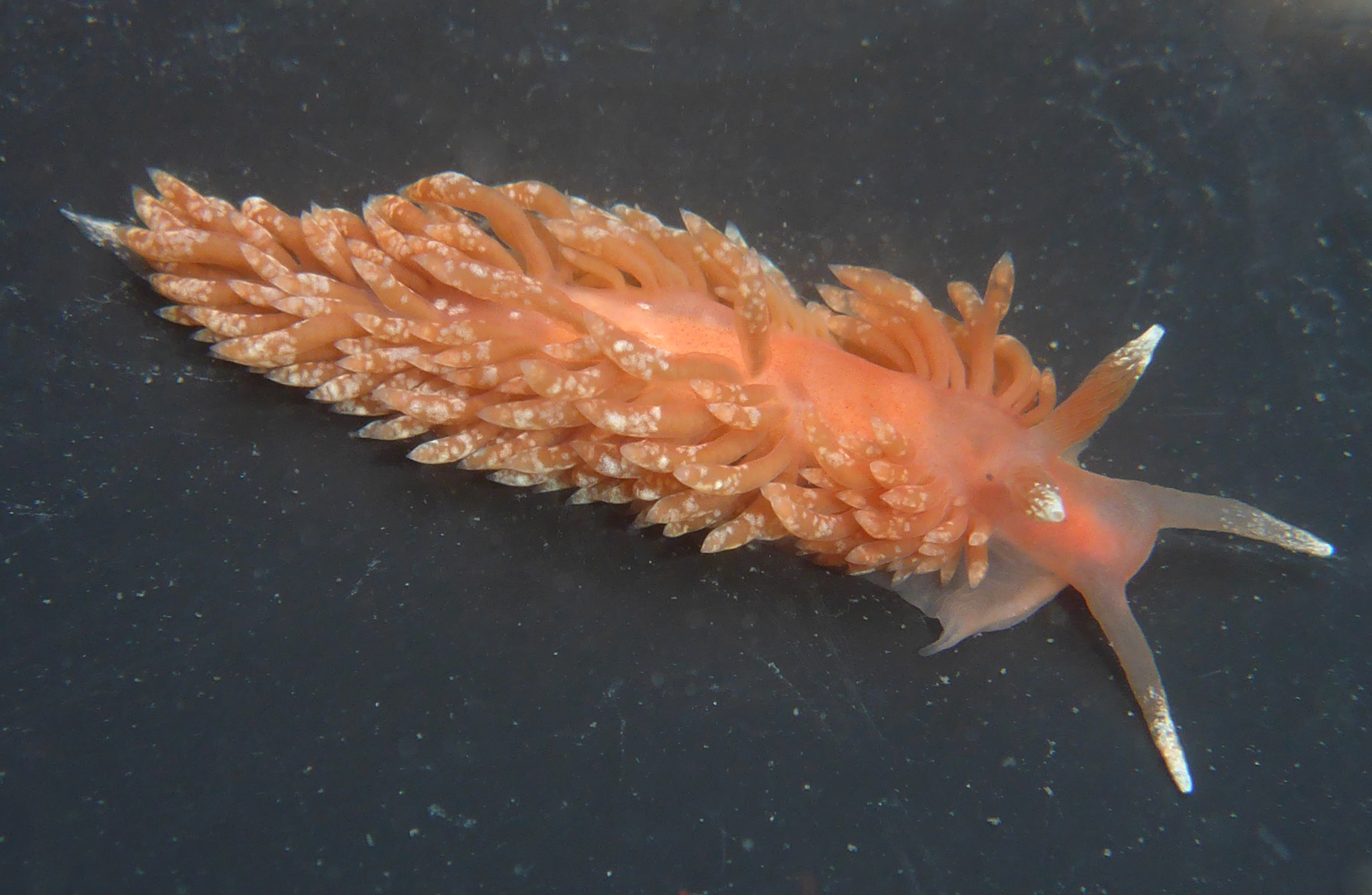
- Anteaeolidiella chromosoma

Scientific classification
- Kingdom: Animalia
- Phylum: Mollusca
- Class: Gastropoda
- Order: Nudibranchia
- Suborder: Aeolidacea
- Family: Aeolidiidae
- Genus: Anteaeolidiella; M. C. Miller, 2001

Type species
- Aeolidiella indica Bergh, 1888

= Anteaeolidiella =

Genus of gastropods

Anteaeolidiella is a genus of sea slugs, aeolid nudibranchs in the family Aeolidiidae.

== Taxonomic history ==
Miller created this genus in 2001 based on specimens from New Zealand which he identified as Aeolidiella indica, which was thought to be a cosmopolitan species since Gosliner and Griffiths synonymised several species in 1981. A study published in 2014 based on molecular characters reversed most of these synonymies and described three new species.

== Zoogeography ==
The genus Anteaeolidiella has a worldwide distribution in tropical and warm temperate waters. Three species are known from the East Pacific; Anteaeolidiella ireneae, Anteaeolidiella chromosoma and Anteaeolidiella oliviae. Three species are found in the West Pacific; Anteaeolidiella takanosimensis, Japan, Anteaeolidiella fijensis, Fiji and Anteaeolidiella cacaotica, Australia. The Indian Ocean has Anteaeolidiella indica, Mauritius, Anteaeolidiella poshitra, India, Anteaeolidiella orientalis, Java and India and Anteaeolidiella saldanhensis, South Africa. In the Atlantic Ocean one species has been described; Anteaeolidiella lurana, from Brazil, the Caribbean Sea, the Mediterranean Sea and this species also occurs in Australia and New Zealand.

== Species ==
Species in the genus Anteaeolidiella include:

- Anteaeolidiella cacaotica (Stimpson, 1855)
- Anteaeolidiella chromosoma (Cockerell & Eliot, 1905)
- Anteaeolidiella decorus S.-Q. Zhang & S.-P. Zhang, 2023
- Anteaeolidiella fijensis Carmona, Bhave, Salunkhe, Pola, Gosliner & Cervera, 2014
- Anteaeolidiella indica (Bergh, 1888)
- Anteaeolidiella ireneae Carmona, Bhave, Salunkhe, Pola, Gosliner & Cervera, 2014
- Anteaeolidiella lurana (Marcus & Marcus, 1967)
- Anteaeolidiella oliviae (MacFarland, 1966)
- Anteaeolidiella orientalis (Bergh, 1888)
- Anteaeolidiella poshitra Carmona, Bhave, Salunkhe, Pola, Gosliner & Cervera, 2014
- Anteaeolidiella saldanhensis (Barnard, 1927)
- Anteaeolidiella takanosimensis (Baba, 1930)

Synonyms

- Anteaeolidiella benteva (Er. Marcus, 1958): synonym of Berghia benteva (Er. Marcus, 1958)
- Anteaeolidiella foulisi (Angas, 1864): synonym of Anteaeolidiella cacaotica (W. Stimpson, 1855)
