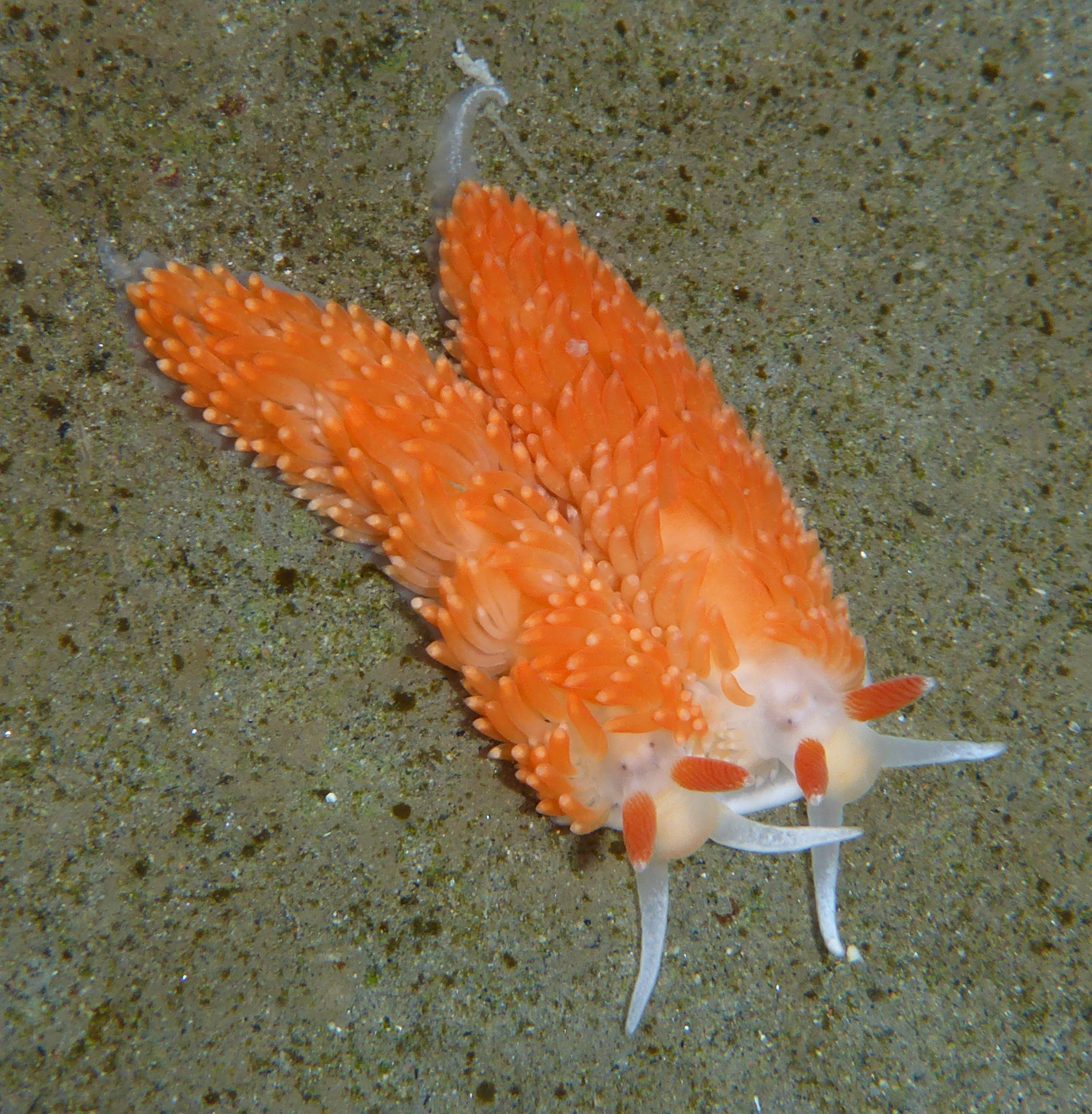
- Anteaeolidiella oliviae from Pillar Point, California

Scientific classification
- Kingdom: Animalia
- Phylum: Mollusca
- Class: Gastropoda
- Order: Nudibranchia
- Suborder: Aeolidacea
- Family: Aeolidiidae
- Genus: Anteaeolidiella
- Species: A. oliviae

Binomial name
- Anteaeolidiella oliviae (MacFarland, 1966)

Synonyms
- Aeolidiella oliviae MacFarland, 1966

= Anteaeolidiella oliviae =

Species of gastropod

Anteaeolidiella oliviae, is a species of sea slug, an aeolid nudibranch. It is a marine gastropod mollusc in the family Aeolidiidae.

== Distribution ==
This species was described from specimens collected at San Diego, California. Its distribution is apparently confined to California.

== Description ==
The body of Anteaeolidiella oliviae is translucent white with cream coloration on the back. There is sometimes an orange blotch on the head and another over the pericardium. The rhinophores have diagonal lamellae and are bright orange with white tips. The oral tentacles are mostly bright opaque white. The cerata are orange with white tips. Maximum size about 20 mm.

== Ecology ==
This species feeds on sea anemones. It is probably mostly nocturnal in its habits.
