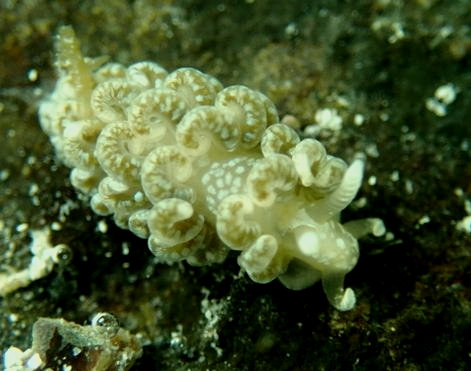
- Brazilian aeolid nudibranch (Spurilla braziliana)

Scientific classification
- Kingdom: Animalia
- Phylum: Mollusca
- Class: Gastropoda
- Order: Nudibranchia
- Suborder: Aeolidacea
- Family: Aeolidiidae
- Genus: Spurilla
- Species: S. braziliana

Binomial name
- Spurilla braziliana MacFarland, 1909

Synonyms
- Aeolidiella albopunctata G.-Y. Lin, 1992 junior subjective synonym; Eolidina (Spurilla) gabriellae Vannucci, 1952; Spurilla gabriellae (Vannucci, 1952)

= Spurilla braziliana =

Species of gastropod

Spurilla braziliana is a species of sea slug, an aeolid nudibranch. It is a shell-less marine gastropod mollusc in the family Aeolidiidae.

== Distribution ==
This species was described from a single specimen collected at Alagoas, Brazil. It has also been reported from the Caribbean Sea, Florida, Mexico, Colombia, Cuba, Jamaica, Puerto Rico, and the northern part of the Magellanic Province. It has been identified from the Pacific Ocean including the Hawaiian Islands, the Pacific coast of Costa Rica, Peru, Japan, China, and Australia.

== Description ==
Spurilla braziliana have an elongated body that is round at the posterior end and tapers off at the anterior end. The dorsal and lateral sides of the body are covered in tentacle-looking structures called cerata. On the front of the head are separated paired appendages called pericardium. S. braziliana is variable in color, with this variation being correlated with age. Young S. braziliana are mostly creamy white. Adult individuals are tan with wide dots across their bodies. The cerata are darker brown and have white tips. Part of the nudibranch can also be orange. S. braziliana can reach around 25 mm long.
