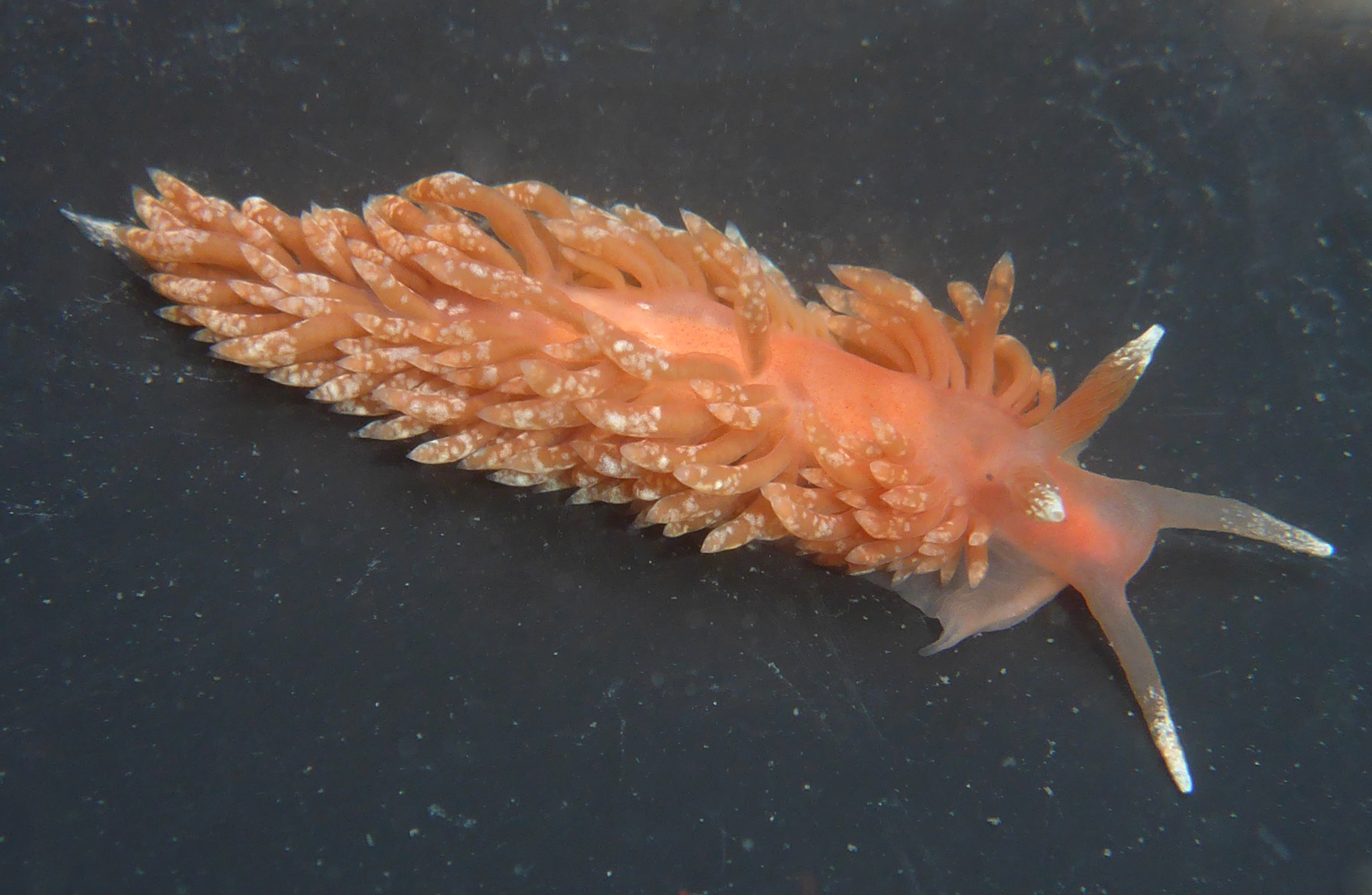

Scientific classification
- Kingdom: Animalia
- Phylum: Mollusca
- Class: Gastropoda
- Order: Nudibranchia
- Suborder: Aeolidacea
- Family: Aeolidiidae
- Genus: Anteaeolidiella
- Species: A. chromosoma

Binomial name
- Anteaeolidiella chromosoma (Cockerell & Eliot, 1905)

Synonyms
- Spurilla chromosoma Cockerell & Eliot, 1905

= Anteaeolidiella chromosoma =

Species of gastropod

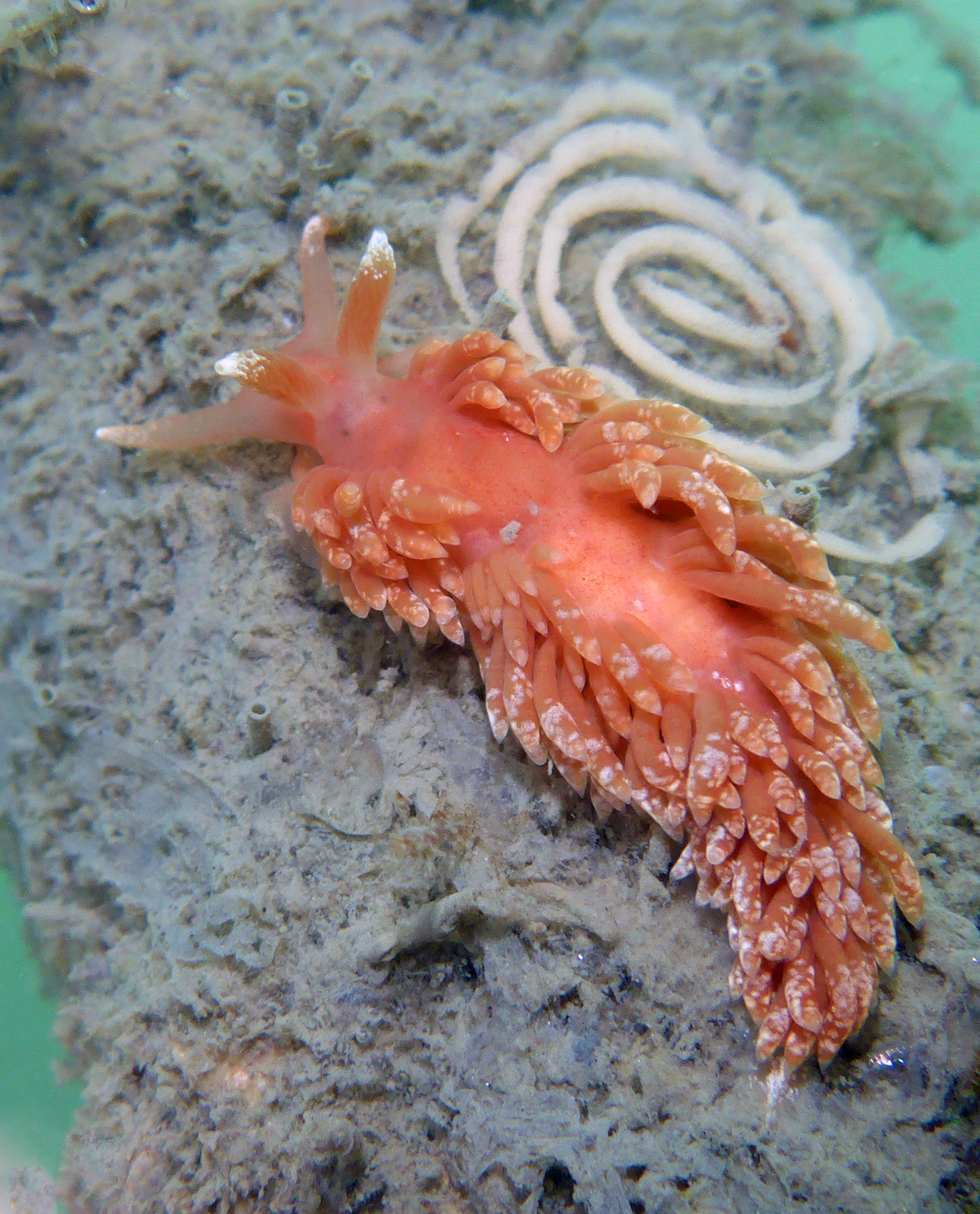
Anteaeolidiella chromosoma from San Francisco, California with egg spiral

Anteaeolidiella chromosoma, common name colorful aeolid, is a species of sea slug, an aeolid nudibranch. It is a shell-less marine gastropod mollusc in the family Aeolidiidae.

== Distribution ==
This species was described from specimens collected in the intertidal zone at Deadman's Island, San Pedro, California. It has also been reported from the Pacific coast of Costa Rica and Japan.

== Description ==
The body of Anteaeolidiella chromosoma is orange, with white spots scattered on the notum. Its rhinophores and oral tentacles are white-tipped.
