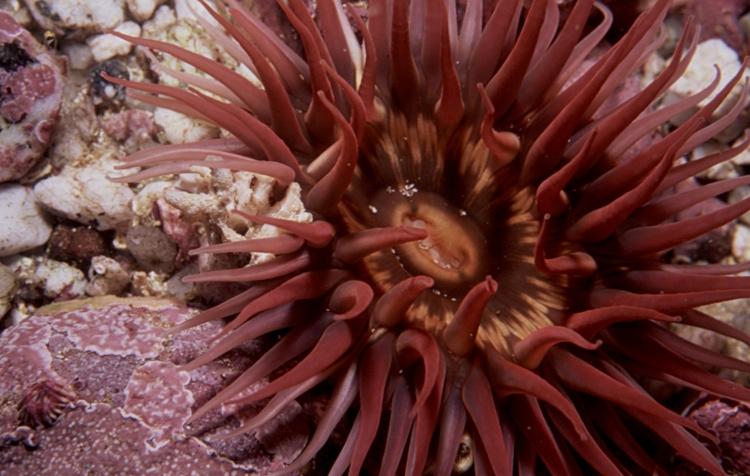

Scientific classification
- Kingdom: Animalia
- Phylum: Cnidaria
- Subphylum: Anthozoa
- Class: Hexacorallia
- Order: Actiniaria
- Family: Actiniidae
- Genus: Anthopleura
- Species: A. michaelseni

Binomial name
- Anthopleura michaelseni (Pax, 1920)

= Anthopleura michaelseni =

Species of sea anemone

Anthopleura michaelseni, commonly known as the long-tentacled anemone or crevice anemone, is a species of sea anemone in the family Actiniidae. It is native to very shallow water round the coasts of southern Africa between Lüderitz and Durban.

== Description ==
The long-tentacled anemone is a large anemone of up to 15 cm in diameter. Its column has large sticky pads to which sand and debris particles adhere. On the oral surface, dark stripes run from the mouth to the tentacles. It has 96 long tentacles with small round protrusions (spherules) at their base.

== Distribution ==
The long-tentacled anemone is found only around the southern African coast from Luderitz to Durban. It lives from the mid-shore and down to 10m in depth. The long-tentacled anemone is often found partially buried in sand in rock crevices.

== Ecology ==
Sea anemones lack the free-swimming medusal stage of the lifecycle of the typical Cnidarian; the long-tentacled anemone produces eggs and sperm, and the fertilized egg develops into a planula larva which drifts as part of the plankton before settling on the seabed and developing directly into a juvenile sea anemone.*
