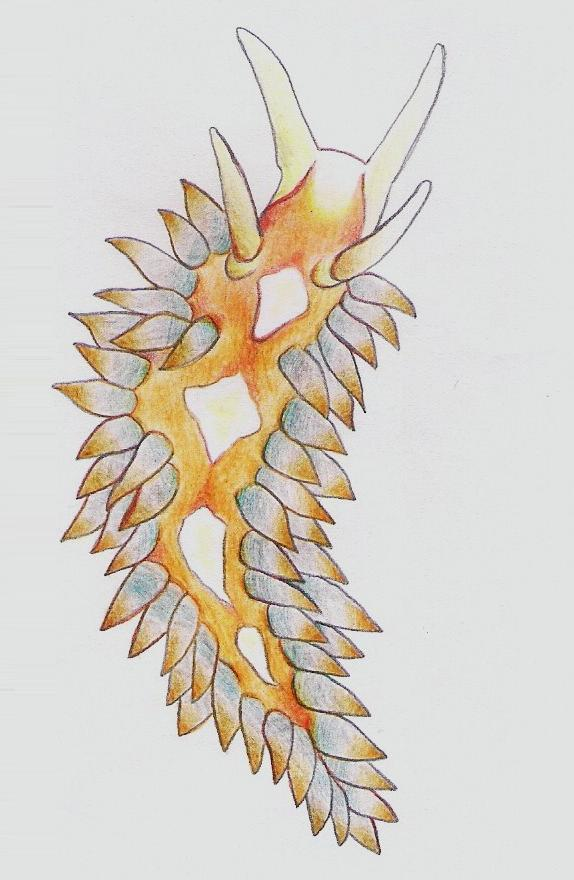

Scientific classification
- Kingdom: Animalia
- Phylum: Mollusca
- Class: Gastropoda
- Order: Nudibranchia
- Suborder: Aeolidacea
- Family: Aeolidiidae
- Genus: Anteaeolidiella
- Species: A. indica

Binomial name
- Anteaeolidiella indica (Bergh, 1888)

Synonyms
- Aeolidiella indica Bergh, 1888 – basionym

= Anteaeolidiella indica =

Species of gastropod

Anteaeolidiella indica is a species of sea slug, an aeolid nudibranch. It is a marine gastropod mollusc in the family Aeolidiidae.

== Distribution ==
This species was described from Mauritius. It has been erroneously reported as a widespread species occurring in the Mediterranean Sea; the Caribbean Sea, South Africa from Saldanha Bay to southern KwaZulu Natal and New Zealand. These records represent a complex of distinct species.

== Description ==
Bergh described this species based on Moebius' drawings and notes. The coloration of the living animal was depicted as white, yellow, and grey, including the oral tentacles and the rhinophores. Miller designated Aeolidiella indica as the type species of Anteaeolidiella, although his specimen did not match the coloration described by Bergh and was probably Anteaeolidiella lurana.

The maximum recorded body length is 40 mm.

== Habitat ==
Minimum recorded depth is 0 m. Maximum recorded depth is 0 m.
