= Spurilla faustina =

Scientific classification
- Kingdom: Animalia
- Phylum: Mollusca
- Class: Gastropoda
- Order: Nudibranchia
- Suborder: Aeolidacea
- Family: Aeolidiidae
- Genus: Spurilla
- Species: S. faustina

Binomial name
- Spurilla faustina (Bergh, 1900)

Synonyms
- Aeolidiella faustina Bergh, 1900

Species of gastropod

Spurilla faustina is a rare species of sea slug, an aeolid nudibranch, a marine gastropod mollusk in the family Aeolidiidae.
