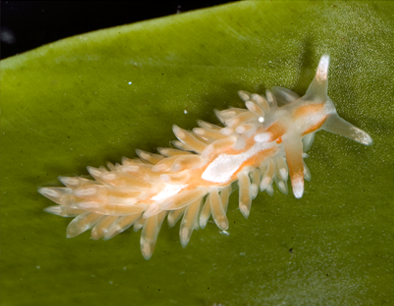

Scientific classification
- Kingdom: Animalia
- Phylum: Mollusca
- Class: Gastropoda
- Order: Nudibranchia
- Suborder: Aeolidacea
- Family: Aeolidiidae
- Genus: Anteaeolidiella
- Species: A. lurana

Binomial name
- Anteaeolidiella lurana (Er. Marcus & Ev. Marcus, 1967)

Synonyms
- Aeolidiella lurana Marcus & Marcus, 1967

= Anteaeolidiella lurana =

Species of gastropod

Anteaeolidiella lurana, is a species of sea slug, an aeolid nudibranch. It is a marine gastropod mollusc in the family Aeolidiidae.

== Distribution ==
This species was described from specimens collected at the island of Urubuqueçaba, Bay of Santos, Brazil. It appears to have a wide distribution in the Caribbean Sea, Mediterranean Sea, Canary Islands and Queensland, Australia.

== Description ==
The body of Anteaeolidiella lurana is translucent white. The front of the head has a bracket-shaped orange mark extending from the rhinophores to the base of the oral tentacles. There are a pair of faint orange lines on the sides of the head. Behind the rhinophores there is a diamond-shaped opaque white area, surrounded by orange pigment. A second orange diamond filled with white pigment outlines the pericardium. Two thin orange bands extend almost to the tail, forming teardrops or diamond marks every time they join. The rhinophores and the oral tentacles have the same colour as the background. The smooth rhinophores have orange pigment over the proximal two-thirds and white pigmentation on their tips. The conical oral tentacles have white pigmentation on their tips and may also have orange pigment over their dorsal surface. A pair of black eyes is visible at the base of the rhinophores. The ceratal epithelium is diffusely covered with orange pigment, interrupted by a white subapical band. The digestive gland inside the cerata is orange and terminates in a white cnidosac. The cerata are arranged in up to 23 rows and each row contains between two and nine cerata.
