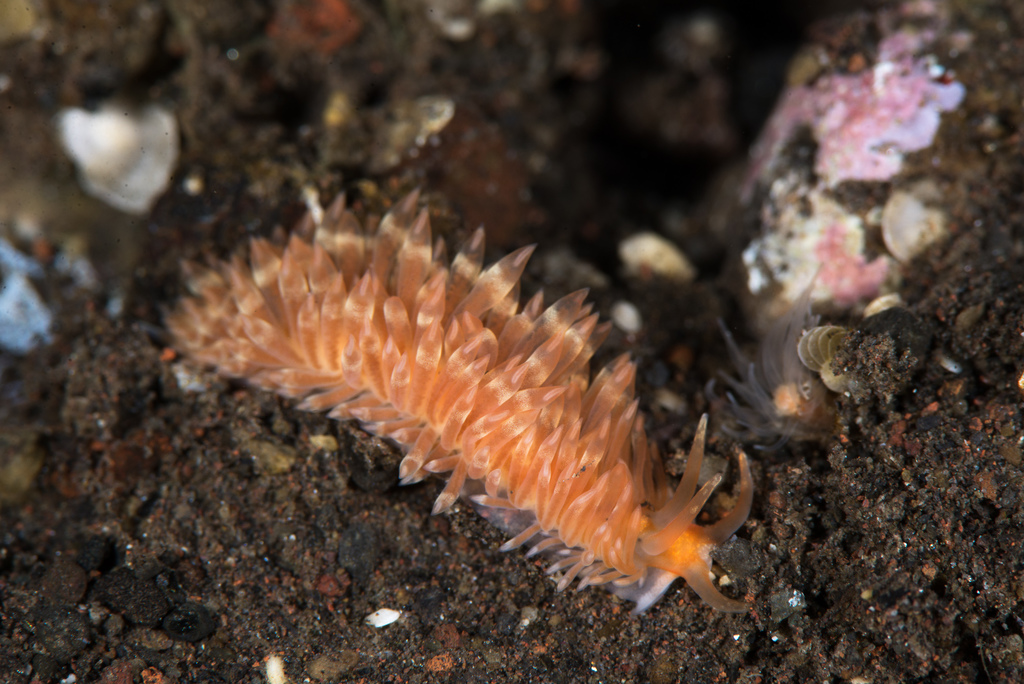

Scientific classification
- Kingdom: Animalia
- Phylum: Mollusca
- Class: Gastropoda
- Order: Nudibranchia
- Suborder: Aeolidacea
- Family: Aeolidiidae
- Genus: Anteaeolidiella
- Species: A. cacaotica

Binomial name
- Anteaeolidiella cacaotica (Stimpson, 1855)

Synonyms
- Anteaeolidiella foulisi (Angas, 1864)

= Anteaeolidiella cacaotica =

Species of gastropod

Anteaeolidiella cacaotica is a species of sea slug, an aeolid nudibranch. It is a shell-less marine gastropod mollusc in the family Aeolidiidae.

== Distribution ==
This species was described from Port Jackson, Australia. It has been reported from Japan, the Line Islands, and New Caledonia.

== Description ==
The body of Anteaeolidiella cacaotica is orange, with a series of white, teardrop-shaped markings on the midline of its notum. Its rhinophores and oral tentacles are white-tipped.
