= List of sea anemone families =

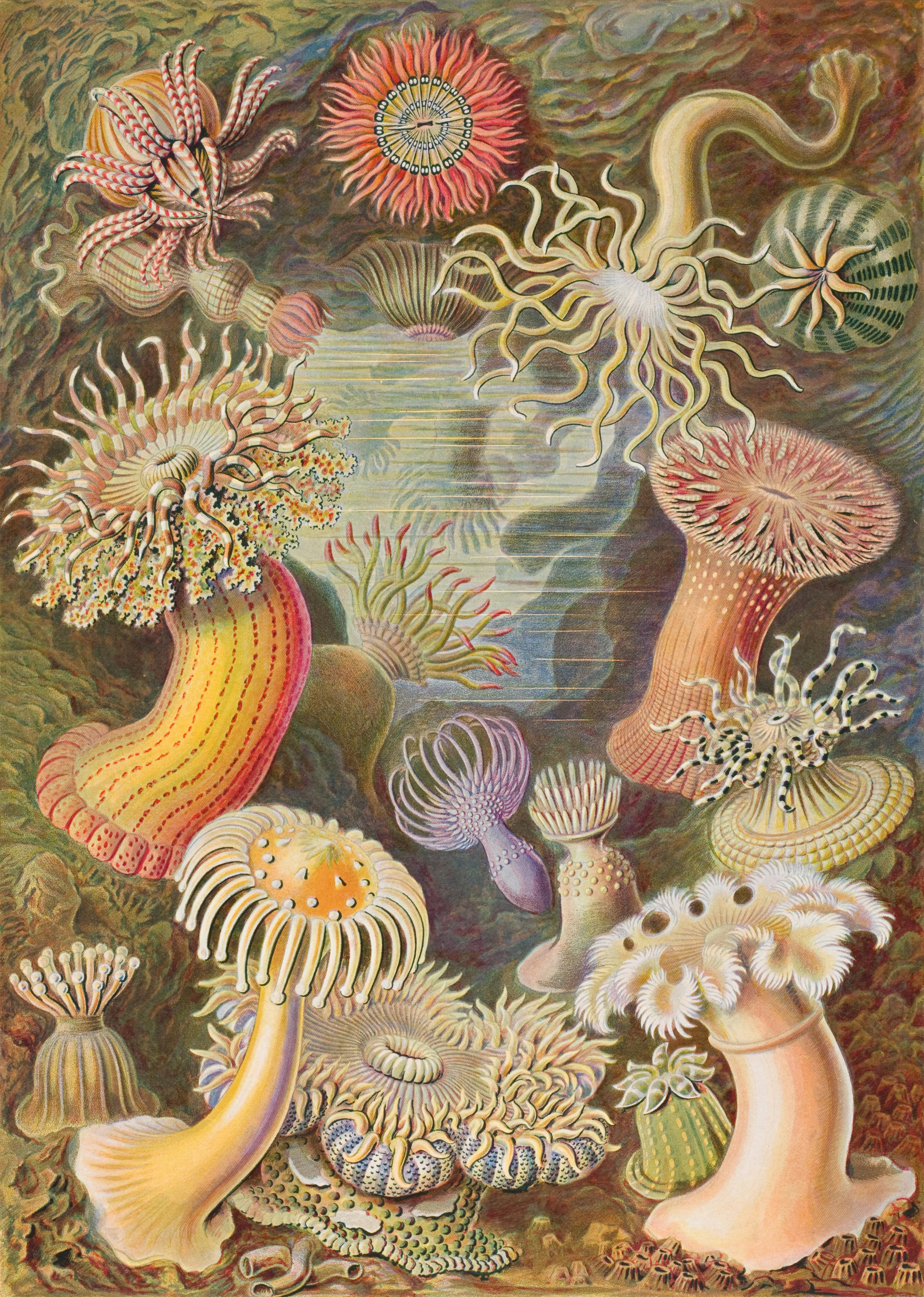
Color plate of "Actiniae" (an old term for Actiniaria) from Ernst Haeckel's Kunstformen der Natur (1904).

Actiniaria form an order of animals in the class Anthozoa that includes sea anemones.

== Taxonomy ==
Rodriguez et al. proposed a new classification for the Actiniaria based on extensive DNA results.

Suborders, Superfamilies and Families included in Actiniaria are:

- Suborder Anenthemonae
  - Superfamily Edwardsioidea
    - Family Edwardsiidae
  - Superfamily Actinernoidea
    - Family Actinernidae
    - Family Halcuriidae
- Suborder Enthemonae
  - Superfamily Actinostoloidea
    - Family Actinostolidae
    - Family Halcampulactidae
  - Superfamily Actinioidea
    - Family Actiniidae
    - Family Actinodendridae
    - Family Andresiidae
    - Family Capneidae
    - Family Condylanthidae
    - Family Haloclavidae
    - Family Homostichanthidae
    - Family Iosactinidae
    - Family Limnactiniidae
    - Family Liponematidae
    - Family Minyadidae
    - Family Oractinidae
    - Family Phymanthidae
    - Family Preactiniidae
    - Family Ptychodactinidae
    - Family Stichodactylidae
    - Family Thalassianthidae
  - Superfamily Metridioidea
    - Family Acontiophoridae
    - Family Actinoscyphiidae
    - Family Aiptasiidae
    - Family Aiptasiomorphidae
    - Family Aliciidae
    - Family Amphianthidae
    - Family Andvakiidae
    - Family Antipodactinidae
    - Family Bathyphelliidae
    - Family Boloceroididae
    - Family Diadumenidae
    - Family Exocoelactinidae
    - Family Gonactiniidae
    - Family Halcampidae
    - Family Haliactinidae
    - Family Haliplanellidae
    - Family Hormathiidae
    - Family Isanthidae
    - Family Kadosactinidae
    - Family Metridiidae
    - Family Mimetridiidae
    - Family Nemanthidae
    - Family Nevadneidae
    - Family Octineonidae
    - Family Ostiactinidae
    - Family Phelliidae
    - Family Ramireziidae
    - Family Sagartiidae
    - Family Sagartiomorphidae

The older classification of the Actiniaria according to Calgren is as follows:

- Suborder Endocoelantheae
  - Family Actinernidae
  - Family Halcuriidae
- Suborder Nyantheae
  - Infraorder Athenaria
    - Family Andresiidae
    - Family Andwakiidae
    - Family Edwardsiidae
    - Family Galatheanthemidae
    - Family Halcampidae
    - Family Halcampoididae
    - Family Haliactiidae
    - Family Haloclavidae
    - Family Ilyanthidae
    - Family Limnactiniidae
    - Family Octineonidae
  - Infraorder Boloceroidaria
    - Family Boloceroididae
    - Family Nevadneidae
  - Infraorder Thenaria
    - Family Acontiophoridae
    - Family Actiniidae
    - Family Actinodendronidae
    - Family Actinoscyphiidae
    - Family Actinostolidae
    - Family Aiptasiidae
    - Family Aiptasiomorphidae
    - Family Aliciidae
    - Family Aurelianidae
    - Family Bathyphelliidae
    - Family Condylanthidae
    - Family Diadumenidae
    - Family Discosomidae
    - Family Exocoelactiidae
    - Family Haliplanellidae
    - Family Hormathiidae
    - Family Iosactiidae
    - Family Isanthidae
    - Family Isophelliidae
    - Family Liponematidae
    - Family Metridiidae
    - Family Minyadidae
    - Family Nemanthidae
    - Family Paractidae
    - Family Phymanthidae
    - Family Sagartiidae
    - Family Sagartiomorphidae
    - Family Stichodactylidae
    - Family Thalassianthidae
- Suborder Protantheae
  - Family Gonactiniidae
- Suborder Ptychodacteae
  - Family Preactiidae
  - Family Ptychodactiidae
