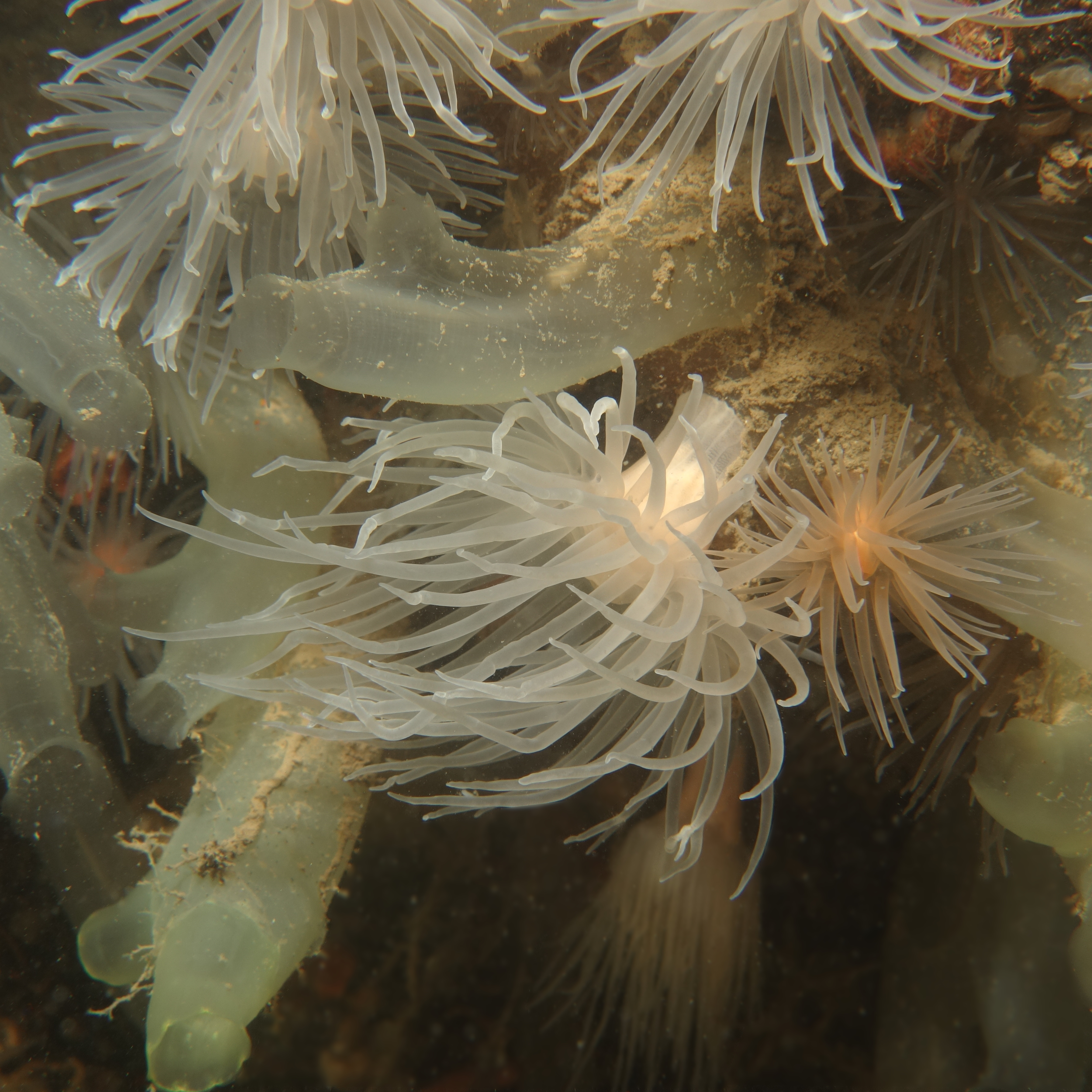
- Protanthea simplex, Sound of Mull, Scotland

Scientific classification
- Kingdom: Animalia
- Phylum: Cnidaria
- Subphylum: Anthozoa
- Class: Hexacorallia
- Order: Actiniaria
- Suborder: Enthemonae; Rodríguez & Daly, 2014

Superfamilies
- See text

= Enthemonae =

Suborder of sea anemone

The Enthemonae is a suborder of sea anemones in the order Actiniaria. It comprises those sea anemones with typical arrangement of mesenteries for actiniarians.

The Enthemonae is any member of the invertebrate suborder characterised by soft bodied, marine animals that look like flowers which primarily attach to hard or rigid surfaces, such as coral or rocks. An Enthemonae is a suborder of sea anemone of the order Actiniaria, which includes the overall majority of the actiniarians, which belong to the former groups of Protantheae, Ptychodacteae, and Nynantheae.

== Classification ==
It is seen that within the suborder of Enthemonae there are 46 families showing the large amount of diversity within the species. This diversity stems from the depth, heat and environment of the water they are growing in.

The differential feature between the 2 suborders of sea anemone; Enthemonae and Anenthemonae is that they are primarily characterised by having basilar muscles, mesoglea marginal sphincter and they lack acontia and arotinoids. However, Enthemonae are seen to rarely lack these types of basilar muscles and sphincters causing the outer column to be smooth in texture.

=== Superfamilies ===
Within the Enthemonae suborder, there are 3 different superfamilies; Actinostoloidea, Actinoidea and Metridioidea, all superfamilies having other families within.

Actinostoloidea and Metridioidea is known for the rare phenomenon of brooding which is only seen in 57 species out of approximately 1100 within Actiniaria. These superfamilies which are predominately found in the Southern Ocean and therefore brood externally as well as having a combination of morphological features including 12 mesenteries and an oral disc similar to glandular sacs. Whereas, the Actinoidea is a shallow water Enthemonae.

Superfamilies and families in the suborder Enthemonae include:

- Superfamily Actinostoloidea
  - Family Actinostolidae
  - Family Halcampulactidae
- Superfamily Actinioidea
  - Family Actiniidae
  - Family Actinodendridae
  - Family Andresiidae
  - Family Capneidae
  - Family Condylanthidae
  - Family Haloclavidae
  - Family Homostichanthidae
  - Family Iosactinidae
  - Family Limnactiniidae
  - Family Liponematidae
  - Family Minyadidae
  - Family Oractinidae
  - Family Phymanthidae
  - Family Preactiniidae
  - Family Ptychodactinidae
  - Family Stichodactylidae
  - Family Thalassianthidae
- Superfamily Metridioidea
  - Family Acontiophoridae
  - Family Acricoactinidae
  - Family Actinoscyphiidae
  - Family Aiptasiidae
  - Family Aiptasiomorphidae
  - Family Aliciidae
  - Family Amphianthidae
  - Family Andvakiidae
  - Family Antipodactinidae
  - Family Bathyphelliidae
  - Family Boloceroididae
  - Family Diadumenidae
  - Family Exocoelactinidae
  - Family Gonactiniidae
  - Family Halcampidae
  - Family Haliactinidae
  - Family Hormathiidae
  - Family Isanthidae
  - Family Kadosactinidae
  - Family Metridiidae
  - Family Nemanthidae
  - Family Nevadneidae
  - Family Octineonidae
  - Family Ostiactinidae
  - Family Phelliidae
  - Family Sagartiidae
  - Family Sagartiomorphidae
  - Family Spongiactinidae

== Structure ==
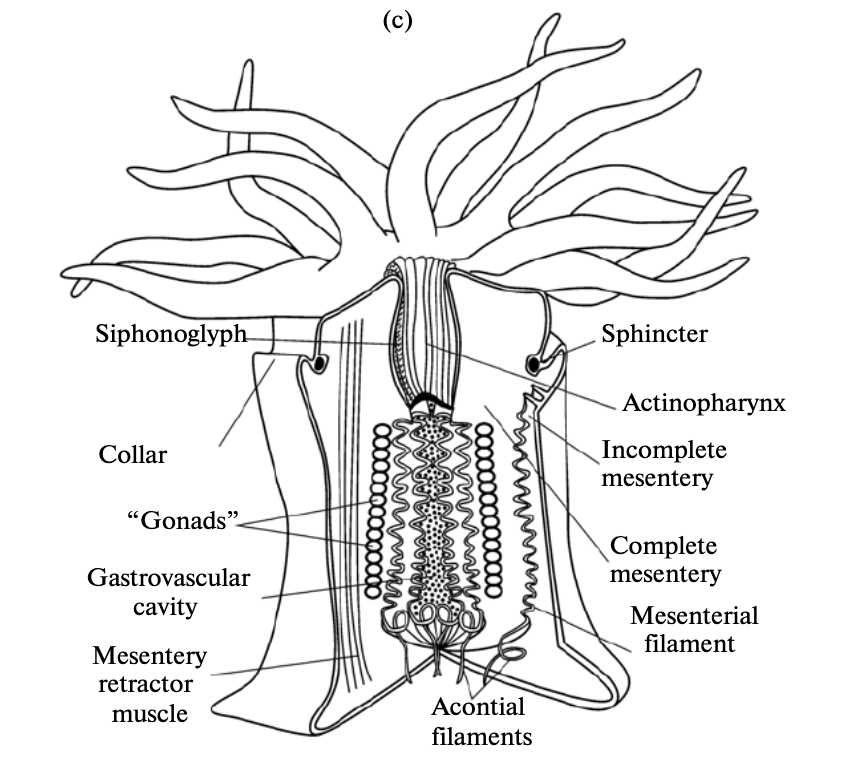
The internal structure of a sea anemone

Sea Anemones are solitary hexacoral polyps which in contrast to the majority of colonial forms have no skeleton. They are diploblastic animals, with a body that displays a wall consisting of 2 layers; the epidermis and the gastrodermis, separated by an extracellular mesoglea which contains many amebocytes.

=== Body ===
The body is of a cylinder shape or a truncated cone shaped that contains the oral disk with a fringe of tentacles arranged in one to several configurations around the mouth opening. The basal body end in the majority of species extends into the pedal disk which serves with the purpose of an attachment to the substrate.

=== Mouth ===
The slit in the mouth leads to a flattened tube known as the actinopharynx which is seen to extend into the gastrovascular cavity. These two slit like structures run along the end of the mouth to ensure that the water circulates through the gastrovascular cavity for the end goal of re-pumping it out.

=== Gastrovascular Cavity ===
The gastrovascular cavity is lined by gastrodermis cells and divided by radical septa known as mesenteries, into both lateral chambers and the central part. There are incomplete and complete mesenteries that are located in pairs; the complete mesenteries have their internal edge in the upper part that attaches to the actinopharynx. Where in comparison, the incomplete ones fail to reach the actinopharynx therefore seeing them attach to the pedal or oral disc.

== Musculature ==
Musculature is the arrangement of muscles in a body or organism.

The simple body plan of actiniarians shows the high level of morphological convergence, where many of their morphological characteristics have been lost. This form of evolution which results in unrelated organisms independently producing similarities of form, usually because they become adapted to living in similar types of environment.

Within Enthemonae, their marginal musculature has shown to be phylogenetically consistent revealing that on occasion these features have been lost several times over centuries. The enthemonae's feature of marginal musculature was lost in the Family Edwardsioidea and Family Actinoidea which stemmed from a reduction in total body size or a shift in habitat.

Basilar muscles are characteristic of all enthemonae's and are lost a number of times within each sublineage. Despite this it is implied that the endodermal and mesogleal marginal muscles represent independent and alternative derivations of marginal musculature in order to optimise the marginal sphincter muscles on our trees. These arose as the mesogleal muscles, being transformed into an endodermal muscle in their lineage. This process has arisen around 3 times within the Hexacorillia, and in each case resulted in the development of these mesogleal muscles.

== Venom ==
Enthemonae produce venom dependent on the superfamily with vast molecular diversity which are classified according to pharmacological activity and amino acid sequence. However, the exact receptors they target are either unknown or incomplete.

=== Venom system ===
All cnidarians lack a centralised venom system and in replace produce numerous venom tissues throughout the body, using 2 different cell types; nematocytes and ectodermal gland cells.

Nematocysts are the main venom delivery tissue which are capsules containing an inverted tubule capsule of extremely powerful discharge. They are present in all cnidarians and produce highly complex venom filled organelles. The most functional and common venom tissue within Enthemonae include tentacles which are used to capture prey, immobilise threats and used in digestion.

The other cell type is ectodermal gland cells which is responsible for producing a distinct collections of toxins. These toxins can be released in greater quantities due to the larger capacity of the gland in comparison to the nematocytes, which allows for the opportunity for the reach of the venom to extend.

In general, the venom of an Enthemonae are harmless to humans and in most cases only cause skin rashes and edema in the area of contact with the tentacles.

=== Venom Tissue ===
The venom that is found within these tissues are a complex combination of proteins, polypeptides and other non-protein based compounds. These components are grouped into 4 functional categories, in the ‘Cytolytic peptide and protein toxins from sea anemones’.

==== Phospholipase A_{2} ====
Degrades the membrane of the neurological and muscle cells which causes never damage and muscle inflammation.

==== Cytolysins ====
Causes cell lysis on the cell membrane.

==== Neurotoxins ====
Interact with the receptors causing an altered neural transmission through interacting with voltage-gated and ligated ion channels.

==== Non-protein compounds ====
Induce pain when there is an interaction with the venom. These can include purines and biogenic amines.

=== Enzymes ===
Due to Enthemonae not having a centralised gland system, it makes it difficult to distinguish between enzymes that play a generalised role and that of an envenomation role.

The PLA 2 catalyses the hydrolysis of the phospholipids into free fatty acids and lysophospholipids. This have been convergently recruited into the venom.

== Feeding and diet ==
Although they are flexible in the ways that they obtain their nutrition's, they are fundamentally predatory animals that use their venomous tentacles to catch prey. The dietary composition differentiates between the marine habitats that they are occupying. The mouth of the anemone can stretch as well in order to help capture their pray and ingest larger animals such as crabs, molluscs and even some species of small fish.

Some Enthemonae also are considered to be opportunistic and omnivorous feeders that feed a large extent of their diet through organic detritus, which is caught with the acid of their mucus secretion.

== Habitat ==
It is part of a highly diverse order that successfully occupies marine habitats across all depths of the ocean, ranging from the tidal zone to more than 33,000 feet. There are 3 superfamilies and up to 48 family's within, thus making it one of the largest suborders of the sea anemones long side the Anenthemonae. The greatest range of Enthemonae are found in the warmer tropical areas of the ocean but there is still a number of superfamilies that inhabit the colder and deeper waters.

== Reproduction ==
All suborders of sea anemones can reproduce both sexually and asexually.

=== Sexual reproduction ===
The sexual reproduction is a simple and straightforward process involving the fertilisation of an egg which evolves into a planula further to a polyp then an adult, which results in full anemones being released from the mouth of the adult.

The origin and the development of the germ cells in lower invertebrates originate from differentiated epithelial cells of the epidermis. This sees the simple reproductive system of sea anemones have no true gonads resulting in the accumulation of the sexual products at the mesenteries.

The sex of the germ cells is not always easy to determine at the initial stages of the cell differentiation process. However, developing oocytes unlike male germ cells, the changes in their nuclei begin earlier, with neighbouring cells may significantly differ in size.

=== Asexual reproduction ===
In comparison, there are multiple ways they can reproduce asexually including budding, fragmentation or by longitudinal or transverse binary fission.

==== Budding ====
This occurs when fragments of the organism breaks off and develops into new individuals. Some stretch themselves along the base of the surface they are attached to and split across the middle resulting in two new enthemonae, this method is known as longitudinal fission.

Another method includes smaller pieces of tissue break off from the base forming tiny anemones, this is known as basal laceration.

==== Binary fission ====
Fission is often irregular and can be stimulated by changes in the ambient conditions, such as abrupt changes in temperature or illumination. The process involves separation of small, irregularly shaped fragments from the edge of the disk of the sessile or the slowly moving sea anemone. Here sees the fragments after separation develop new tentacles on the closures of then wounds. As a result, new offspring created through binary fission have an abnormal number of tentacles and an irregular arrangement of septa.

==== Reproduction by autonomy of tentacles ====
The sphincters at the base of their tentacles can separate due to contractions of the circular muscles. The opening in the basal part of the separated tentacle is closed by a ‘tissue plug’, which then falls off with the onset of active cell proliferation and subsequent formation of the body of a new anemone.

== Symbiotic relationships ==
=== Green Algae ===
The immense ecological success of sea anemones, such as Enthemonae is due to the symbiotic relations between the hosts and the unicellular green algae. These algae's are photosynthetic and therefore the exchanges between the two are based on a nutritional exchange of the algae's bi products of oxygen and glucose. Then in response the anemone provides the algae with a safe harbour as well as provides them with a greater exposure to sunlight used for photosynthesis.

=== Hermit Crabs ===
The Enthemonae and a young hermit crab will often develop a symbiotic relationship from a young stage. This involves the young hermit crab attaching the shell to the tentacles of the sea anemone, becoming partners for the duration of their life cycle. This process often results in the two organisms growing at roughly the same rate.

The type of symbiotic relationship they develop is known as commensalism as the hermit crab is protected from predators from the venom inside the tentacles of the Enthemonae. The anemone spreads its long thin tentacles over the crab as well as extending the venomous tentacles further out as an additional layer of protection.

In return the anemone gains a food sources from the excess tidbits that the hermit crab leaves behind, providing a steady flow of a food supply.

== Phylogeny ==
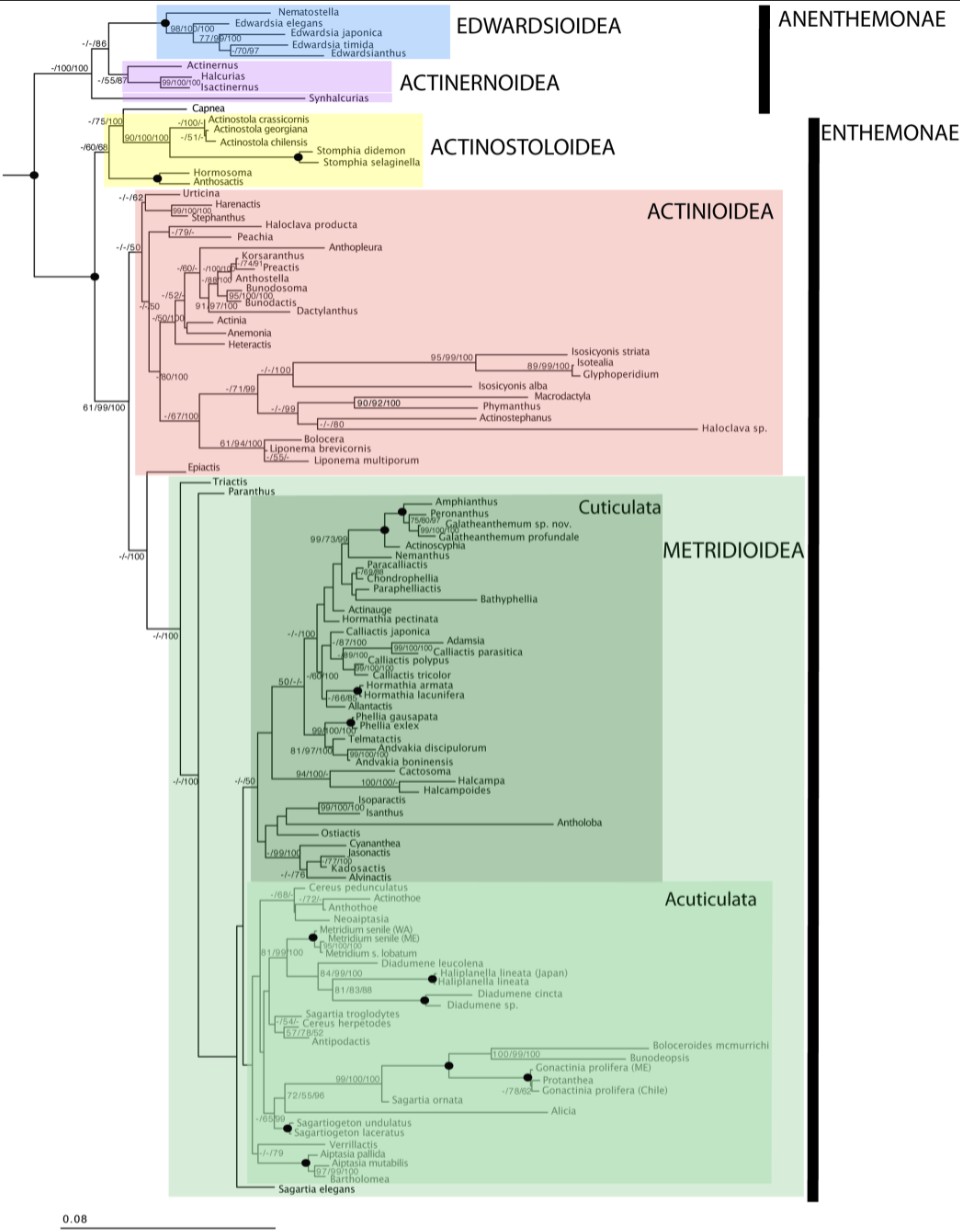

Actiniaria contains 2 subclasses known as Anenthemonae and Enthemonae, which exhibited within the following image has a number of superfamilies that are currently or still need to be explored.
