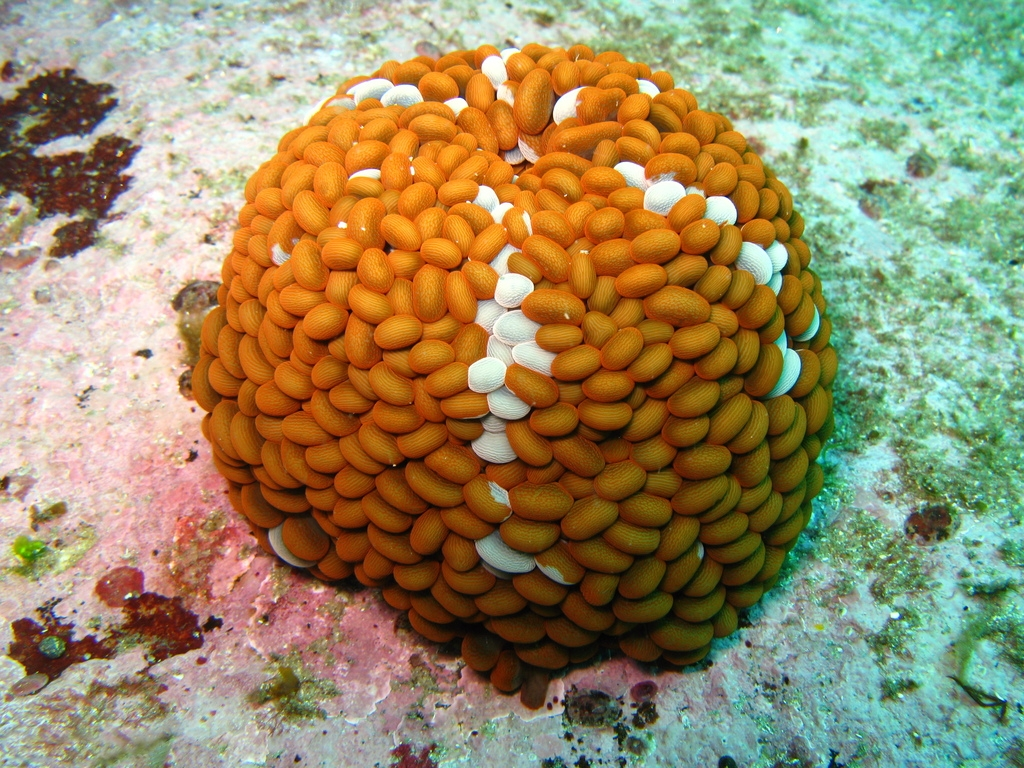
- Phlyctenactis tuberculosa

Scientific classification
- Kingdom: Animalia
- Phylum: Cnidaria
- Subphylum: Anthozoa
- Class: Hexacorallia
- Order: Actiniaria
- Suborder: Nyantheae
- Infraorder: Thenaria; Carlgren, 1899

Families
- Acontiophoridae; Actiniidae; Actinodendronidae; Actinoscyphiidae; Actinostolidae; Aiptasiidae; Aiptasiomorphidae; Aliciidae; Aurelianidae; Bathyphelliidae; Condylanthidae; Diadumenidae; Exocoelactiidae; Haliplanellidae; Hormathiidae; Iosactiidae; Isanthidae; Isophelliidae; Liponematidae; Metridiidae; Minyadidae; Nemanthidae; Paractidae; Phymanthidae; Sagartiidae; Sagartiomorphidae; Stichodactylidae; Thalassianthidae

= Thenaria =

Group of corals

Thenaria is an infraorder of cnidarian anthozoans of the suborder Nyantheae, order Actiniaria.
