= Actinioidea =

Scientific classification
- Domain: Eukaryota
- Kingdom: Animalia
- Phylum: Cnidaria
- Class: Hexacorallia
- Order: Actiniaria
- Suborder: Enthemonae
- Superfamily: Actinioidea; Rafinesque, 1815

Families
- See text

Synonyms
- Actinioidea Rodríguez & Daly in Rodríguez et al., 2014

Superfamily of sea anemones

Actinioidea is a superfamily of sea anemones in the order Actiniaria.

== Taxonomy ==
The following families are classified in the superfamily Actinioidea:

- Actiniidae
- Actinodendridae
- Andresiidae
- Condylanthidae
- Haloclavidae
- Harenactidae
- Heteranthidae
- Heteractidae
- Homostichanthidae
- Iosactinidae
- Limnactiniidae
- Liponematidae
- Oractinidae
- Peachiidae
- Phymanthidae
- Preactiniidae
- Ptychodactinidae
- Stichodactylidae
- Thalassianthidae
