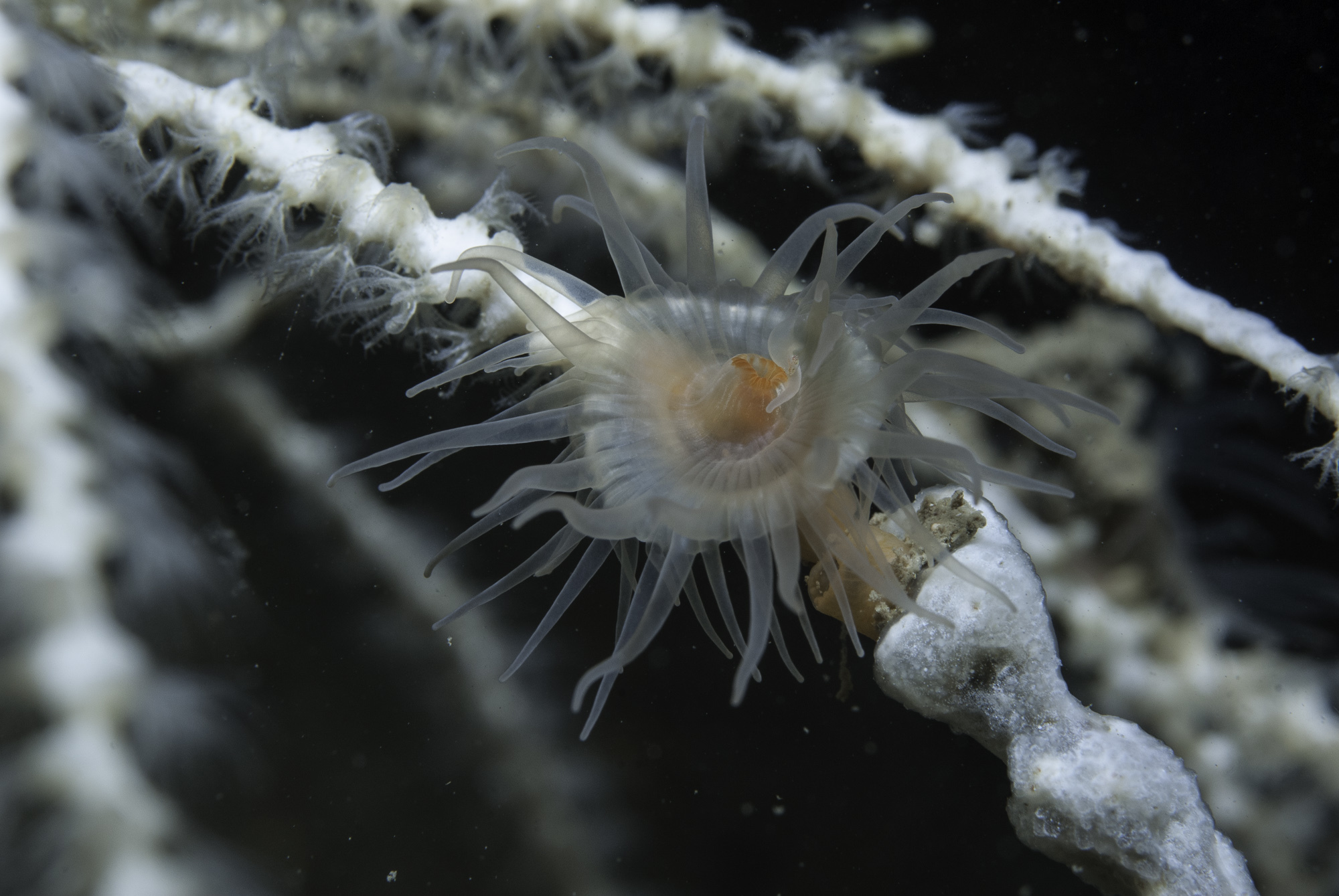

Conservation status
- Data Deficient (IUCN 3.1) (Mediterranean)

Scientific classification
- Kingdom: Animalia
- Phylum: Cnidaria
- Subphylum: Anthozoa
- Class: Hexacorallia
- Order: Actiniaria
- Family: Amphianthidae
- Genus: Amphianthus
- Species: A. dohrnii

Binomial name
- Amphianthus dohrnii (Koch, 1878)

Synonyms
- List: Amphianthus dohrni (Koch, 1878); Amphianthus dorni; Amphiantus dohrnii (Koch, 1878); Gephyra dohrni Koch, 1878; Gephyra dohrnii Koch, 1878; Gephyra dorhni; Gephyropsis dohrni (Koch, 1878); Gephyropsis dohrnii (Koch, 1878); Sagartia dohrnii (Koch, 1878)

= Amphianthus dohrnii =

Species of sea anemone

Amphianthus dohrnii, the sea fan anemone, is a species of sea anemone in the family Hormathiidae. It occurs in the northeastern Atlantic Ocean and Mediterranean Sea and grows on sea fans.

== Distribution and habitat ==
Amphianthus dohrnii is native to the northeastern Atlantic Ocean and the western end of the Mediterranean Sea. It is scarce on the west coast of Scotland but more plentiful in southwestern Britain and in the western and southern parts of Ireland. It is present on the west coast of France and the westernmost parts of the Mediterranean at depths down to about 1,000 m (3,281 ft). It tolerates both strong and weak currents and both plenty of, and little, wave action. It seems to grow exclusively on the stems of gorgonian corals, primarily the northern sea fan (Swiftia pallida) in the north of its range, and the pink sea fan (Eunicella verrucosa) in the south.

== Description ==
Amphianthus dohrnii is a small species, seldom exceeding 1 cm (0.4 in) in diameter, though the base, where it adheres to the substrate, may be up to 25 mm (1.0 in) long. It has about eighty short, tapering tentacles and is red, orange, pinkish or buff, with irregular translucent white markings.

== Biology ==
Reproduction is mostly by basal laceration, a form of asexual reproduction. The sea anemone crawls along a hard surface and pieces of tissue become detached and grow into new individuals. However, it is likely that sexual reproduction sometimes takes place, as otherwise this species would be unlikely to be so widely dispersed. Amphianthus dohrnii was at one time common in both the Mediterranean and the English Channel, but it seems now to be absent from the former and increasingly rare in the latter. In British waters, the sea fan Eunicella verrucosa has declined, possibly being damaged by dredging or in association with higher sea temperatures, and the already rare Amphianthus dohrnii has become scarcer.
