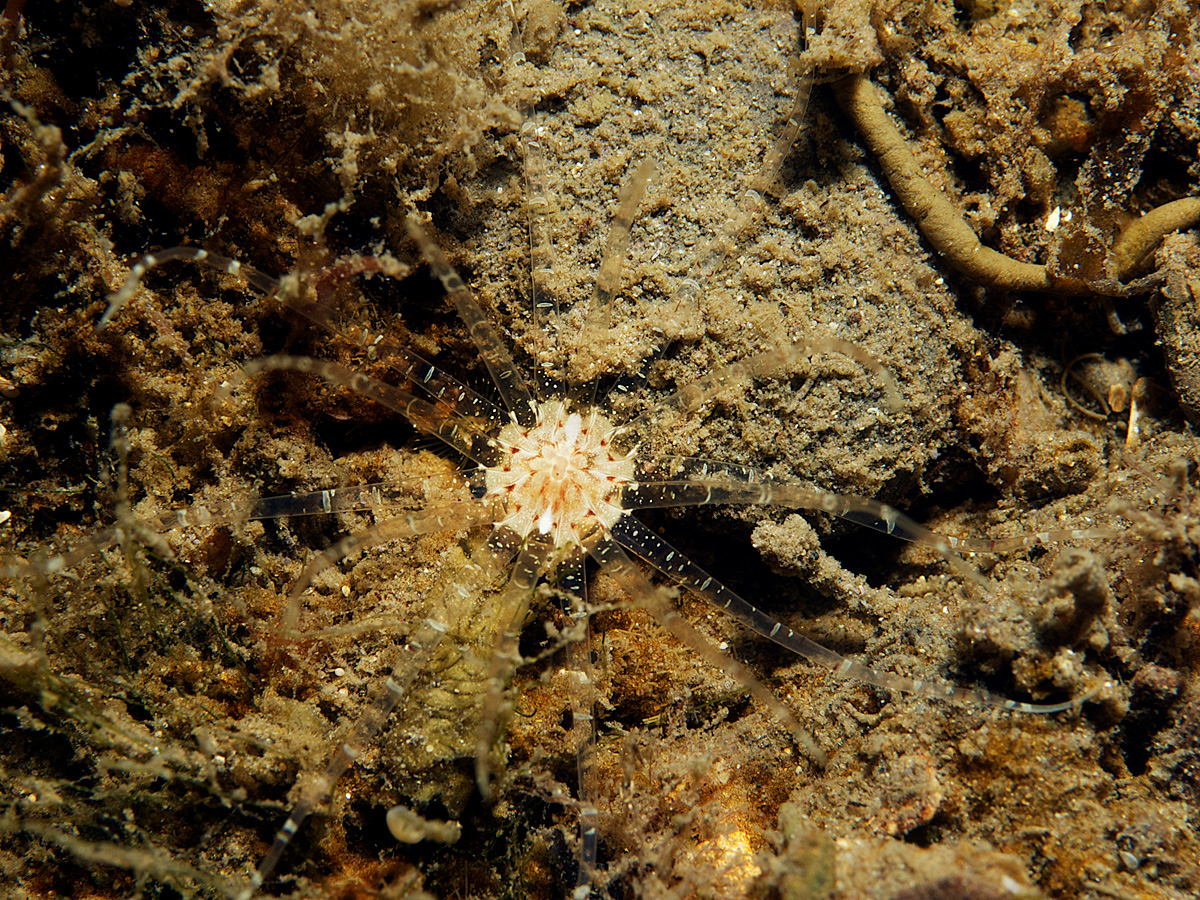
- Edwardsia claparedii

Scientific classification
- Kingdom: Animalia
- Phylum: Cnidaria
- Subphylum: Anthozoa
- Class: Hexacorallia
- Order: Actiniaria
- Suborder: Anenthemonae
- Superfamily: Actinernoidea; Stephenson, 1922

Families
- See text

Synonyms
- Endocoelantheae

= Actinernoidea =

Superfamily of sea anemones

Actinernoidea is a superfamily of sea anemones in the order Actiniaria. Until 2014, this taxon was considered to be a separate suborder of the order Actiniaria.

The following families are recognized in the superfamily Actinernoidea:

- Actinernidae Stephenson, 1922
- Halcuriidae Carlgren, 1918
