= Galatheanthemidae =

Scientific classification
- Kingdom: Animalia
- Phylum: Cnidaria
- Subphylum: Anthozoa
- Class: Hexacorallia
- Order: Actiniaria
- Family: Galatheanthemidae

Family of cnidarians

Galatheanthemidae is a family of sea anemones belonging to the order Actiniaria.

Genera:

- Galatheanthemum Carlgren, 1956
