= Aurelianidae =

Scientific classification
- Kingdom: Animalia
- Phylum: Cnidaria
- Subphylum: Anthozoa
- Class: Hexacorallia
- Order: Actiniaria
- Infraorder: Thenaria
- Family: Aurelianidae; Andres, 1883

Family of sea anemones

Aurelianidae is a family of sea anemones, comprising the following genera:

- Actinoporus Duchassaing, 1850
- Aureliana Gosse, 1860
