= Anenthemonae =

Scientific classification
- Kingdom: Animalia
- Phylum: Cnidaria
- Subphylum: Anthozoa
- Class: Hexacorallia
- Order: Actiniaria
- Suborder: Anenthemonae; Rodriguez & Daly, 2014

Superfamilies
- See text

Suborder of sea anemones

Anenthemonae is a suborder of sea anemones in the order Actiniaria. It comprises those sea anemones with atypical arrangement of mesenteries for actiniarians.

Superfamilies and families in the suborder Anenthemonae include:

- Superfamily Actinernoidea Stephenson, 1922
  - Actinernidae Stephenson, 1922
  - Halcuriidae Carlgren, 1918
- Superfamily Edwardsioidea Andres, 1881
  - Edwardsiidae Andres, 1881

== Classification ==
The differential feature between the 2 suborders of sea anemone; Enthemonae and Anenthemonae is that they are primarily characterised by having basilar muscles, mesoglea marginal sphincter and they lack acontia and carotinoids. They however, rarely lack these types of basilar muscles and sphincters causing the outer column to be smooth in texture.
