= AETX =

AETX refers to a group of polypeptide neurotoxins isolated from the sea anemone Anemonia erythraea that target ion channels, altering their function. Four subtypes have been identified: AETX I, II, III and K, which vary in their structure and target.

== Etymology and Source ==
The four subtypes of AETX (Anemonia erythraea toxins) are produced by the sea anemone Anemonia erythraea.

== Chemistry ==
=== AETX I ===
AETX I consists of 47 amino acids. The determined molecular mass appears to be approximately 5 kDa. It is classified into Type I voltage-gated sodium channel neurotoxins. As reported by Norton et al., this group consists of polypeptide neurotoxins with an average of 46-49 amino acids and 27 residues that are highly conserved. AETX I shares 21 of the 27 conserved residues with the representatives of Type I polypeptide toxins from sea anemone.

=== AETX II & III ===
AETX II and AETX III have not yet been categorized since their structure does not correspond to any known polypeptide neurotoxins from sea anemone. AETX II is composed of 59 amino acid residues and has a molecular mass of 6506 Da. AETX III has the same number of amino acid residues and a molecular mass of 6558 Da. AETX II and III are highly homologous with a similarity percentage of 94.9%.

Both AETX II and III show sequence similarities to the neurotoxin TxI isolated from Phoneutria nigriventer, an aggressive Brazilian spider. These similarities concern the position of 7 half-cystine (oxidized cysteine) residues in both AETX II and III, consistent with the conserved half-cystine residues throughout the P. nigriventer neurotoxins. The amino acid sequence of AETX I differs from the amino acid sequences of AETX II and III. AETX I is rich in the amino acids asparagine and aspartic acid and has no lysine while AETX II and III both have a high number of half-cystines. All three polypeptides have in common that glycine is the most abundant amino acid.

=== AETX K ===
AETX K is a member of the Type I potassium channel toxin family. However, in contrast to the other members of this family which have 35-37 amino acid residues, AETX K consists of 83 amino acid residues; it has a molecular mass of 3999.3 Da. It shares six conserved Cys residues with the other members of Type I potassium channel toxins.

== Target and Mode of action ==
AETX I is part of the sea anemone sodium channel inhibitory subfamily 1 and binds to the neurotoxin receptor site 3 of voltage-gated sodium channels, slowing down their inactivation. The mode of action of AETX II and III is not known, but they show structural similarity to spider toxins and therefore may act the same way, i.e. they might activate voltage dependent sodium channels. AETX K belongs to the group of type 1 sea anemone potassium channel toxins. Its lysine-tyrosine pair (^{21}Lys and ^{22}Tyr) seems to be crucial for its binding to potassium channels.

== Toxicity ==
The LD_{50} against crabs was estimated for AETX I (2.2 μg/kg), II (0.53 μg/kg) and III (0.28 μg/kg). None of these toxins shows a strong toxic effect in mice. The LD50 of AETX K is not known so far, but its 50% inhibitory concentration (IC50) was determined as 91 nM.
