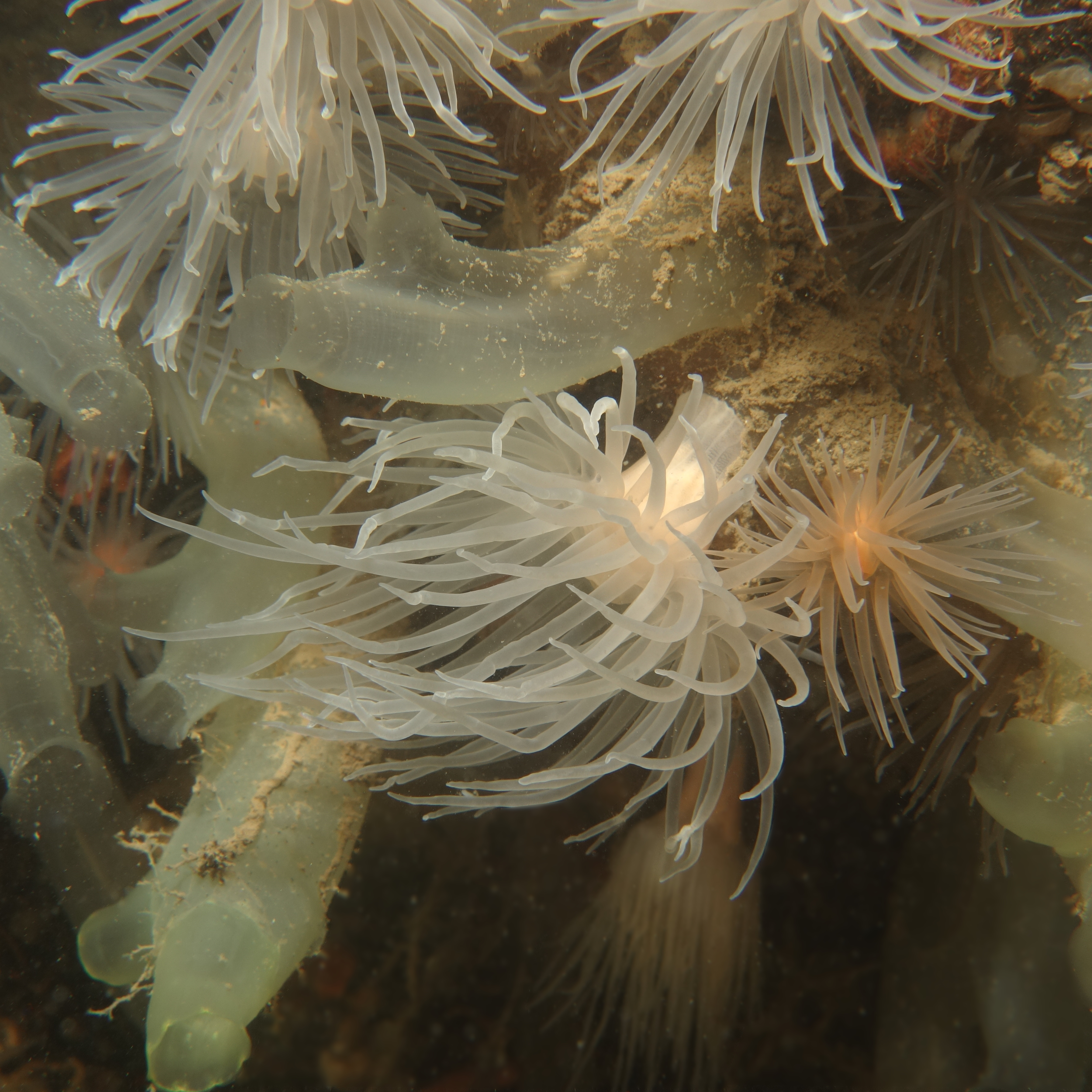
- Protanthea simplex, Sound of Mull, Scotland

Scientific classification
- Kingdom: Animalia
- Phylum: Cnidaria
- Subphylum: Anthozoa
- Class: Hexacorallia
- Order: Actiniaria
- Suborder: Enthemonae
- Superfamily: Metridioidea; Carlgren, 1893

Families
- See text

= Metridioidea =

Superfamily of sea anemones

Metridioidea is a superfamily of sea anemones in the order Actiniaria. Members of this clade live in shallow subtropical waters worldwide.

== List of families ==
Families in the superfamily Metridioidea include:

- Family Acontiophoridae
- Family Acricoactinidae
- Family Actinoscyphiidae
- Family Aiptasiidae
- Family Aiptasiomorphidae
- Family Aliciidae
- Family Amphianthidae
- Family Andvakiidae
- Family Antipodactinidae
- Family Bathyphelliidae
- Family Boloceroididae
- Family Diadumenidae
- Family Gonactiniidae
- Family Halcampidae
- Family Haliactinidae
- Family Hormathiidae
- Family Isanthidae
- Family Kadosactinidae
- Family Metridiidae
- Family Nemanthidae
- Family Nevadneidae
- Family Octineonidae
- Family Ostiactinidae
- Family Phelliidae
- Family Sagartiidae
- Family Sagartiomorphidae
- Family Spongiactinidae
