= Spongiactinidae =

Scientific classification
- Kingdom: Animalia
- Phylum: Cnidaria
- Subphylum: Anthozoa
- Class: Hexacorallia
- Order: Actiniaria
- Superfamily: Metridioidea
- Family: Spongiactinidae; Sanamyan N., Sanamyan K. & Tabachnick, 2012

Family of sea anemones

Spongiactinidae is a family of sea anemones.

== Genera ==
The following genera are recognized:

- Spongiactis Sanamyan N., Sanamyan K. & Tabachnick, 2012
