= Ostiactinidae =

Scientific classification
- Kingdom: Animalia
- Phylum: Cnidaria
- Subphylum: Anthozoa
- Class: Hexacorallia
- Order: Actiniaria
- Superfamily: Metridioidea
- Family: Ostiactinidae; Rodríguez, Barbeitos, Daly, Gusmão & Häussermann, 2012

Family of sea anemones

Ostiactinidae is a family of sea anemones.

== Genera ==
The following genera are recognized:

- Ostiactis Rodríguez, Barbeitos, Daly, Gusmão & Häussermann, 2012
