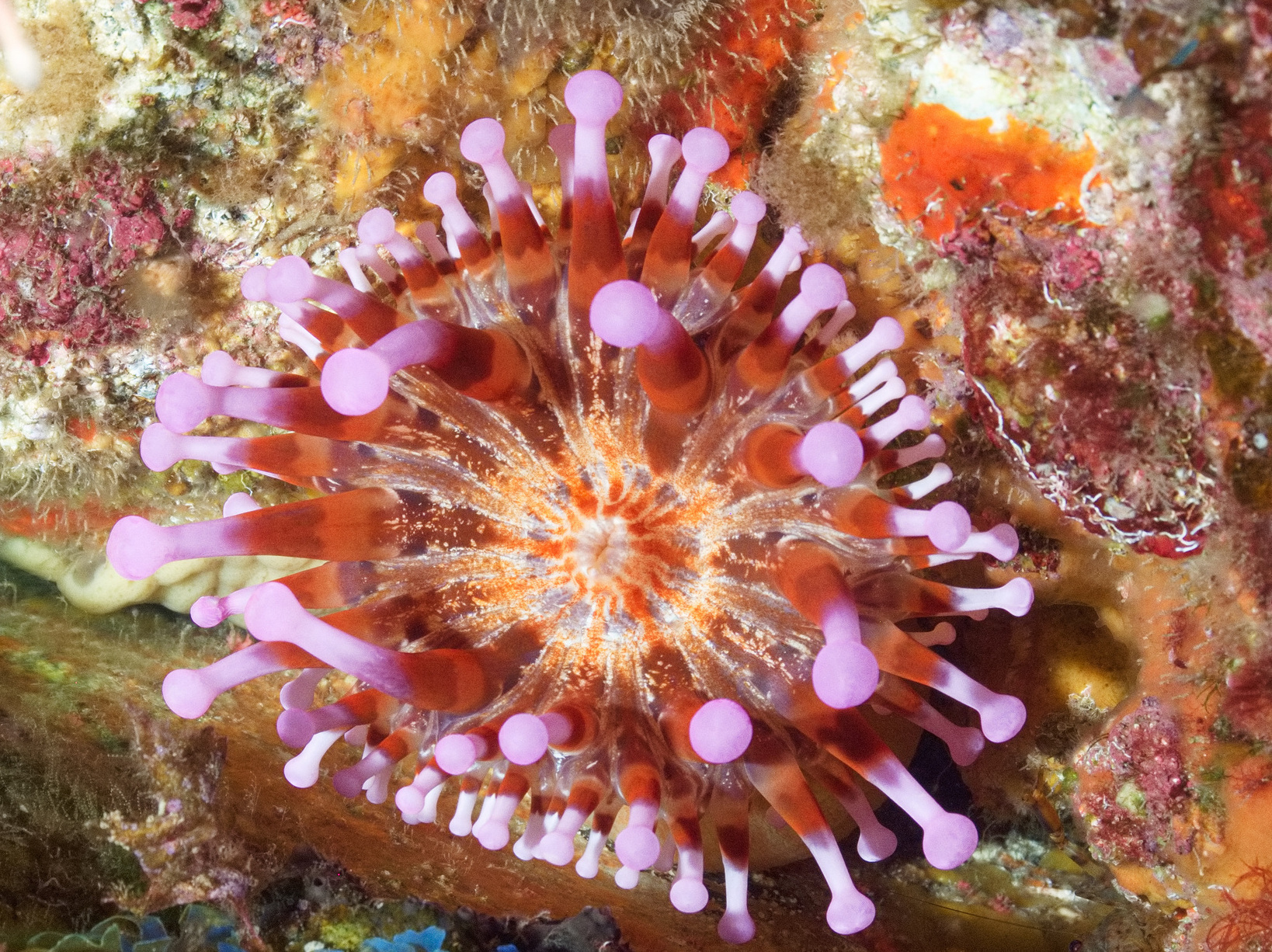
- Telmatactis cricoides

Scientific classification
- Kingdom: Animalia
- Phylum: Cnidaria
- Subphylum: Anthozoa
- Class: Hexacorallia
- Order: Actiniaria
- Superfamily: Metridioidea
- Family: Andvakiidae; Danielssen, 1890

Synonyms
- Andwakiidae; Isophellidae

= Andvakiidae =

Family of sea anemones

Andvakiidae is a family of sea anemones.

== Genera ==
The following genera are recognized:

- Andvakia Danielssen, 1890
- Epiphellia Carlgren, 1949
- Euphellia Pax, 1908
- Flosmaris Stephenson, 1920
- Gymnophellia England, 1992
- Ilyactis Andres, 1883
- Litophellia Carlgren, 1938
- Synandwakia Carlgren, 1947
- Telmatactis Gravier, 1916
