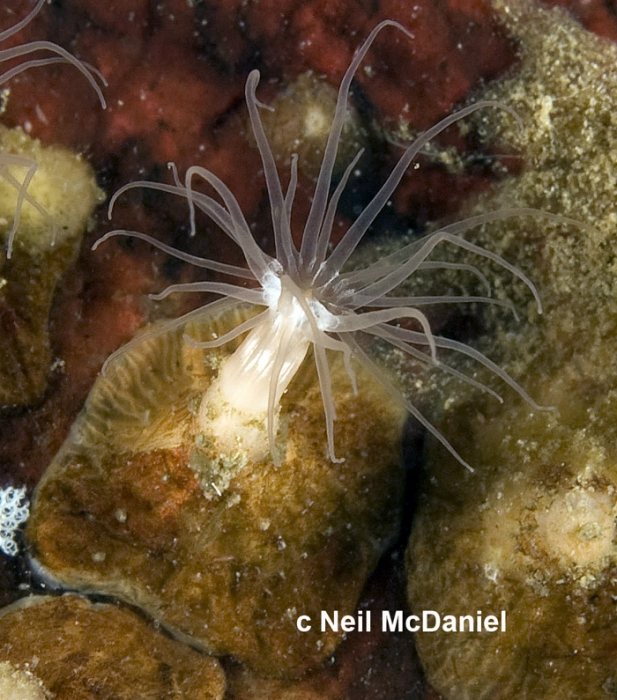
- Octineon suecicum

Scientific classification
- Domain: Eukaryota
- Kingdom: Animalia
- Phylum: Cnidaria
- Subphylum: Anthozoa
- Class: Hexacorallia
- Order: Actiniaria
- Superfamily: Metridioidea
- Family: Octineonidae; Fowler, 1894
- Genus: Octineon; Moseley in Fowler, 1894

= Octineon =

Genus of sea anemones

Octineon is the sole genus of sea anemones in the monotypic family Octineonidae.

== Distribution ==
There are few records of this organism, but it has been reported living within the North Pacific waters, and is thought to have a much wider distribution than that. It is difficult to identify due to the fact that it's usually flat against bedrock on the sea floor.

== Species ==
The genus contains the following species:

- Octineon chilense Carlgren, 1959
- Octineon lindahli (Carpenter in Carpenter & Jeffreys, 1871)
- Octineon suecicum Carlgren, 1940
