= Nevadneidae =

Scientific classification
- Kingdom: Animalia
- Phylum: Cnidaria
- Subphylum: Anthozoa
- Class: Hexacorallia
- Order: Actiniaria
- Superfamily: Metridioidea
- Family: Nevadneidae; Carlgren, 1925

Family of sea anemones

Nevadneidae is a family of sea anemones.

== Genera ==
The following genera are recognized:

- Nevadne Stephenson, 1922
