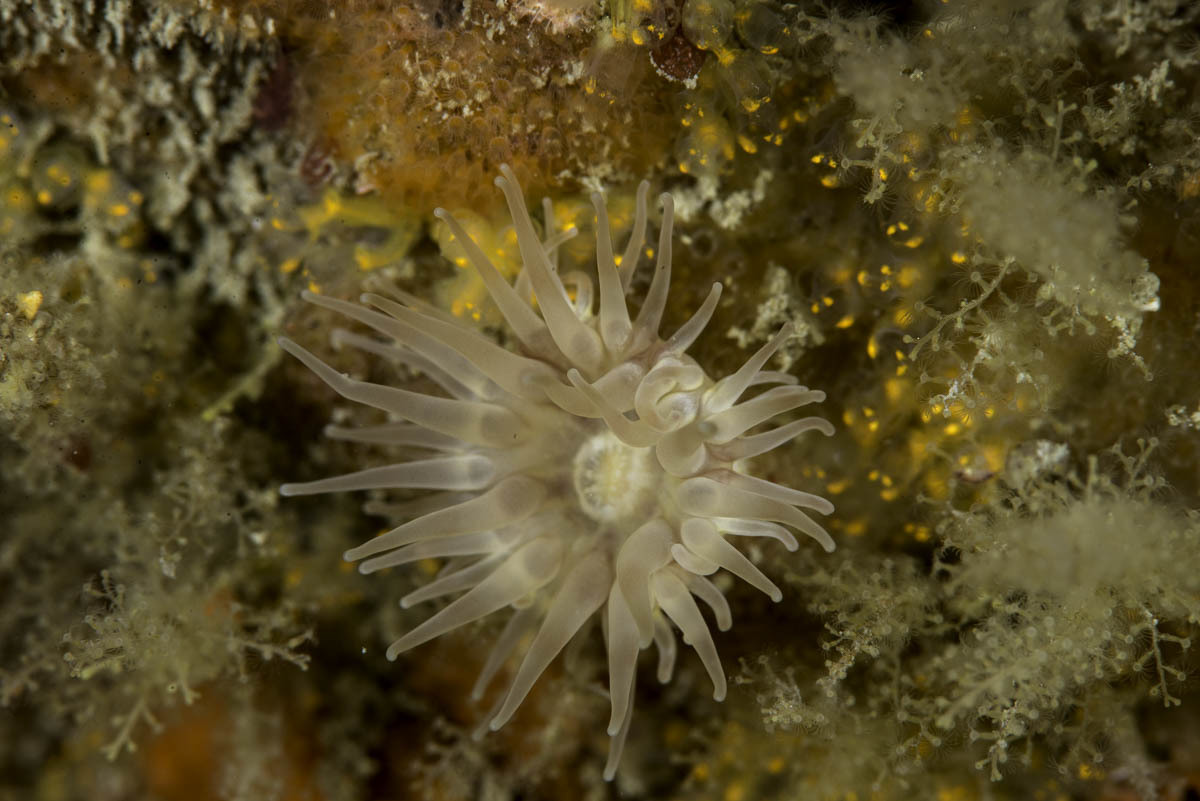
- Phellia gausapata

Scientific classification
- Kingdom: Animalia
- Phylum: Cnidaria
- Subphylum: Anthozoa
- Class: Hexacorallia
- Order: Actiniaria
- Superfamily: Metridioidea
- Family: Phelliidae; Verrill, 1868

= Phelliidae =

Family of sea anemones

Phelliidae is a family of sea anemones.

== Genera ==
The following genera are recognized:

- Phellia Gosse, 1858
