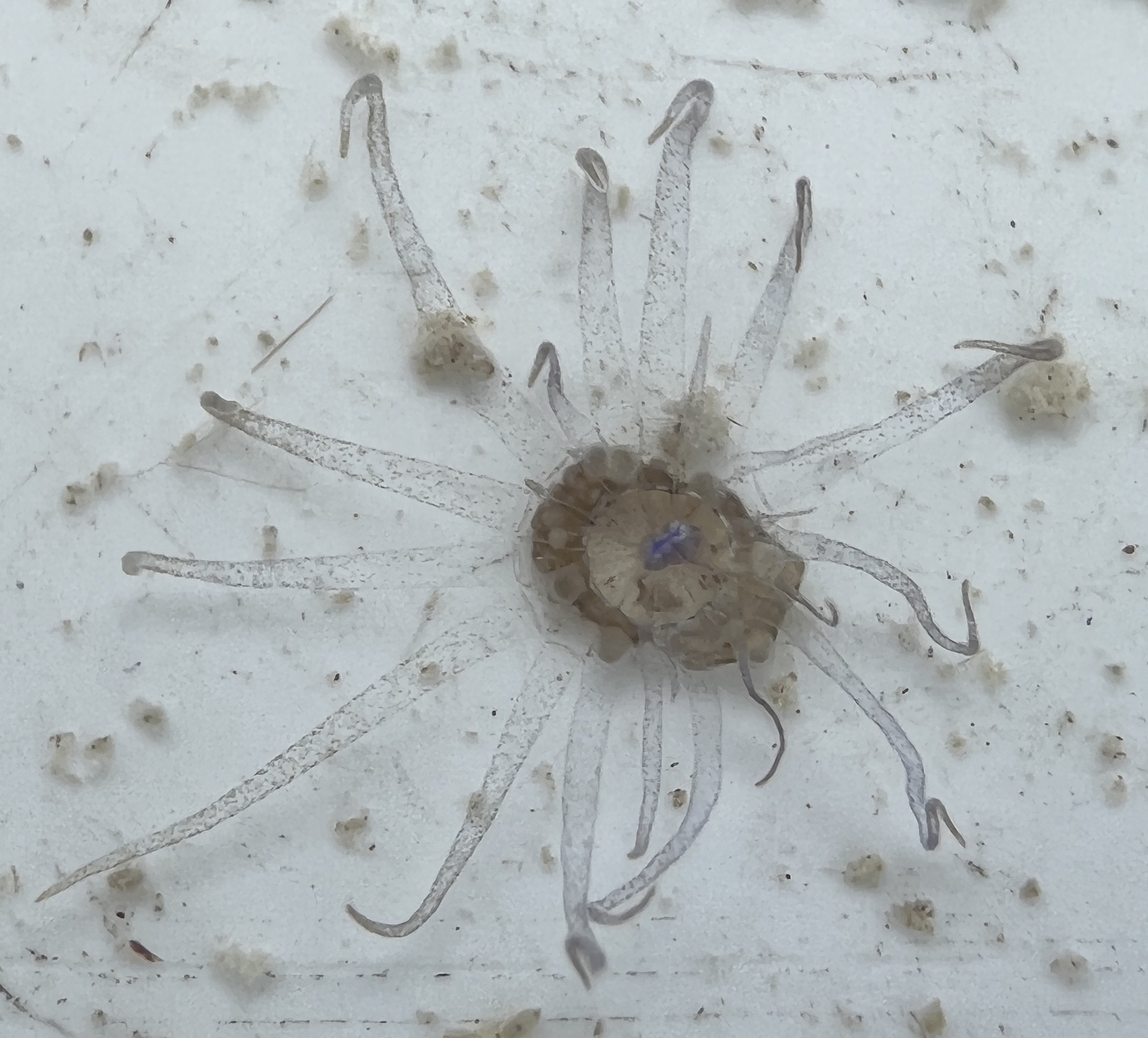
- Bunodeopsis globulifera

Scientific classification
- Kingdom: Animalia
- Phylum: Cnidaria
- Subphylum: Anthozoa
- Class: Hexacorallia
- Order: Actiniaria
- Superfamily: Metridioidea
- Family: Boloceroididae; Carlgren, 1924

= Boloceroididae =

Family of sea anemones

Boloceroididae is a family of sea anemones. It has a cosmopolitan distribution in tropical and temperate oceans.

== Genera ==
The following genera are recognized:

- Boloceractis Panikkar, 1937
- Boloceroides Carlgren, 1899
- Bunodeopsis Andres, 1881
