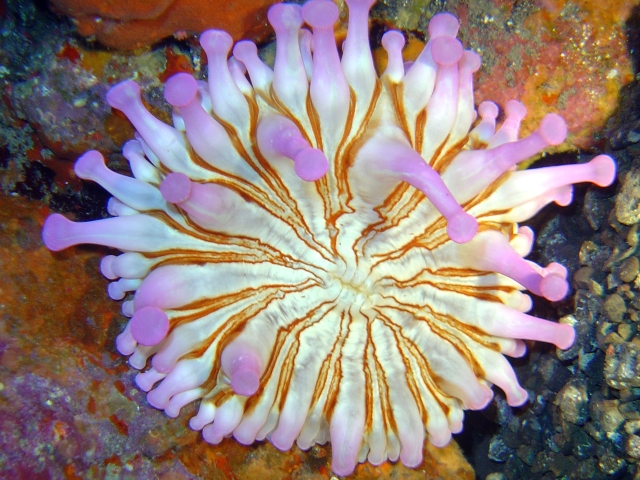
- Telmatactis cricoides

Scientific classification
- Kingdom: Animalia
- Phylum: Cnidaria
- Subphylum: Anthozoa
- Class: Hexacorallia
- Order: Actiniaria
- Family: Isophelliidae

= Isophelliidae =

Family of sea anemones

Isophelliidae is a family of sea anemones belonging to the order Actiniaria.

Genera:

- Isophellia Carlgren, 1900
