= Haliactinidae =

Scientific classification
- Kingdom: Animalia
- Phylum: Cnidaria
- Subphylum: Anthozoa
- Class: Hexacorallia
- Order: Actiniaria
- Superfamily: Metridioidea
- Family: Haliactinidae; Carlgren, 1949

Synonyms
- Haliactiidae

Family of sea anemones

Haliactinidae is a family of sea anemones.

== Genera ==
The following genera are recognized:

- Halcampactis Farquhar, 1898
- Haliactis Carlgren, 1921
- Pelocoetes Annandale, 1915
- Phytocoeteopsis Panikkar, 1936
- Phytocoetes Annandale, 1915
- Stephensonactis Panikkar, 1936
