= Halcampulactidae =

Scientific classification
- Kingdom: Animalia
- Phylum: Cnidaria
- Subphylum: Anthozoa
- Class: Hexacorallia
- Order: Actiniaria
- Family: Halcampulactidae

Family of sea anemones

Halcampulactidae is a family of sea anemones belonging to the order Actiniaria.

Genera:

- Halcampulactis Gusmão, Berniker, Van Deusen, Harris & Rodríguez, 2019
