= Antipodactinidae =

Scientific classification
- Kingdom: Animalia
- Phylum: Cnidaria
- Subphylum: Anthozoa
- Class: Hexacorallia
- Order: Actiniaria
- Superfamily: Metridioidea
- Family: Antipodactinidae; Rodríguez, López-González & Daly, 2009

Family of sea anemones

Antipodactinidae is a family of sea anemones.

== Genera ==
The following genera are recognized:

- Antipodactis Rodríguez, López-González & Daly, 2009
