= Kadosactinidae =

Scientific classification
- Kingdom: Animalia
- Phylum: Cnidaria
- Subphylum: Anthozoa
- Class: Hexacorallia
- Order: Actiniaria
- Superfamily: Metridioidea
- Family: Kadosactinidae; Riemann-Zürneck, 1991

Family of sea anemones

Kadosactinidae is a family of sea anemones.

== Genera ==
The following genera are recognized:

- Alvinactis Rodríguez, Castorani & Daly, 2008
- Cyananthea Doumenc & Van-Praët, 1988
- Jasonactis Rodríguez, Barbeitos, Daly, Gusmão & Häussermann, 2012
- Kadosactis Danielssen, 1890
- Maractis Fautin & Barber, 1999
- Marianactis Fautin & Hessler, 1989
- Pacmanactis López-González, Rodríguez & Segonzac, 2005
- Paranthosactis López-González, Rodríguez, Gili & Segonzac, 2003
- Seepactis Sanamyan & Sanamyan, 2007
