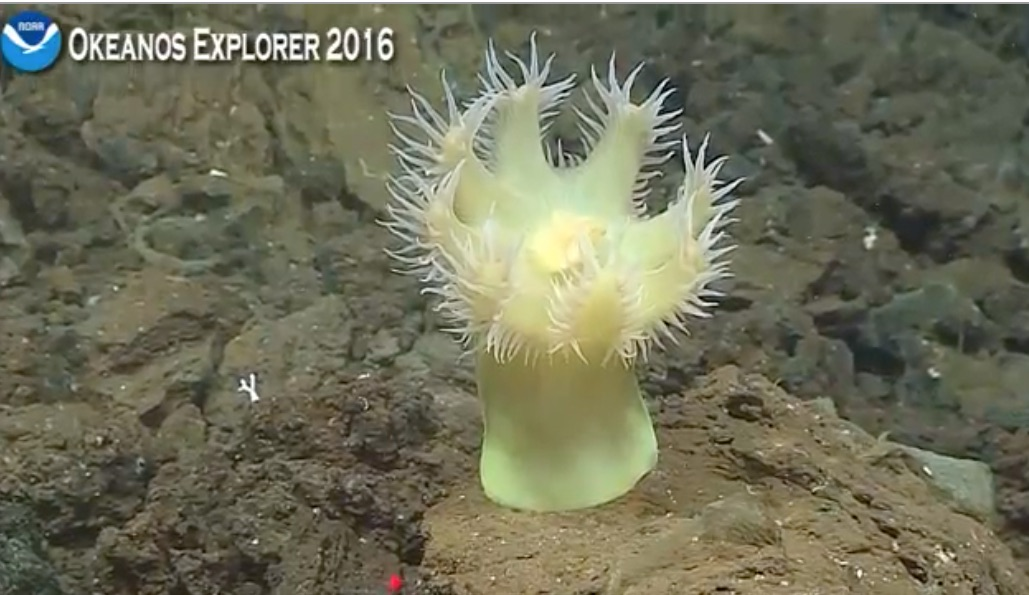
- Isactinernus

Scientific classification
- Kingdom: Animalia
- Phylum: Cnidaria
- Subphylum: Anthozoa
- Class: Hexacorallia
- Order: Actiniaria
- Family: Actinernidae; Stephenson, 1922

= Actinernidae =

Family of sea anemones

Actinernidae is a family of sea anemones. It contains the following genera and species: (Note: A binomial authority in parentheses indicates that the species was originally described in a genus other than the present genus.)

Actinernus Verrill, 1879

- Actinernus elongatus (Hertwig, 1882)
- Actinernus michaelsarsi Carlgren, 1918
- Actinernus nobilis Verrill, 1879
- Actinernus robustus (Hertwig, 1882)

Isactinernus Carlgren, 1918

- Isactinernus quadrilobatus Carlgren, 1918

Synactinernus Carlgren, 1918

- Synactinernus flavus Carlgren, 1918

Synhalcurias Carlgren, 1914

- Synhalcurias elegans (Wassilieff, 1908)
