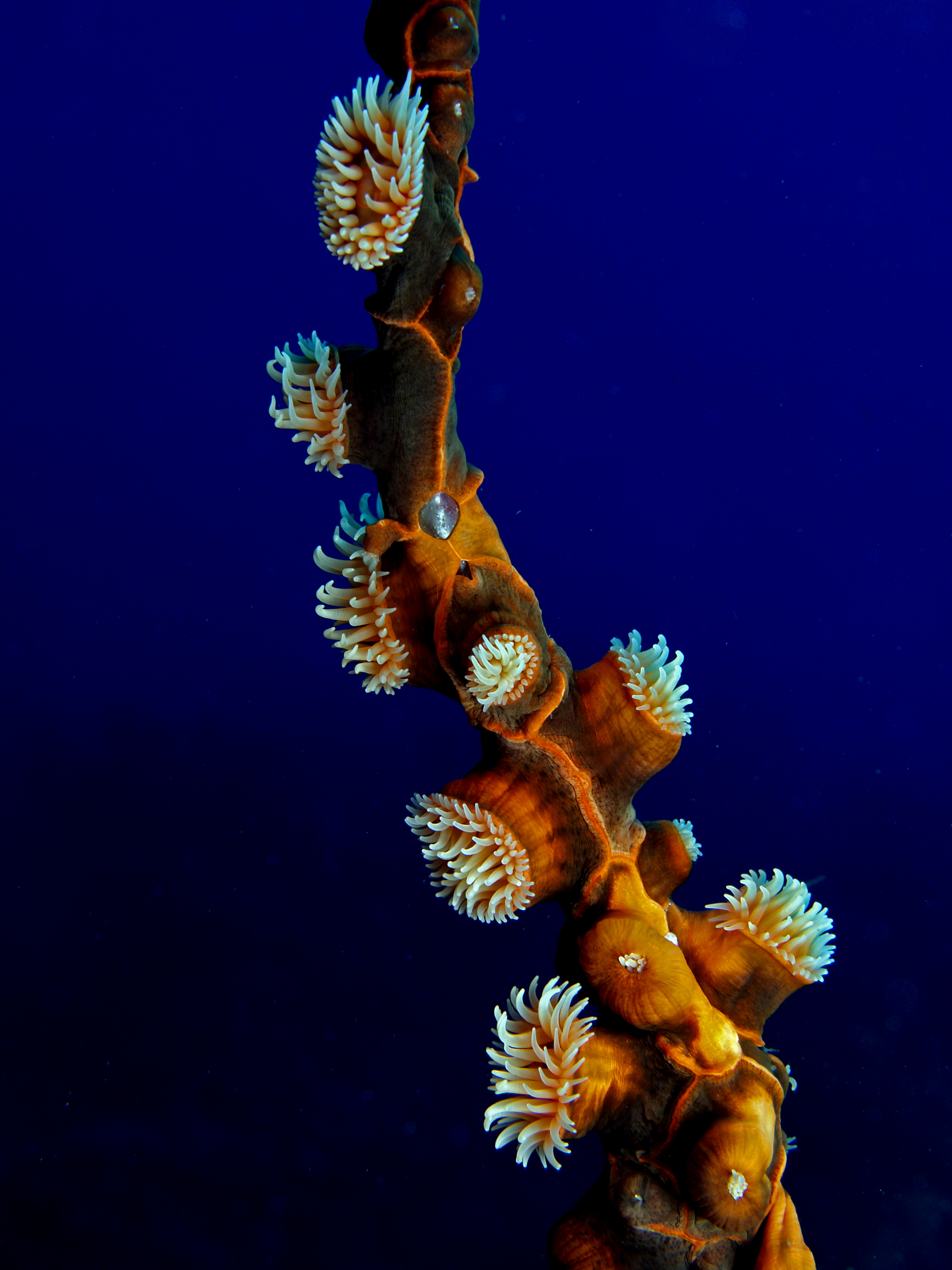
- Amphianthus sp.

Scientific classification
- Domain: Eukaryota
- Kingdom: Animalia
- Phylum: Cnidaria
- Class: Hexacorallia
- Order: Actiniaria
- Family: Amphianthidae; Hertwig, 1882
- Genus: Amphianthus; Hertwig, 1882

= Amphianthus =

Genus of sea anemones

Amphianthus is a genus of sea anemones. It is the only genus in the monotypic family Amphianthidae.

== Species ==
The following species are recognized:

- Amphianthus armatus Carlgren, 1928
- Amphianthus bathybium Hertwig, 1882
- Amphianthus brunneus (Pax, 1909)
- Amphianthus californicus Carlgren, 1936
- Amphianthus capensis Carlgren, 1928
- Amphianthus caribaeus (Verrill, 1899)
- Amphianthus dohrnii (Koch, 1878)
- Amphianthus ingolfi Carlgren, 1942
- Amphianthus islandicus Carlgren, 1942
- Amphianthus lacteus (Mc Murrich, 1893)
- Amphianthus laevis Carlgren, 1938
- Amphianthus margaritaceus (Danielssen, 1890)
- Amphianthus michaelsarsi Carlgren, 1934
- Amphianthus minutus (Hertwig, 1882)
- Amphianthus mirabilis (Verrill, 1879)
- Amphianthus mopseae (Danielssen, 1890)
- Amphianthus natalensis Carlgren, 1938
- Amphianthus nitidus (Verrill, 1899)
- Amphianthus norvegicus Carlgren, 1942
- Amphianthus radiatus Carlgren, 1928
- Amphianthus rosaceus Wassilieff, 1908
- Amphianthus sanctaehelenae Carlgren, 1941
- Amphianthus valdiviae Carlgren, 1928
- Amphianthus verruculatus Carlgren, 1942
