= Exocoelactiidae =

Scientific classification
- Kingdom: Animalia
- Phylum: Cnidaria
- Subphylum: Anthozoa
- Class: Hexacorallia
- Order: Actiniaria
- Family: Exocoelactiidae

Synonyms
- Exocoelactinidae

Family of sea anemones

Exocoelactiidae is a family of sea anemones belonging to the order Actiniaria.

Genera:

- Exocoelactis Carlgren, 1925
