= Minyadidae =

Scientific classification
- Kingdom: Animalia
- Phylum: Cnidaria
- Subphylum: Anthozoa
- Class: Hexacorallia
- Order: Actiniaria
- Family: Minyadidae

Family of sea anemones

Minyadidae is a family of sea anemones belonging to the order Actiniaria.

Genera:

- Actinecta de Blainville, 1830
- Echinactis Milne-Edwards & Haime, 1851
- Nautactis Milne-Edwards & Haime, 1857
- Oceanactis Moseley, 1877
- Phlyctaenominyas Andres, 1883
- Phyllominyas Andres, 1883
