= Aiptasiomorphidae =

Scientific classification
- Kingdom: Animalia
- Phylum: Cnidaria
- Subphylum: Anthozoa
- Class: Hexacorallia
- Order: Actiniaria
- Superfamily: Metridioidea
- Family: Aiptasiomorphidae; Carlgren, 1949

Family of sea anemones

Aiptasiomorphidae is a family of sea anemones.

== Genera ==
The following genera are recognized:

- Aiptasiomorpha Stephenson, 1920
