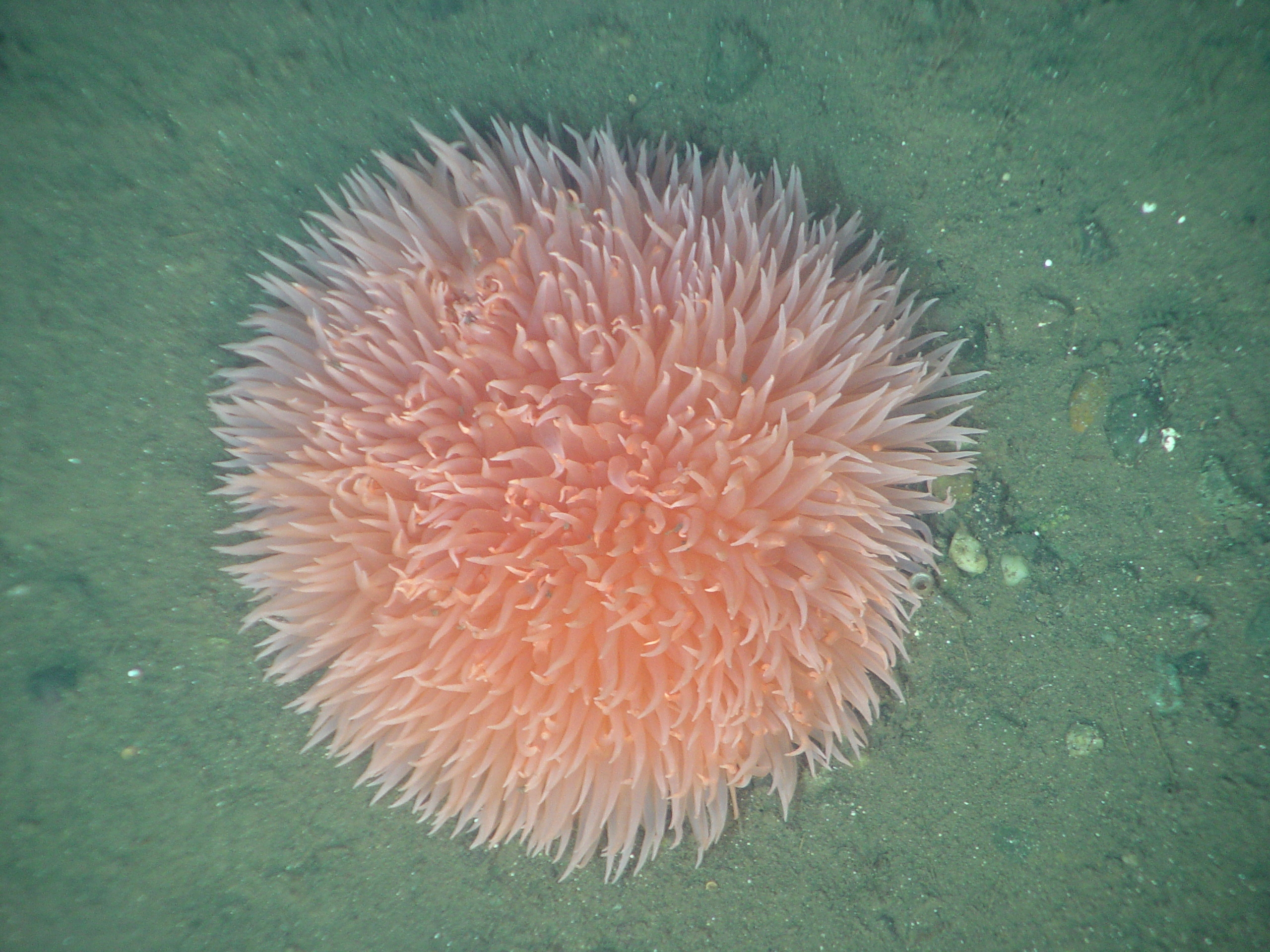
- Liponema brevicornis.

Scientific classification
- Kingdom: Animalia
- Phylum: Cnidaria
- Subphylum: Anthozoa
- Class: Hexacorallia
- Order: Actiniaria
- Superfamily: Actinioidea
- Family: Liponematidae; Hertwig, 1882

Genera
- Aulorchis Hertwig, 1888; Liponema Hertwig, 1888

= Liponematidae =

Family of sea anemones

Liponematidae is a family of sea anemones.
