= Halcuriidae =

Scientific classification
- Kingdom: Animalia
- Phylum: Cnidaria
- Subphylum: Anthozoa
- Class: Hexacorallia
- Order: Actiniaria
- Family: Halcuriidae

Family of sea anemones

Halcuriidae is a family of sea anemones belonging to the order Actiniaria.

Genera:

- Carlgrenia Stephenson, 1918
- Halcurias McMurrich, 1893
