= Oractiidae =

Scientific classification
- Kingdom: Animalia
- Phylum: Cnidaria
- Subphylum: Anthozoa
- Class: Hexacorallia
- Order: Actiniaria
- Family: Oractiidae; Riemann-Zürneck, 2000

Synonyms
- Oractinidae

Family of sea anemones

Oractiidae is a family of sea anemones belonging to the order Actiniaria.

Genera:

- Oceanactis Moseley, 1877 (synonym Oractis McMurrich, 1893)
