= Sagartiomorphidae =

Scientific classification
- Kingdom: Animalia
- Phylum: Cnidaria
- Subphylum: Anthozoa
- Class: Hexacorallia
- Order: Actiniaria
- Superfamily: Metridioidea
- Family: Sagartiomorphidae; Carlgren, 1934

Family of sea anemones

Sagartiomorphidae is a family of marine sea anemones. This taxonomic family lives in Australia.

== Genera ==
The following genera are recognized:

- Sagartiomorphe Carlgren, 1934
