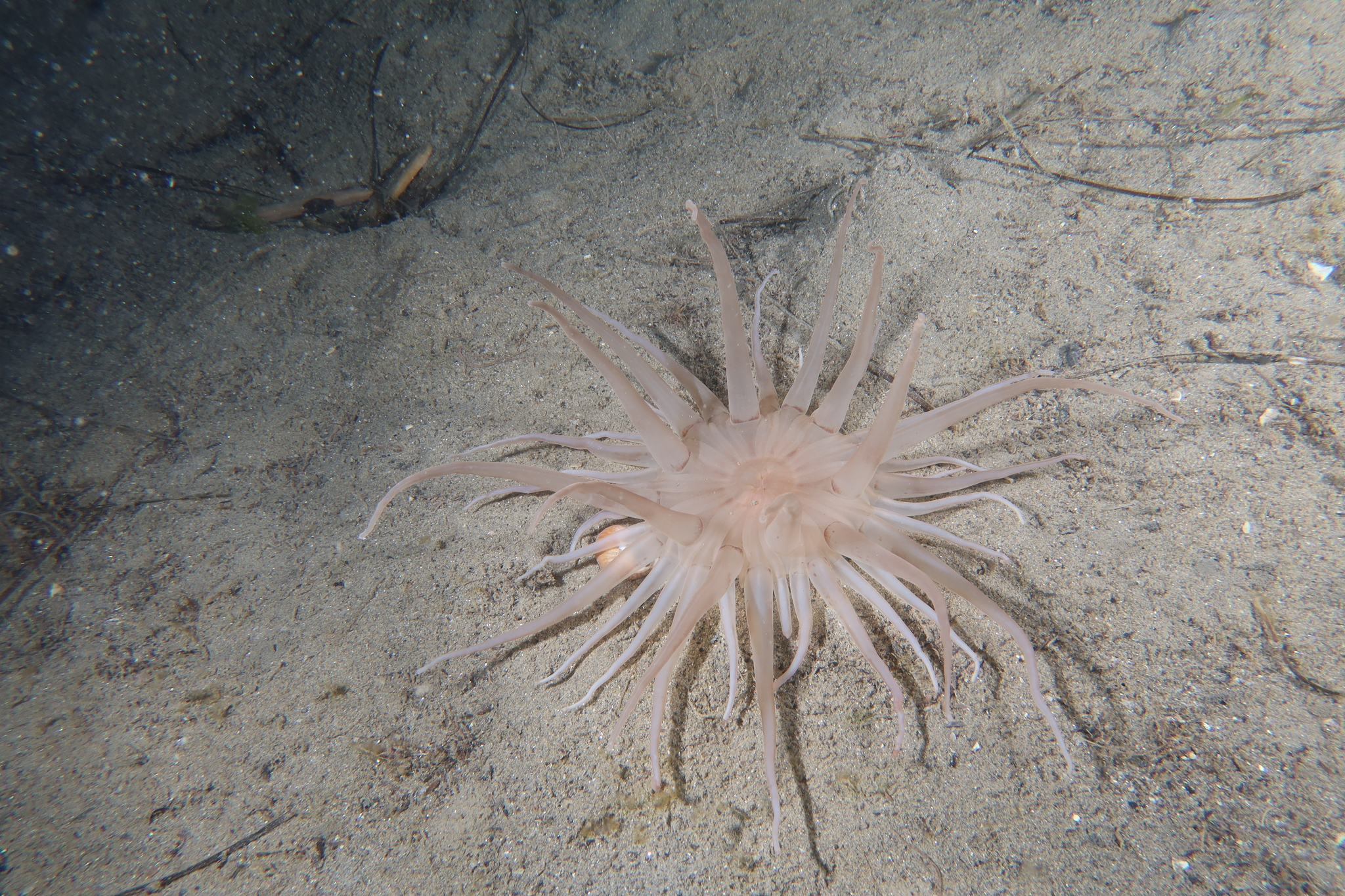
- Andresia partenopea

Scientific classification
- Kingdom: Animalia
- Phylum: Cnidaria
- Subphylum: Anthozoa
- Class: Hexacorallia
- Order: Actiniaria
- Family: Andresiidae

= Andresiidae =

Family of sea anemones

Andresiidae is a family of sea anemones belonging to the order Actiniaria.

Genera:

- Andresia Stephenson, 1921
