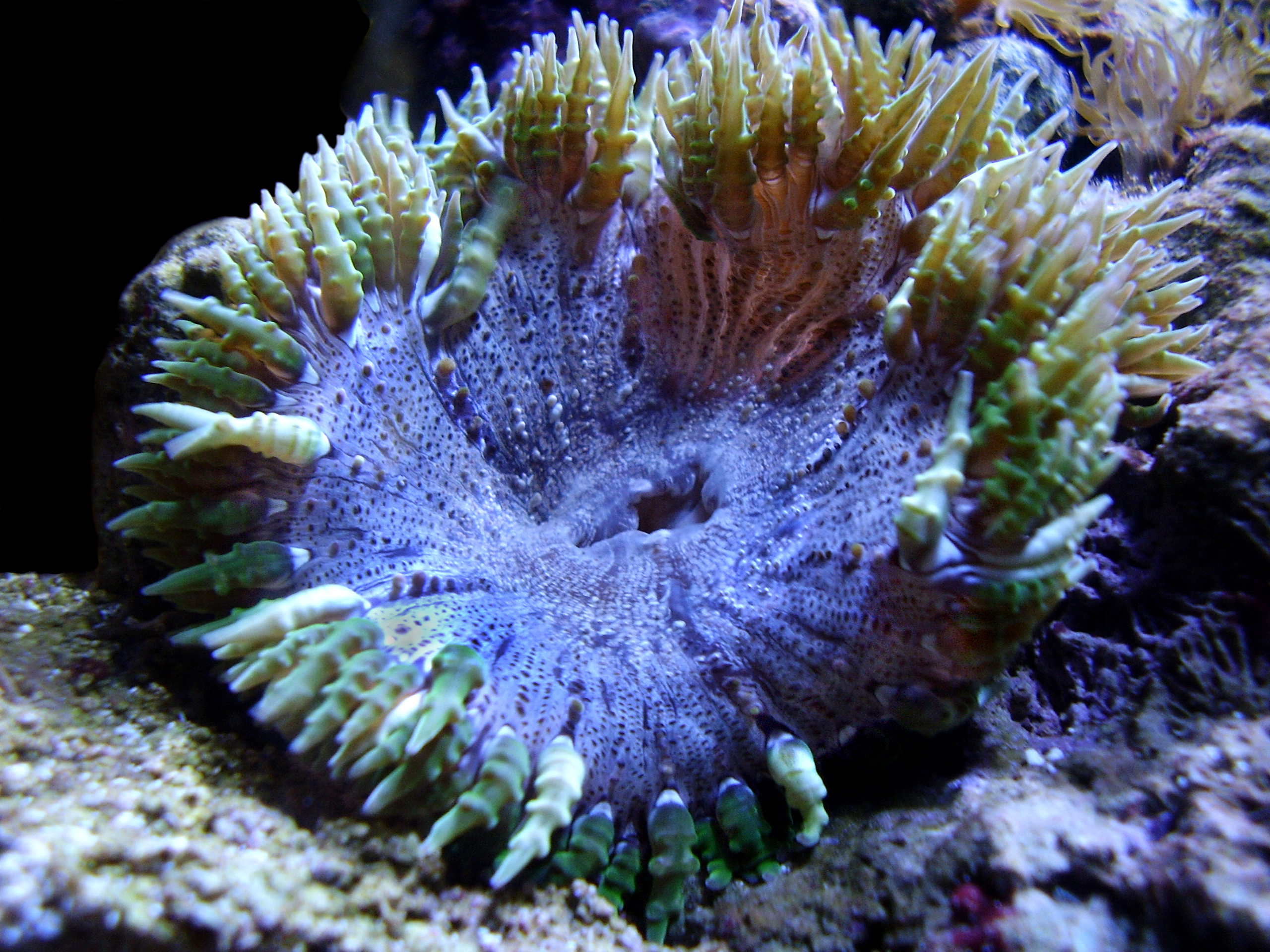
- Phymanthus crucifer

Scientific classification
- Kingdom: Animalia
- Phylum: Cnidaria
- Subphylum: Anthozoa
- Class: Hexacorallia
- Order: Actiniaria
- Superfamily: Actinioidea
- Family: Phymanthidae

= Phymanthidae =

Family of sea anemones

Phymanthidae is a family of sea anemones belonging to the order Actiniaria.

Genera:

- Epicystes Ehrenberg, 1834
- Heteranthus Klunzinger, 1877
- Phymanthus Milne Edwards & Haime, 1851
