= Bathyphelliidae =

Scientific classification
- Kingdom: Animalia
- Phylum: Cnidaria
- Subphylum: Anthozoa
- Class: Hexacorallia
- Order: Actiniaria
- Superfamily: Metridioidea
- Family: Bathyphelliidae; Carlgren, 1932

Family of sea anemones

Bathyphelliidae is a family of sea anemones.

== Genera ==
The following genera are recognized:

- Acontiactis
- Acraspedanthus Carlgren, 1924
- Bathyphellia Carlgren, 1932
- Daontesia Carlgren, 1942
- Phelliogeton Carlgren, 1927
