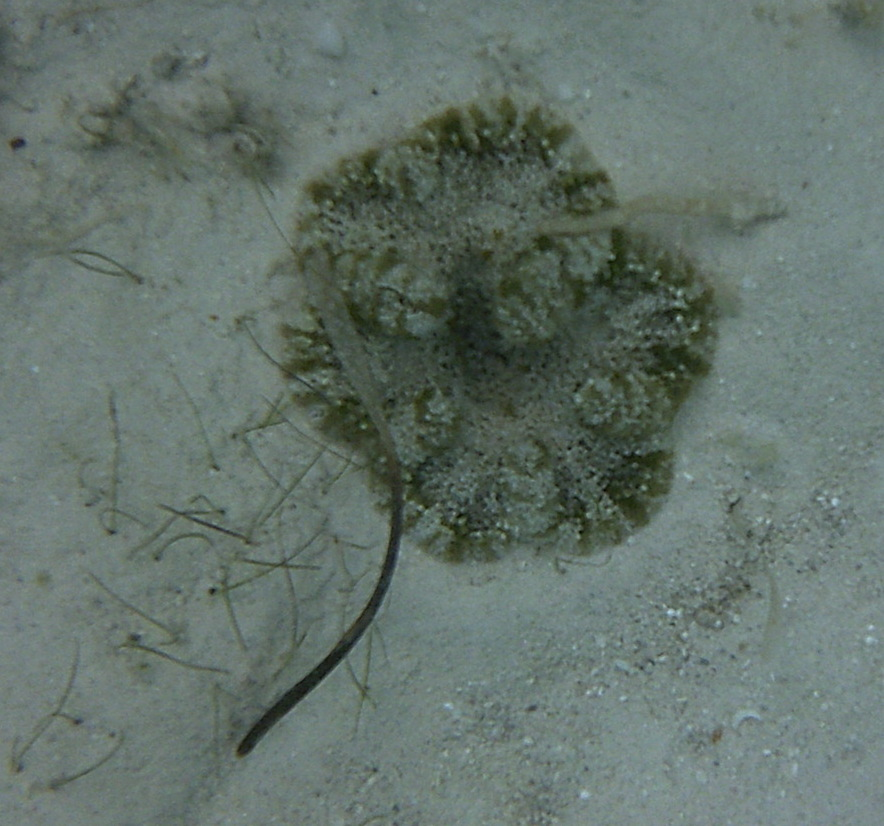
- Homostichanthus duerdeni

Scientific classification
- Kingdom: Animalia
- Phylum: Cnidaria
- Subphylum: Anthozoa
- Class: Hexacorallia
- Order: Actiniaria
- Family: Homostichanthidae

= Homostichanthidae =

Family of sea anemones

Homostichanthidae is a family of sea anemones belonging to the order Actiniaria.

Genera:

- Homostichanthus
