= Iosactinidae =

Scientific classification
- Kingdom: Animalia
- Phylum: Cnidaria
- Subphylum: Anthozoa
- Class: Hexacorallia
- Order: Actiniaria
- Family: Iosactinidae

Synonyms
- Iosactiidae

Family of sea anemones

Iosactinidae is a family of sea anemones belonging to the order Actiniaria.

Genera:

- Iosactis Riemann-Zürneck, 1997
