= Condylanthidae =

Scientific classification
- Kingdom: Animalia
- Phylum: Cnidaria
- Subphylum: Anthozoa
- Class: Hexacorallia
- Order: Actiniaria
- Family: Condylanthidae

Family of sea anemones

Condylanthidae is a family of sea anemones belonging to the order Actiniaria.

Genera:

- Cadetactis Fautin, 2016
- Charisactis Ocaña & Çinar, 2018
- Charisea Torrey, 1902
- Charisella Carlgren, 1949
- Condylanthus Carlgren, 1899
- Macrocnema Carlgren, 1928
- Pseudhormathia Carlgren, 1943
- Riactis Fautin, 2016
- Segonzactis Riemann-Zürneck, 1979
