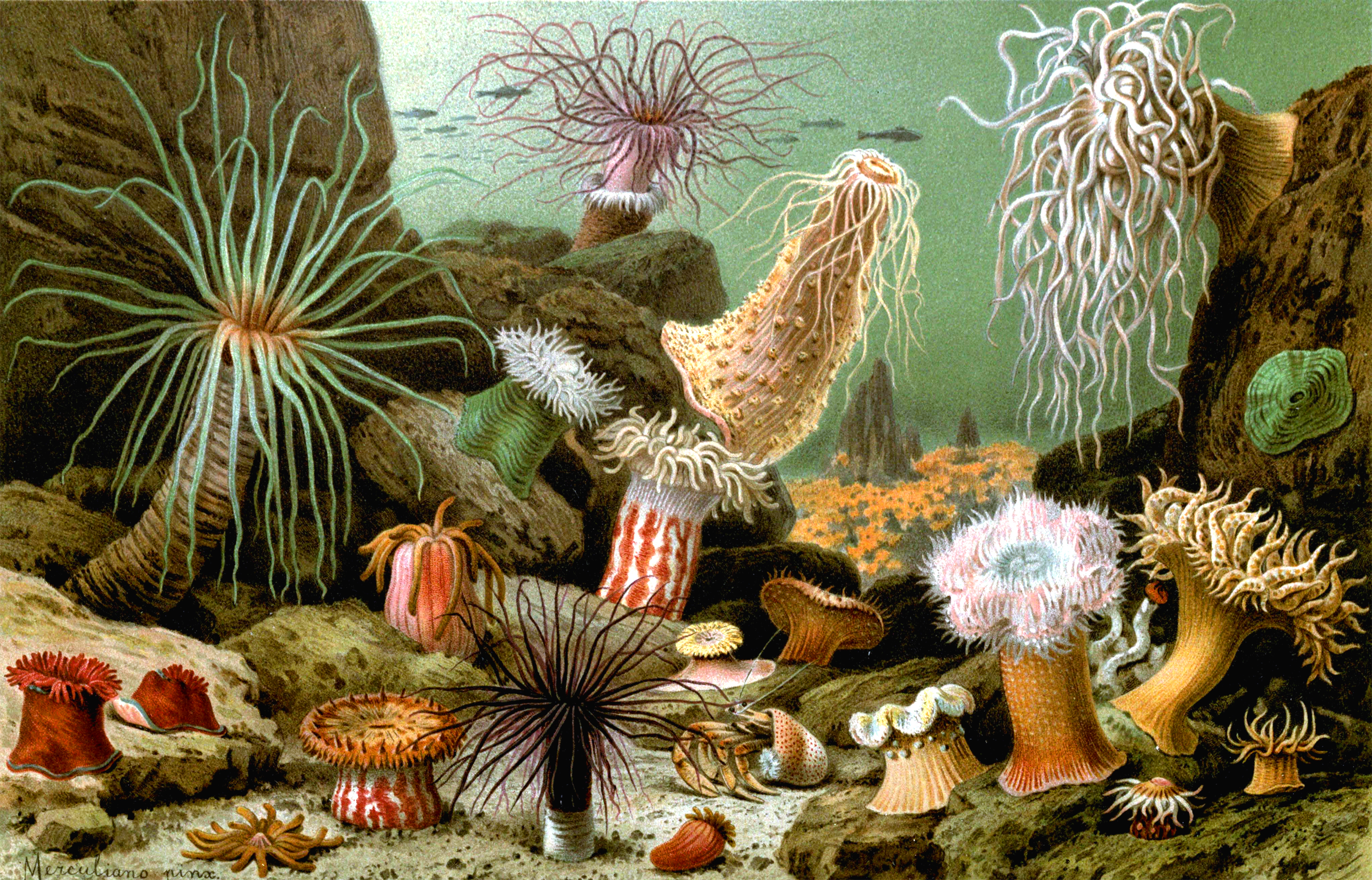
- A selection of sea anemones, painted by Giacomo Merculiano, 1893

Scientific classification
- Kingdom: Animalia
- Phylum: Cnidaria
- Subphylum: Anthozoa
- Class: Hexacorallia
- Order: Actiniaria; Hertwig, 1882

Suborders
- Enthemonae; Anenthemonae; Helenmonae

Diversity
- 46 families

= Sea anemone =

Sea anemone Temporal range: 508–0 Ma Upper Cambrian to Present

Marine animals of the order Actiniaria

Sea anemones (/əˈnɛm.ə.niː/ ə-NEM-ə-nee) are a group of predatory marine invertebrate animals constituting the order Actiniaria. Because of their colourful appearance, they are named after the Anemone, a terrestrial flowering plant. Sea anemones are classified in the phylum Cnidaria, class Anthozoa, subclass Hexacorallia. As cnidarians, sea anemones are related to corals, jellyfish, tube-dwelling anemones, and Hydra. Unlike jellyfish, sea anemones do not have a medusa stage in their life cycle.

A typical sea anemone is a single polyp attached to a hard surface by its base, but some species live in soft sediment, and a few float near the surface of the water. The polyp has a columnar trunk topped by an oral disc with a ring of tentacles and a central mouth. The tentacles can be retracted inside the body cavity or expanded to catch passing prey. They are armed with cnidocytes (stinging cells). In many species, additional nourishment comes from a symbiotic relationship with single-celled dinoflagellates, with zooxanthellae, or with green algae, zoochlorellae, that live within the cells. Some species of sea anemone live in association with clownfish, hermit crabs, small fish, or other animals to their mutual benefit.

Sea anemones breed by liberating sperm and eggs through the mouth into the sea. The resulting fertilized eggs develop into planula larvae which, after being planktonic for a while, settle on the seabed and develop directly into juvenile polyps. Sea anemones also breed asexually, by breaking in half or into smaller pieces which regenerate into polyps. Sea anemones are sometimes kept in reef aquariums; the global trade in marine ornamentals for this purpose is expanding and threatens sea anemone populations in some localities, as the trade depends on collection from the wild.

== Anatomy ==
Sea anemone anatomy.: 1. Tentacles 2. Mouth 3. Retracting muscles 4. Gonads 5. acontial filaments 6. Pedal disk 7. Ostium 8. Coelenteron 9. Sphincter muscle 10. Mesentery 11. Column 12. Pharynx

A typical sea anemone is a sessile polyp attached at the base to the surface beneath it by an adhesive foot, called a basal or pedal disc, with a column-shaped body topped by an oral disc. Most are from 1 to 5 cm (0.4 to 2.0 in) in diameter and 1.5 to 10 cm (0.6 to 3.9 in) in length, but they are inflatable and vary greatly in dimensions. Some are very large; Urticina columbiana and Stichodactyla mertensii can both exceed 1 metre (3.3 ft) in diameter and Metridium farcimen a metre in length. Some species burrow in soft sediment and lack a basal disc, having instead a bulbous lower end, the physa, which anchors them in place.

The column or trunk is generally more or less cylindrical and may be plain and smooth or may bear specialised structures; these include solid papillae (fleshy protuberances), adhesive papillae, cinclides (slits), and small protruding vesicles. In some species the part immediately below the oral disc is constricted and is known as the capitulum. When the animal contracts, the oral disc, tentacles and capitulum fold inside the pharynx and are held in place by a strong bone all the way up the column. There may be a fold in the body wall, known as a parapet, at this point, and this parapet covers and protects the anemone when it is retracted.

A tomato clownfish in a sea anemone

The oral disc has a central mouth, usually slit-shaped, surrounded by one or more whorls of tentacles. The ends of the slit lead to grooves in the wall of the pharynx known as siphonoglyphs; there are usually two of these grooves, but some groups have a single one. The tentacles are generally tapered and often tipped by a pore, but in some species they are branched, club-tipped, or reduced to low knobs. The tentacles are armed with many cnidocytes, cells that are both defensive and used to capture prey. Cnidocytes contain stinging nematocysts, capsule-like organelles capable of everting suddenly, giving the phylum Cnidaria its name. Each nematocyst contains a small venom vesicle filled with actinotoxins, an inner filament, and an external sensory hair. A touch to the hair mechanically triggers a cell explosion, which launches a harpoon-like structure that attaches to the organism that triggered it, and injects a dose of venom in the flesh of the aggressor or prey. At the base of the tentacles in some species, primarily aggregating anemones, lie acrorhagi, elongated inflatable tentacle-like organs armed with cnidocytes, that can flail around and fend off other encroaching anemones; one or both anemones can be driven off or suffer injury in such battles.

Many sea anemones also have acontia, thin filaments covered in cnidae that can be ejected and retracted for defence.

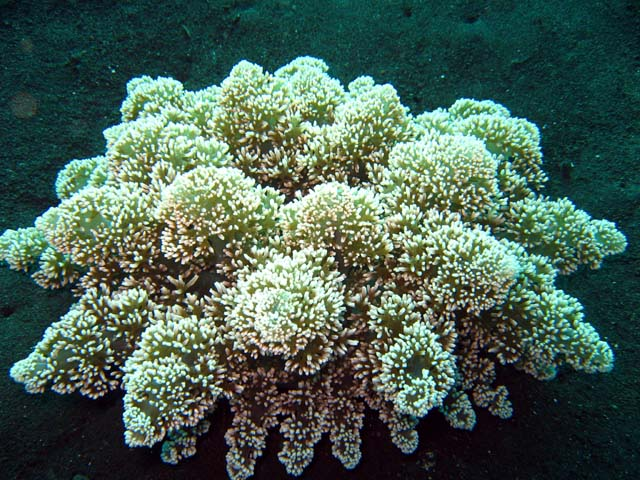
Actinodendron arboreum, the hell's-fire anemone

The venom is a mix of toxins, including neurotoxins, that paralyzes the prey so the anemone can move it to the mouth for digestion inside the gastrovascular cavity. Actinotoxins are highly toxic to prey species of fish and crustaceans. However, Amphiprioninae (clownfish), small banded fish in various colours, are not affected by their host anemone's sting and shelter themselves from predators among its tentacles. Several other species have similar adaptations and are also unaffected (see Mutualistic relationships). Most sea anemones are harmless to humans, but a few highly toxic species (notably Actinodendron arboreum, Phyllodiscus semoni and Stichodactyla spp.) have caused severe injuries and are potentially lethal.

=== Digestive system ===
Sea anemones have what can be described as an incomplete gut: the gastrovascular cavity functions as a stomach and possesses a single opening to the outside, which operates as both a mouth and anus. Waste and undigested matter are excreted through this opening. The mouth is typically slit-like in shape and bears a groove at one or both ends. The groove, termed a siphonoglyph, is ciliated, and helps to move food particles inwards and circulate water through the gastrovascular cavity.

The mouth opens into a flattened pharynx. This consists of an infolding of the body wall, and is therefore lined by the animal's epidermis. The pharynx typically runs for about one-third the length of the body before opening into the gastrovascular cavity that occupies the remainder of the body.

The gastrovascular cavity itself is divided into several chambers by mesenteries radiating inwards from the body wall. Some of the mesenteries form complete partitions with a free edge at the base of the pharynx, where they connect, but others reach only partway across. The mesenteries are usually found in multiples of twelve and are symmetrically arranged around the central lumen. They have a stomach lining on both sides, separated by a thin layer of mesoglea, and include filaments of tissue specialised for secreting digestive enzymes. In some species, these filaments extend below the lower margin of the mesentery, hanging free in the gastrovascular cavity as thread-like acontial filaments. These acontia are armed with nematocysts and can be extruded through cinclides, blister-like holes in the wall of the column, for use in defence.

=== Musculature and nervous system ===
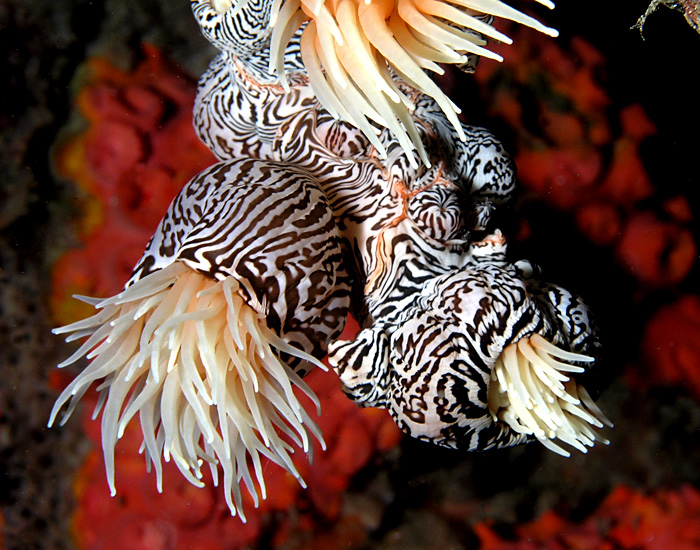
Striped colonial anemone

A primitive nervous system, without centralization, coordinates the processes involved in maintaining homeostasis, as well as biochemical and physical responses to various stimuli. There are two nerve nets, one in the epidermis and one in the gastrodermis; these unite at the pharynx, the junctions of the septa with the oral disc and the pedal disc, and across the mesogloea. No specialized sense organs are present, but sensory cells include nematocysts and chemoreceptors.

The muscles and nerves are much simpler than those of most other animals, although more specialised than in other cnidarians, such as corals. Cells in the outer layer (epidermis) and the inner layer (gastrodermis) have microfilaments that group into contractile fibers. These fibers are not true muscles because they are not freely suspended in the body cavity as they are in more developed animals. Longitudinal fibres are found in the tentacles and oral disc, and also within the mesenteries, where they can contract the whole length of the body. Circular fibers are found in the body wall and, in some species, around the oral disc, allowing the animal to retract its tentacles into a protective sphincter.

Since the anemone lacks a rigid skeleton, the contractile cells pull against the fluid in the gastrovascular cavity, forming a hydrostatic skeleton. The anemone stabilizes itself by flattening its pharynx, which acts as a valve, keeping the gastrovascular cavity at a constant volume and making it rigid. When the longitudinal muscles relax, the pharynx opens and the cilia lining the siphonoglyphs beat, wafting water inwards and refilling the gastrovascular cavity. In general, the sea anemone inflates its body to extend its tentacles and feed, and deflates it when resting or disturbed. The inflated body is also used to anchor the animal inside a crevice, burrow or tube.

== Life cycle ==
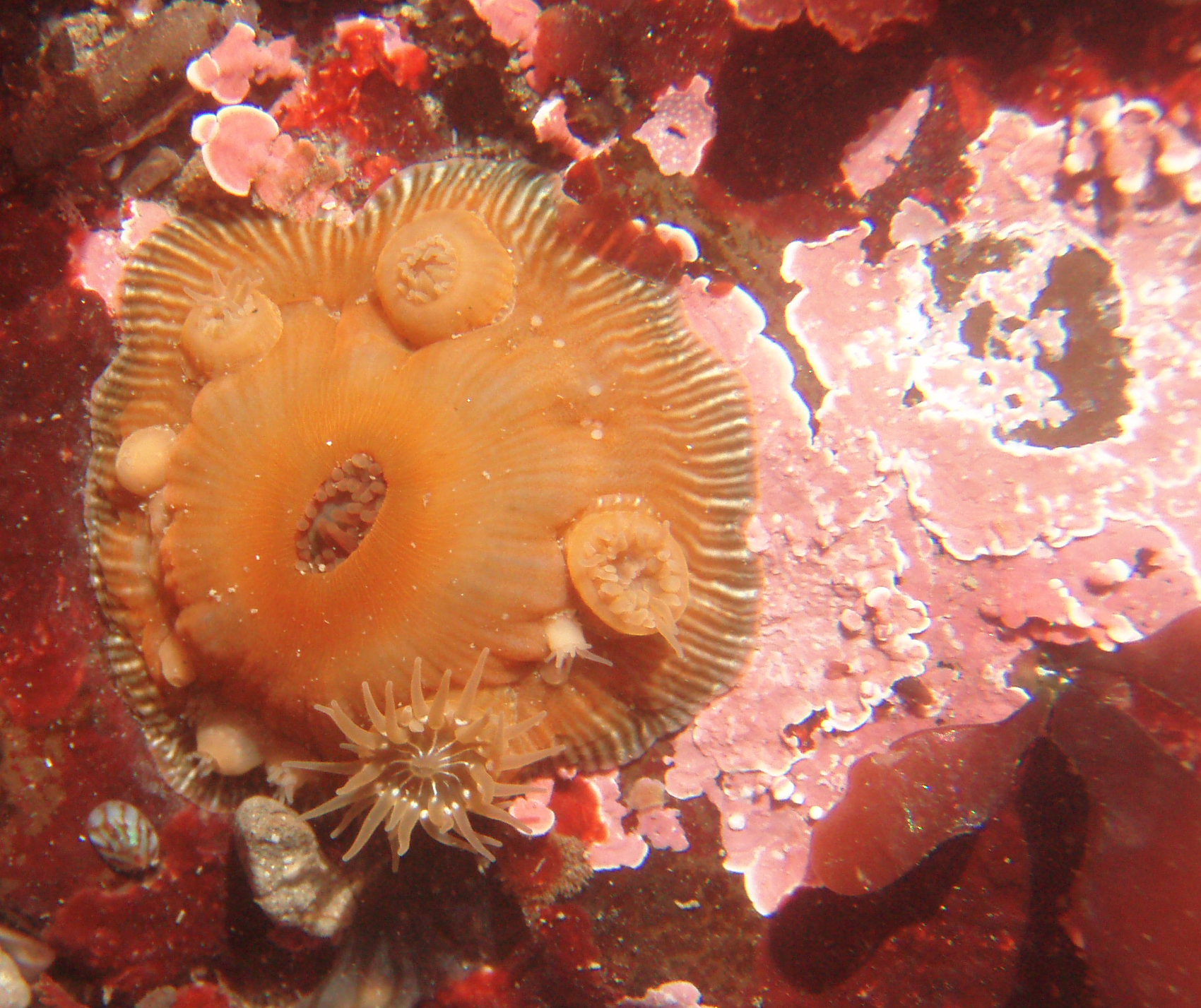
Brooding anemone (Epiactis prolifera) with developing young

Unlike other cnidarians, anemones (and other anthozoans) entirely lack the free-swimming medusal stage of their life cycle; the polyp produces eggs and sperm, and the fertilized egg develops into a planula larva, which develops directly into another polyp. Both sexual and asexual reproduction can occur.

The sexes in sea anemones are separate in some species, while other species are sequential hermaphrodites, changing sex at some stage in their life. The gonads are strips of tissue within the mesenteries. In sexual reproduction, males may release sperm to stimulate females to release eggs, and fertilization occurs, either internally in the gastrovascular cavity or in the water column. The eggs and sperm, or the larvae, usually emerge through the mouth, but in some species, such as Metridium dianthus, may be swept out from the body cavity through the cinclides. In many species the eggs and sperm rise to the surface where fertilisation occurs. The fertilized egg develops into a planula larva, which drifts for a while before sinking to the seabed and undergoing metamorphosis into a juvenile sea anemone. Some larvae preferentially settle onto certain suitable substrates; the mottled anemone (Urticina crassicornis) for example, settles onto green algae, perhaps attracted by a biofilm on the surface.

The brooding anemone (Epiactis prolifera) is gynodioecious, starting life as a female and later becoming hermaphroditic, so that populations consist of females and hermaphrodites. As a female, the eggs can develop parthenogenetically into female offspring without fertilisation, and as a hermaphrodite, the eggs are routinely self-fertilised. The larvae emerge from the anemone's mouth and tumble down the column, lodging in a fold near the pedal disc. Here they develop and grow, remaining for about three months before crawling off to start independent lives.

Sea anemones have great powers of regeneration and can reproduce asexually, by budding, fragmentation, or longitudinal or transverse binary fission. Some species such as certain Anthopleura divide longitudinally, pulling themselves apart, resulting in groups of individuals with identical colouring and markings. Transverse fission is less common, but occurs in Anthopleura stellula and Gonactinia prolifera, with a rudimentary band of tentacles appearing halfway up the column before it splits horizontally. Some species can also reproduce by pedal laceration. In this process, a ring of material may break off from the pedal disc at the base of the column, which then fragments, the pieces regenerating into new clonal individuals. Alternatively, fragments detach separately as the animal creeps across a surface. In Metridium dianthus, fragmentation rates were higher in individuals living among live mussels than among dead shells, and all the new individuals had tentacles within three weeks.

The sea anemone Aiptasia diaphana displays sexual plasticity. Thus asexually produced clones derived from a single founder individual can contain both male and female individuals (ramets). When eggs and sperm (gametes) are formed, they can produce zygotes derived from "selfing" (within the founding clone) or out-crossing, which then develop into swimming planula larvae. Anemones tend to grow and reproduce relatively slowly. The magnificent sea anemone (Heteractis magnifica), for example, may live for decades, with one individual surviving in captivity for eighty years.

== Behaviour and ecology ==
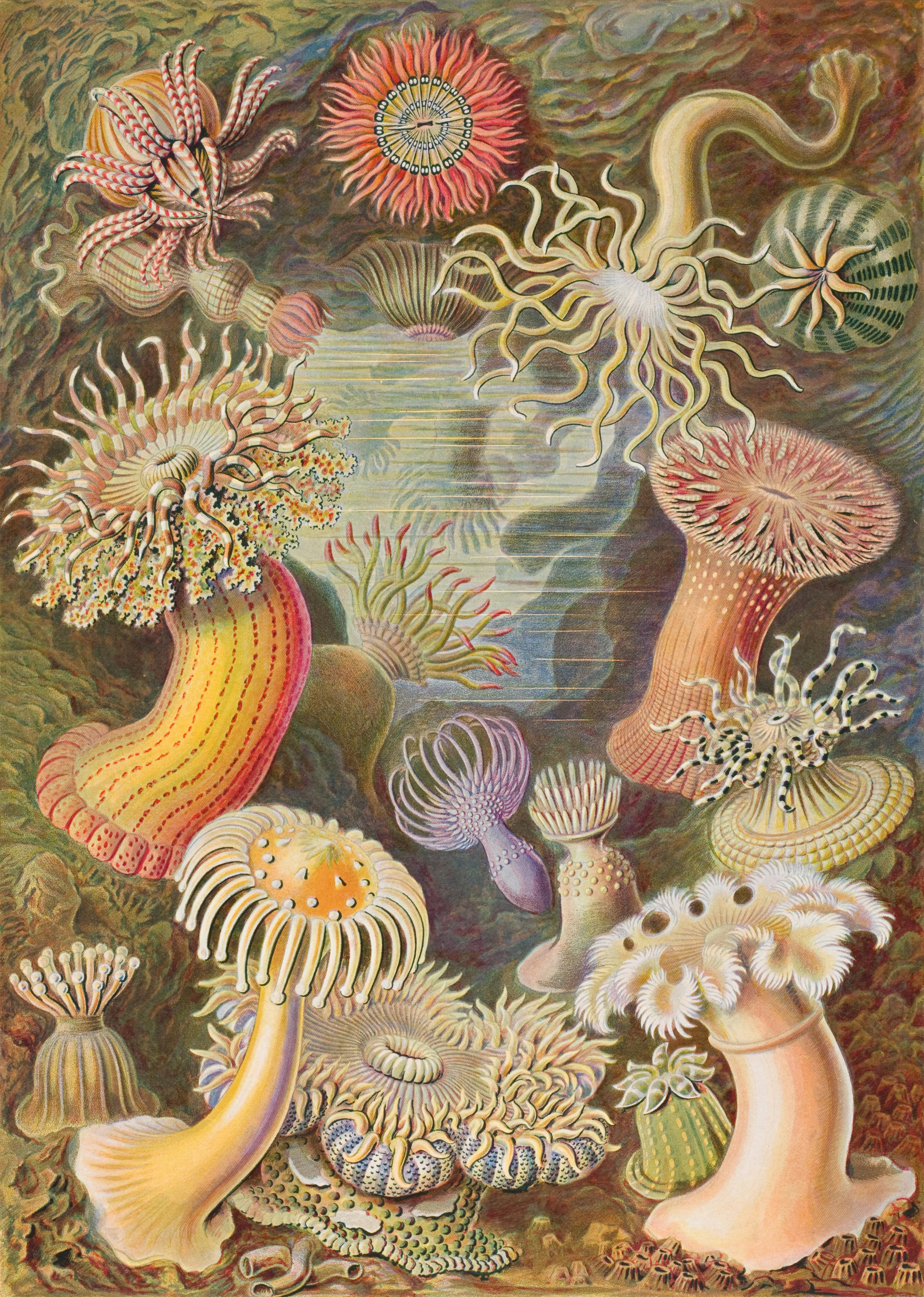
Assortment of sea anemones from Ernst Haeckel's Kunstformen der Natur

=== Movement ===
A sea anemone is capable of changing its shape dramatically. The column and tentacles have longitudinal, transverse and diagonal sheets of muscle and can lengthen and contract, as well as bend and twist. The gullet and mesenteries can evert (turn inside out), or the oral disc and tentacles can retract inside the gullet, with the sphincter closing the aperture; during this process, the gullet folds transversely and water is discharged through the mouth.

=== Locomotion ===
Although some species of sea anemone burrow in soft sediment, the majority are mainly sessile, attaching to a hard surface with their pedal disc, and tend to stay in the same spot for weeks or months at a time. They can move, however, being able to creep around on their bases; this gliding can be seen with time-lapse photography but the motion is so slow as to be almost imperceptible to the naked eye. The process resembles the locomotion of a gastropod mollusc, a wave of contraction moving from the functionally posterior portion of the foot towards the front edge, which detaches and moves forwards. Sea anemones can also cast themselves loose from the substrate and drift to a new location. Gonactinia prolifera is unusual in that it can both walk and swim; walking is by making a series of short, looping steps, rather like a caterpillar, attaching its tentacles to the substrate and drawing its base closer; swimming is done by rapid movements of the tentacles beating synchronously like oar strokes. Stomphia coccinea can swim by flexing its column, and the sea onion anemone inflates and casts itself loose, adopting a spherical shape and allowing itself to be rolled about by the waves and currents. There are no truly pelagic sea anemones, but some stages in the life cycle post-metamorphosis are able, in response to certain environmental factors, to cast themselves off and have a free-living stage that aids in their dispersal.

The sea onion Paranthus rapiformis lives on subtidal mud flats and burrows into the sediment, holding itself in place by expanding its basal disc to form an anchor. If it gets washed out of its burrow by strong currents, it contracts into a pearly glistening ball which rolls about. Tube-dwelling anemones, which live in parchment-like tubes, are in the anthozoan subclass Ceriantharia, and are only distantly related to sea anemones.

=== Feeding and diet ===
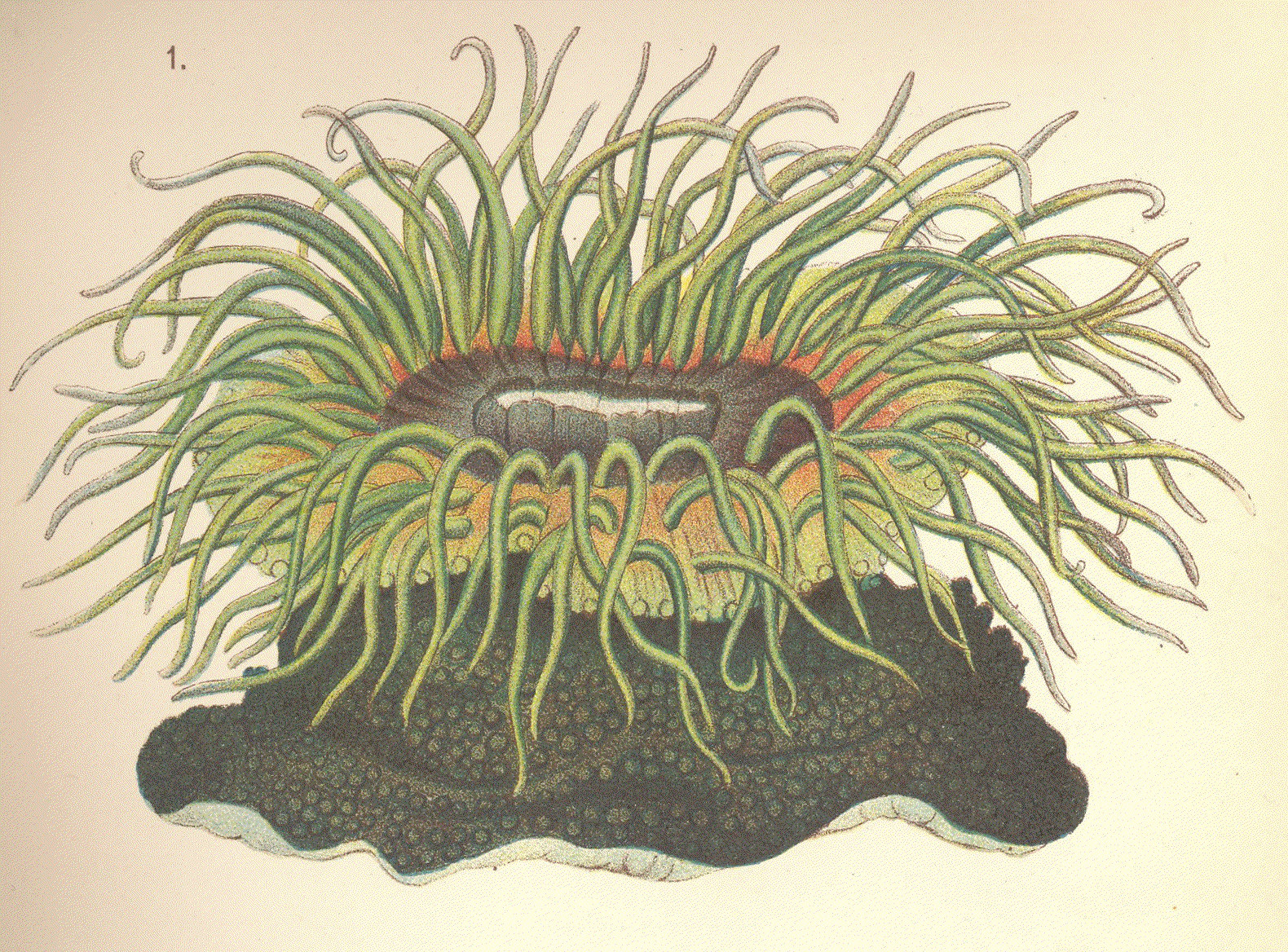
Tentacles of Aulactinia veratra catch passing prey and thrust it into the mouth in the middle of the oral disc.

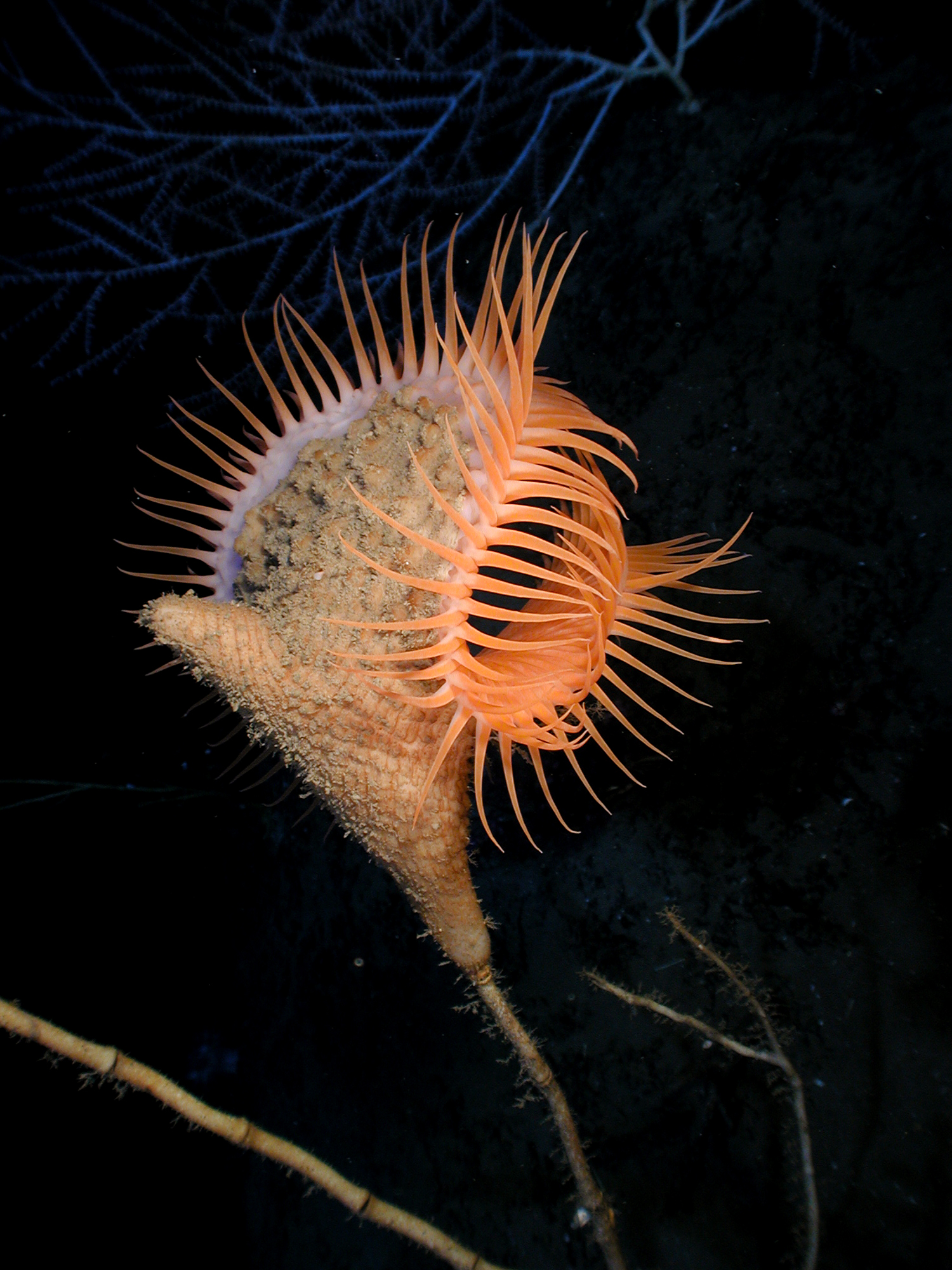
The Venus flytrap sea anemone is a suspension feeder and orients itself to face the current.

Sea anemones are typically predators, ensnaring prey of suitable size that comes within reach of their tentacles and immobilizing it with the aid of their nematocysts. The prey is then transported to the mouth and thrust into the pharynx. The lips can stretch to aid in prey capture and can accommodate larger items such as crabs, dislodged molluscs and even small fish. Stichodactyla helianthus is reported to trap sea urchins by enfolding them in its carpet-like oral disc. A few species are parasitic on other marine organisms. One of these is Peachia quinquecapitata, the larvae of which develop inside the medusae of jellyfish, feeding on their gonads and other tissues, before being liberated into the sea as free-living juvenile anemones.

=== Mutualistic relationships ===
Although anemones are animals and are incapable of photosynthesis, many sea anemones have formed an important facultative mutualistic relationship with certain single-celled algae species that reside in the animals' gastrodermal cells, especially in the tentacles and oral disc. These algae may be either zooxanthellae, zoochlorellae or both. The sea anemone benefits from the products of the algae's photosynthesis, namely oxygen and food in the form of glycerol, glucose and alanine; the algae in turn are assured a reliable exposure to sunlight and protection from micro-feeders, which the sea anemones actively maintain. The algae also benefit by being protected by the sea anemone's stinging cells, reducing the likelihood of being eaten by herbivores. In the aggregating anemone (Anthopleura elegantissima), the colour of the anemone is largely dependent on the proportions and identities of the zooxanthellae and zoochlorellae present. The hidden anemone (Lebrunia coralligens) has a whorl of seaweed-like pseudotentacles, rich in zooxanthellae, and an inner whorl of tentacles. A daily rhythm sees the pseudotentacles spread widely in the daytime for photosynthesis, but they are retracted at night, at which time the tentacles expand to search for prey.

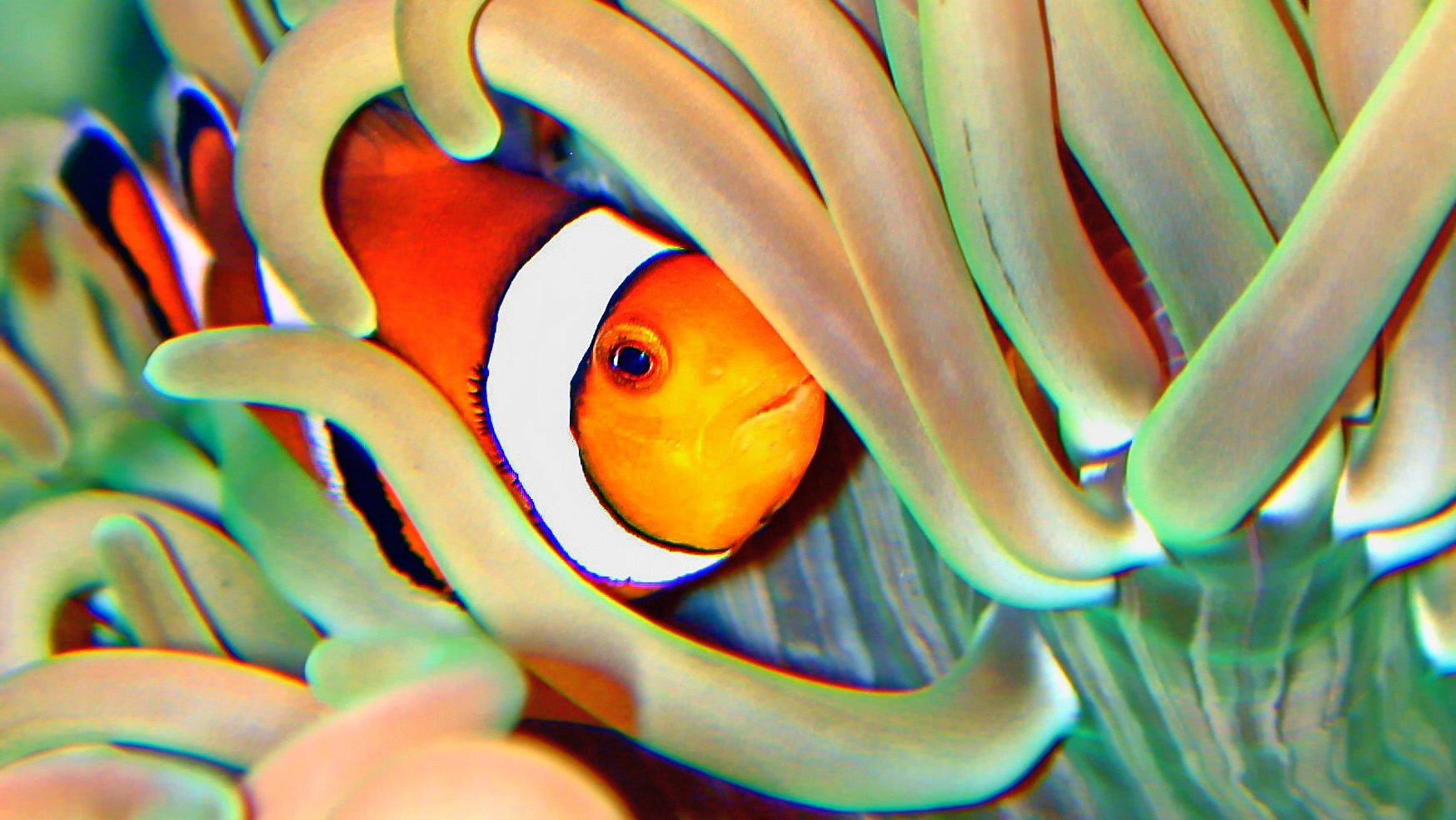
Ocellaris clownfish among the tentacles of a sebae anemone

Several species of fish and invertebrates live in symbiotic or mutualistic relationships with sea anemones, most famously the clownfish. The symbiont receives the protection from predators provided by the anemone's stinging cells, and the anemone utilises the nutrients present in its faeces. Other animals that associate with sea anemones include cardinalfish (such as Banggai cardinalfish), juvenile threespot dascyllus, incognito (or anemone) goby, juvenile painted greenling, various crabs (such as Inachus phalangium, Mithraculus cinctimanus and Neopetrolisthes), shrimp (such as certain Alpheus, Lebbeus, Periclimenes and Thor), opossum shrimp (such as Heteromysis and Leptomysis), and various marine snails.

Two of the more unusual relationships are those between certain anemones (such as Adamsia, Calliactis and Neoaiptasia) and hermit crabs or snails, and Bundeopsis or Triactis anemones and Lybia boxing crabs. In the former, the anemones live on the shell of the hermit crab or snail. In the latter, the small anemones are carried in the claws of the boxing crab.

=== Habitats ===
Sea anemones are found in both deep oceans and shallow coastal waters worldwide. The greatest diversity is in the tropics, although there are many species adapted to relatively cold waters. The majority of species cling on to rocks, shells or submerged timber, often hiding in cracks or under seaweed, but some burrow into sand and mud, and a few are pelagic. Deep sea mining companies are pressuring governments to let them mine on the bottom of the oceans. By 2024, several companies could begin mining projects in the deep sea. The ecological damage to the habitat of sea anemones and other organisms could be enormous, dangerous and irreversible.

== Relationship with humans ==
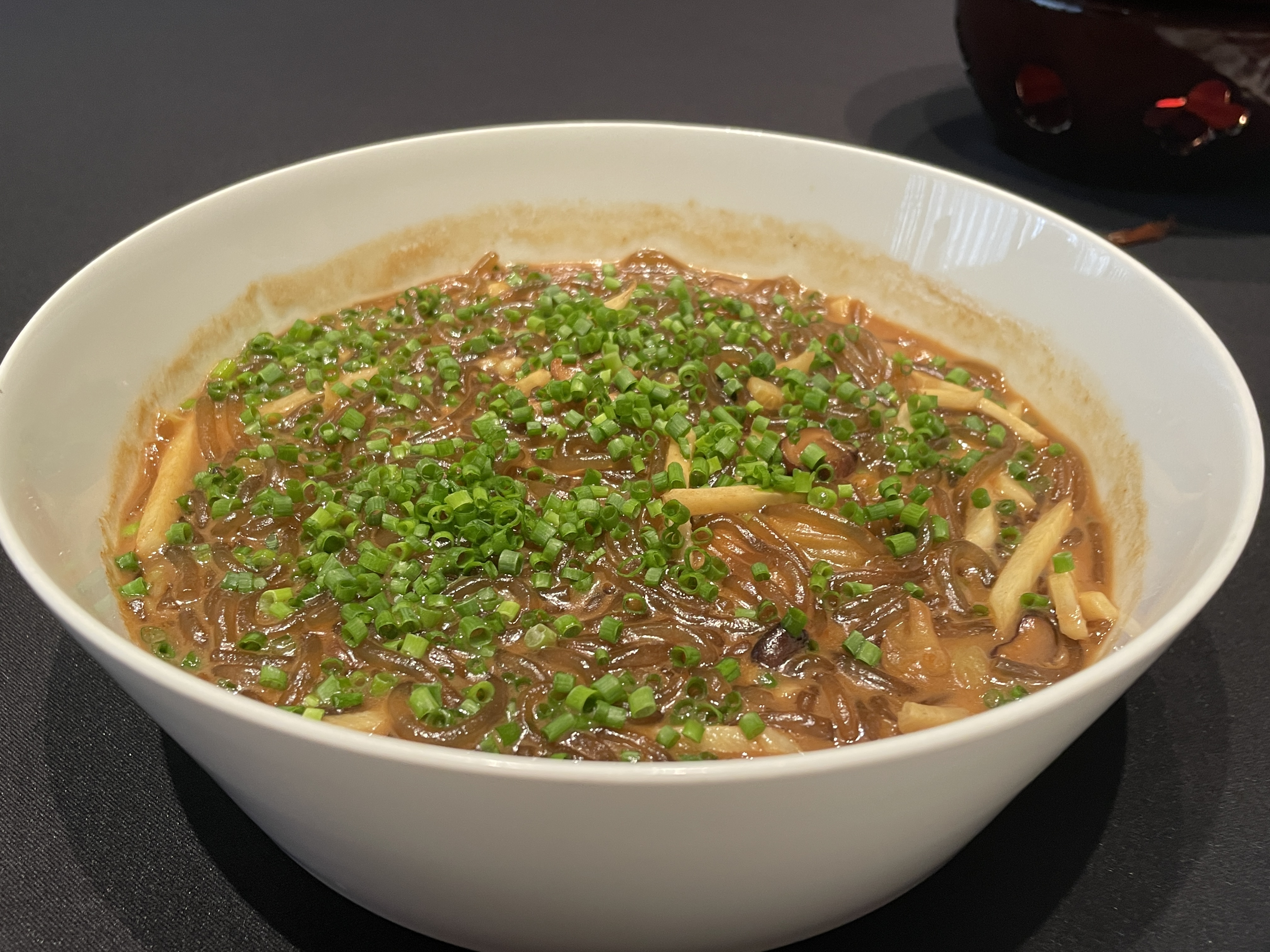
Shasuan Doumian (Sea anemones with Mung Bean noodles)

Sea anemones and their attendant anemone fish can make attractive aquarium exhibits, and both are often harvested from the wild as adults or juveniles. These fishing activities significantly impact the populations of anemones and anemone fish by drastically reducing the densities of each in exploited areas. Besides their collection from the wild for use in reef aquaria, sea anemones are also threatened by alterations to their environment. Those living in shallow-water coastal locations are affected directly by pollution and siltation, and indirectly by the effect these have on their photosynthetic symbionts and the prey on which they feed.

In southwestern Spain and Sardinia, the snakelocks anemone (Anemonia viridis) is consumed as a delicacy. The whole animal is marinated in vinegar, then coated in a batter similar to that used to make calamari, and deep-fried in olive oil. Anemones are also a source of food for fisherman communities on the east coast of Sabah, Borneo, as well as in the Thousand Islands of Southeast Asia (as rambu-rambu) and in Taizhou, Zhejiang (as 沙蒜 Shasuan).

In Thailand, in some areas such as Ko Samui and Ko Phangan, there is a local curry soup dish known as kaeng khua hed lub (Thai: แกงคั่วเห็ดหลุบ). "Hed lub" refers to the sea anemone Stichodactyla haddoni. However, this species is classified as a protected animal in Thailand.

== Fossil record ==
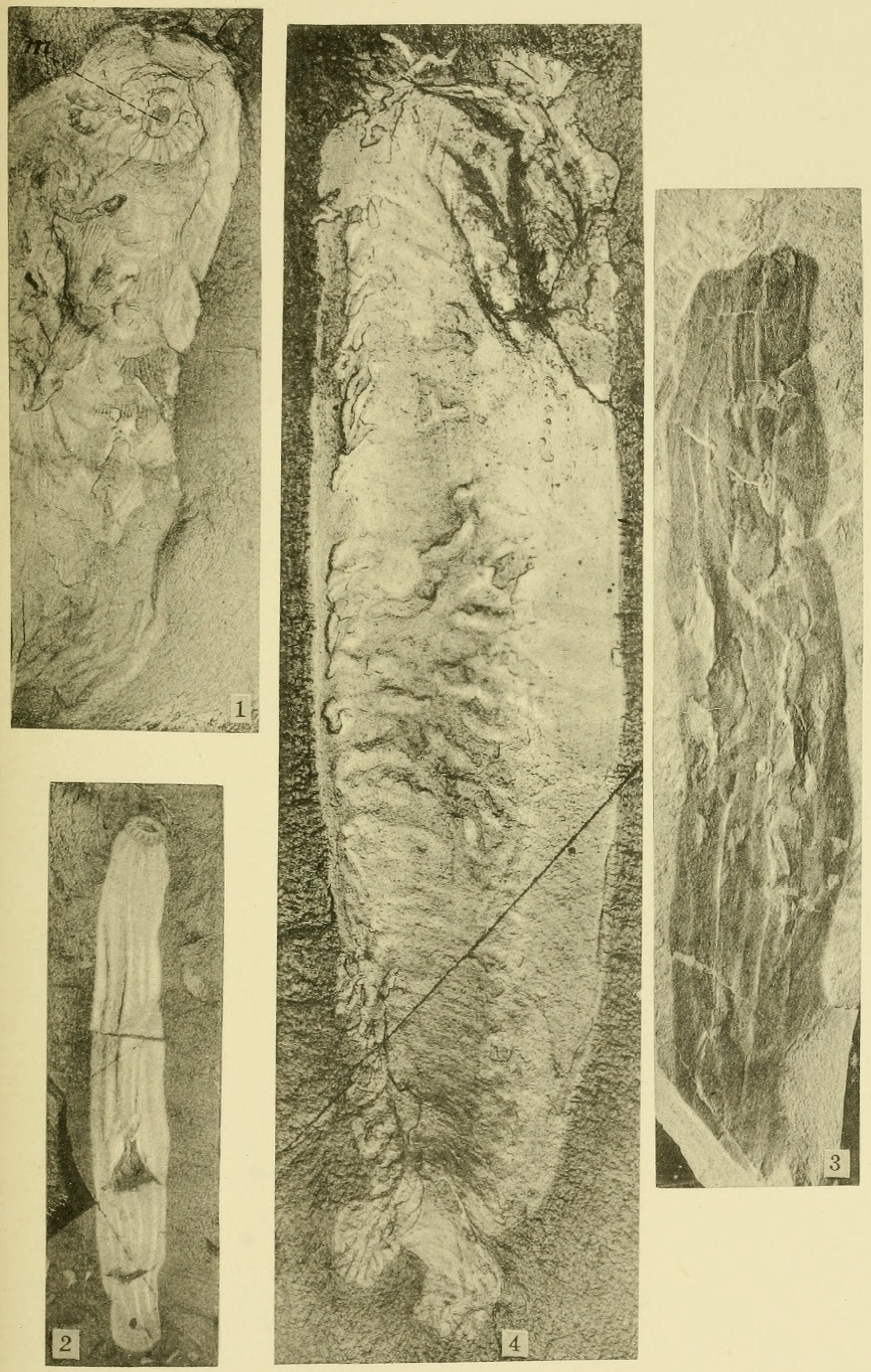
(2) and (3) Mackenzia, Middle Cambrian. Sea anemones do not fossilize well, having no hard parts, and this one was mistakenly identified as a sea cucumber.

Most Actiniaria do not form hard parts that can be recognized as fossils, but a few fossils of sea anemones do exist; Mackenzia, from the Middle Cambrian Burgess Shale of Canada, is the oldest fossil identified as a sea anemone.

In 2024, more than 100 fossils of sea anemones were discovered in Brazil, dating back to the Silurian period. The species, Arenactinia ipuensis, is the oldest anemone in Latin America and the only fossils of soft-bodied anemones that have been preserved in three-dimensional form. Arenactinia fossils contain a wealth of information about the evolution and ethology of anemones during the Paleozoic.

== Taxonomy ==
Sea anemones, order Actiniaria, are classified in the phylum Cnidaria, class Anthozoa, subclass Hexacorallia. Rodriguez et al. proposed a new classification for the Actiniaria based on extensive DNA results.

Suborders and superfamilies included in Actiniaria are:

- Suborder Anenthemonae
  - Superfamily Edwardsioidea
  - Superfamily Actinernoidea
- Suborder Enthemonae
  - Superfamily Actinostoloidea
  - Superfamily Actinioidea
  - Superfamily Metridioidea

== Phylogeny ==
=== External relationships ===
Actiniaria is an order of the subphylum Anthozoa, class Hexacorallia. See Taxonomy of Anthozoa.

=== Internal relationships ===
The relationships of higher-level taxa in Carlgren's classification are re-interpreted as follows:

Carlgren taxon	Phylogenetic result
Protantheae	Sister to Boloceroidaria
Ptychodacteae	Polyphyletic because its members are not recovered as sister taxa; clustered with members of former Endomyaria
Endocoelantheae	Sister to athenarian family Edwardsiidae; together these clades are re-classified as suborder Anenthemonae
Nynantheae	Polyphyletic because of the relationship between Edwardsiidae and Endocoelantheae and because members of Protantheae and Ptychodacteae are recovered as sister to its members
Boloceroidaria	Boloceroides mcmurrichi and Bunodeopsis nested among acontiate taxa; B. daphneae apart from other Actiniaria
Athenaria	Polyphyletic: families formerly in this suborder distributed across tree as sister to former members of Endomyaria, Acontiaria, and Endocoelantheae
Thenaria	Boloceroidaria, Protantheae, Ptychodacteae, and most Athenaria nest within this group
Endomyaria	Paraphyletic: includes Pychodacteae and some Athenaria
Mesomyaria	Polyphyletic: one clade at base of Nynantheae, other lineages are associated with former members of Acontiaria
Acontiaria	Paraphyletic; includes several lineages formerly in Mesomyaria and Athenaria, plus Boloceroidaria and Protantheae

== See also ==
- AETX
- Cangitoxin
- Halcurin
- Sea anemone dermatitis
- Sea anemone neurotoxin
