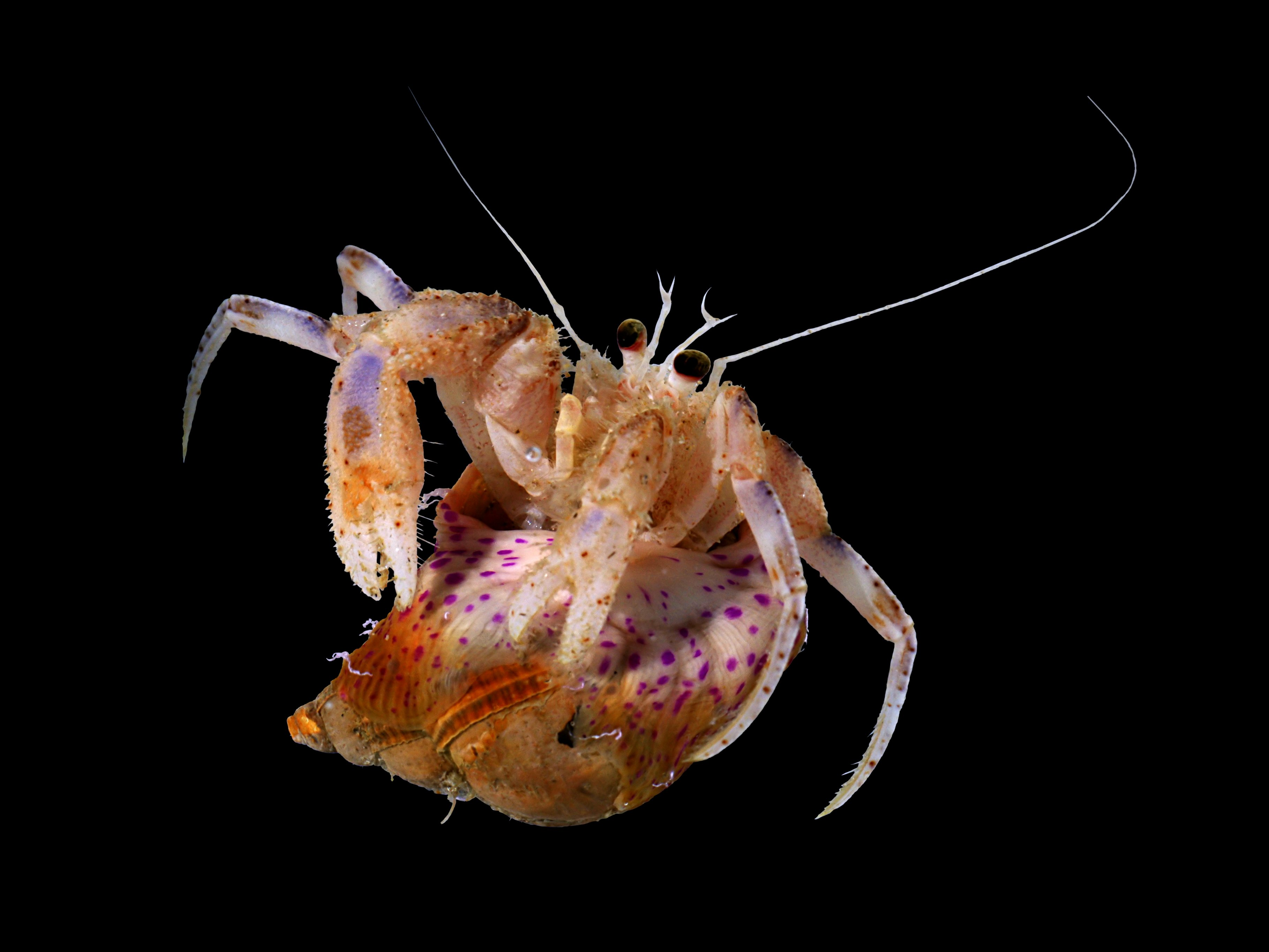
- Pagurus prideaux and Adamsia palliata, here inhabiting a gastropod shell

Conservation status
- Data Deficient (IUCN 3.1) (Mediterranean)

Scientific classification
- Kingdom: Animalia
- Phylum: Cnidaria
- Subphylum: Anthozoa
- Class: Hexacorallia
- Order: Actiniaria
- Family: Hormathiidae
- Genus: Adamsia
- Species: A. palliata

Binomial name
- Adamsia palliata (Müller, 1776)

Synonyms
- List: Actinia carciniopados Otto, 1823; Actinia carcinopados; Actinia carcinopoda; Actinia casciniopados Otto; Actinia maculata Adams, 1800; Actinia palliata; Actinia picta Risso, 1826; Adamsia carciniopados (Otto, 1823); Adamsia carcinopados; Adamsia carcioniopados; Adamsia maculata Johnst.; Cribrina palliata Ehrenberg; Medusa palliata Fabricius, 1779; Sargartia palliata

= Adamsia palliata =

Species of sea anemone

Adamsia palliata is a species of sea anemone in the family Hormathiidae. It is usually found growing on a gastropod shell inhabited by the hermit crab, Pagurus prideaux. The anemone often completely envelops the shell and because of this it is commonly known as the cloak anemone or the hermit-crab anemone.

== Taxonomy ==
In a revision of British Anthozoa in 1981, Manuel applied the name Adamsia carciniopados to this species, attributing it to Otto, 1823. However Cornelius and Ates in 2003 decided that Adamsia palliata was the valid name, attributing it to O.F. Muller, 1776.

== Description ==
A. palliata normally lives on the shell of a sea snail which is housing a hermit crab. The anemone's base is wide and convoluted with lobes that extend around the shell. The edges join together in a suture where the shell is completely encircled. The oral disc and tentacles are orientated downwards beneath the underside of the crab. The basal lobes can extend to about fifteen centimeters while the trunk is only about one centimeter high. The column is fawn tinged with pinkish-purple, paling to white near the parapet. It is covered with vivid magenta spots which are largest in the central portion. There is a narrow pink line round the margin of the parapet and the oral disc and tentacles are white. The tentacles are numerous and about one centimeter long, not fully retractable and arranged in four sub-marginal rows. The mouth is long and oval and protrudes from the disc. When it becomes too large for the shell, the anemone secretes a chitinous membrane at its base. This has the effect of increasing the volume of the shell available to the hermit crab which can then inhabit it for a longer period before needing to find a new home. In one instance, on a shell of Gibbula umbilicalis, this membrane had developed into a pseudo body-whorl as voluminous as the rest of the shell. On the lower part of the column there are specialist cells which emit defensive pink (occasionally white) threads called acontia if the animal is disturbed.

== Distribution and habitat ==
A. palliata is found in shallow parts of the northeast Atlantic Ocean south to the Azores, in the North Sea and the Mediterranean Sea. It occurs wherever its hermit crab host is found, in deep water on sandy flats and particularly favours muddy gravelly bottoms with shell fragments. Off the coast of Norway it was said to be common at a depth of 15 to 20 fathoms (90 to 120 feet; 27 to 37 metres) in 1860. In Norwegian fjords the anemone is observed typically at depths below 10 metres (33 feet).

== Biology ==
A. palliata breeds during the summer months. Several hundred globular golden eggs are ejected into the water column through the mouth and are fertilised externally. Each develops into a planula larva which settles and develops into a juvenile sea anemone. The larva is for some reason drawn to settle on the inner lip of a gastropod shell. At first the larva develops in the same way as a typical sea anemone, but as it grows, its base extends around the gastropod shell until the two lobes meet at the upper side of the lip. The species of shell the anemone chooses varies, and has included Buccinum undatum, Scaphander lignarius, and various Trochidae. It has even been found on a shell of the garden snail Cornu aspersum which had been accidentally washed out to sea. The shell always seem to be tenanted by the hermit crab Pagurus prideaux. Occasionally this anemone is found on empty shells, but this may be explained by the fact that the crab will readily abandon its current shell if it finds a larger or better one to move into. Young specimens of the anemone are able to detach themselves from their shell and re-attach themselves elsewhere, such as another shell, a Laminaria frond or the side of an aquarium.

== Ecology ==
The symbiosis between A. palliata and P. prideaux is beneficial to both. The anemone gains a mobile base and access to food scraps while the crab gains the protection against predators provided by the anemone's nematocysts. It is not an obligate symbiosis however. The anemone has been kept in an aquarium for an extended period on a rock substrate and in 1969, Maynardi and Rossi found a single example of the hermit crab Pagurus excavatus carrying, on its gastropod shell, a specimen of A. palliata and another of Calliactis parasitica.
