= Strigosella =

Strigosella may refer to:

- Strigosella (gastropod), a genus of mollusks in the family Trochidae
- Strigosella (plant), a genus of flowering plants in the family Brassicaceae
