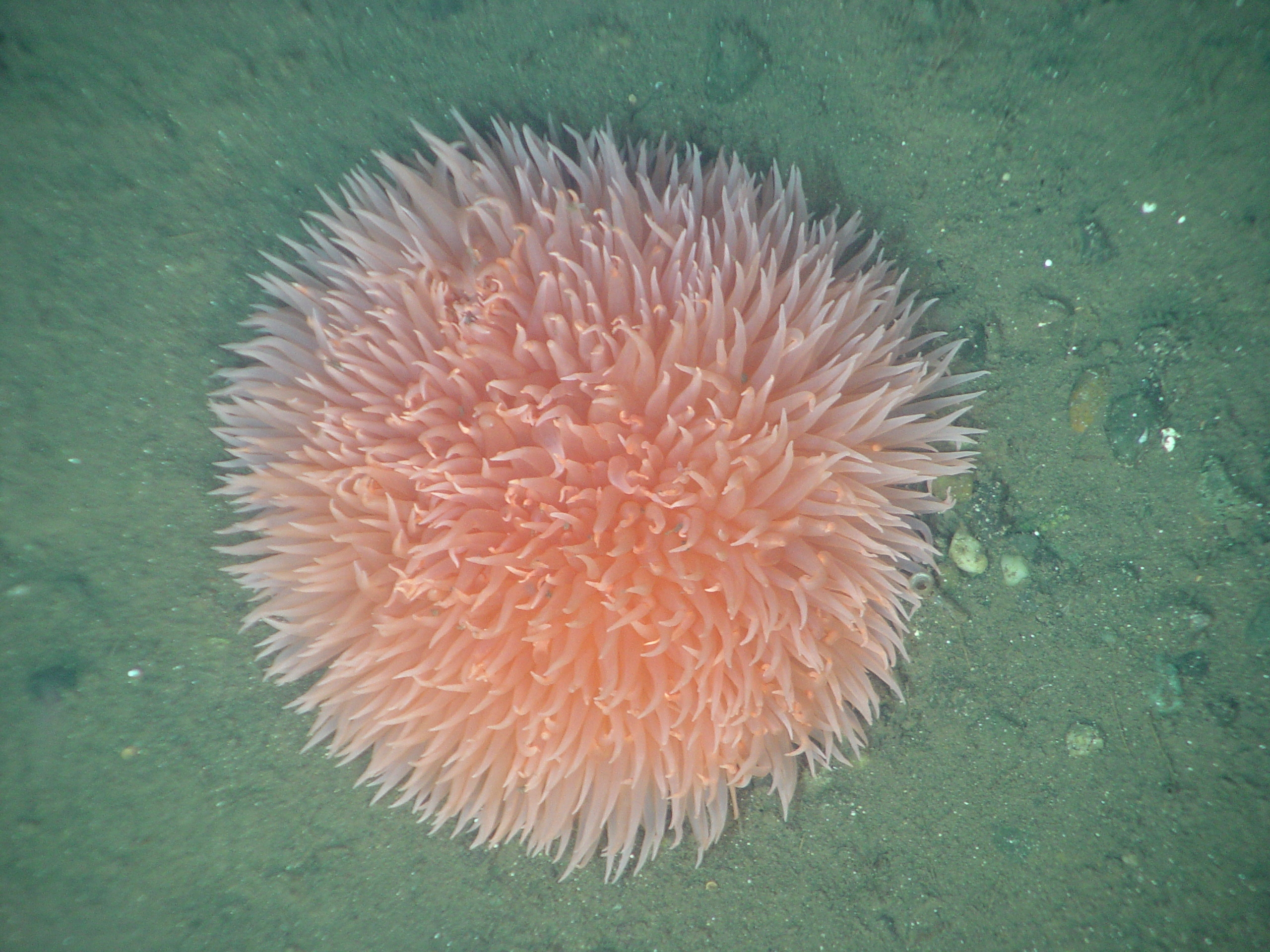
- Liponema brevicornis

Scientific classification
- Kingdom: Animalia
- Phylum: Cnidaria
- Subphylum: Anthozoa
- Class: Hexacorallia
- Order: Actiniaria
- Family: Liponematidae
- Genus: Liponema; Hertwig, 1882

Species
- See text

= Liponema =

Genus of sea anemones

Liponema is a genus of sea anemones, in the family Liponematidae.

== Characteristics ==
Members of this genus have a wide base and a short, smooth column. The tentacles are short and very numerous, covering the whole oral disc. Each tentacle has a sphincter at its base which, when it contracts, causes the tentacle to be shed. The siphonoglyphs are well developed and the mesenteries are in perfect pairs. The cnidocytes consist of spirocysts, basitrichs and microbasic p-mastigophors.

== Species ==
The following species are recognized in the World Register of Marine Species:

- Liponema brevicorne (McMurrich, 1893)
- Liponema multicorne (Verrill, 1880)
- Liponema multiporum Hertwig, 1882
