= Allantactis =

Scientific classification
- Kingdom: Animalia
- Phylum: Cnidaria
- Subphylum: Anthozoa
- Class: Hexacorallia
- Order: Actiniaria
- Family: Hormathiidae
- Genus: Allantactis; Danielssen, 1890
- Species: A. parasitica

Binomial name
- Allantactis parasitica Danielssen, 1890

Synonyms
- Calliactis kroeyeri Danielssen, 1890; Calliactis kroyeri Danielssen, 1890; Calliactis krøyeri Danielssen, 1890

Genus of sea anemones

Allantactis is a monotypic genus of sea anemones, and Allantactis parasitica is the only species in the genus. This sea anemone lives at bathyal depths in the North Atlantic Ocean and has a symbiotic relationship with a gastropod mollusc.

== Description ==
A. parasitica has a strong base and a smooth column with thick walls and no cuticle or perforations of the body wall that are termed cinclides. The margin is distinct and the sphincter powerful. The tentacles are fairly short and arranged in whorls of six, there being a maximum of 96. The oral disc has a central mouth with two broad siphonoglyphs. The six pairs of mesenteries are complete, in that their sheetlike membranes join the gastrodermis of the body wall with that of the pharynx, and are sterile, in that they do not bear gonads. The nematocysts consist of a mixture of spirocysts, basitrichs and microbasic p-mastigophors.

== Ecology ==
The species lives on the abyssal seabed of the North Atlantic at depths of between 725 and 1,100 m (2,400 and 3,600 ft). Although sometimes living attached to a pebble or empty shell, it prefers to attach to the shell of a living gastropod mollusc when available. Sea anemone larvae settling on the seabed do so preferentially on any gastropods that are present, and where the larvae settle onto mud, the presence of gastropods nearby stimulates them to move towards and onto the molluscs. Sometimes as many as six anemones can be found crowded onto the shell of a single living gastropod.

Gastropods with one or two sea anemone on their shells were found to have greater feeding success and more varied stomach contents than those with either no epibionts, or with three or more. The sea anemones also benefited from the mutualism because of the longer time spent in food-rich areas in the deep sea floor, a place where food resources are limited.

The chief predator of gastropods at these depths in the North Atlantic is the starfish Leptasterias polaris. Researchers found that starfish avoided molluscs with anemones on their shells, and that molluscs relied on the presence of their epibionts and did not take evasive action when they encountered the starfish. If their attached anemones were removed, they lost the protection that their toxin-producing nematocysts provided, and were attacked. The sea anemone gained advantage from being an epibiont as it is itself sometimes attacked by the starfish Crossaster papposus, but was able to escape from this predator when attached to a living gastropod mollusc.

Despite living at bathyal depths where no light penetrates, A. parasitica is one of a number of deep sea species that show synchronisation in the release of eggs and sperm to the phases of the moon.
