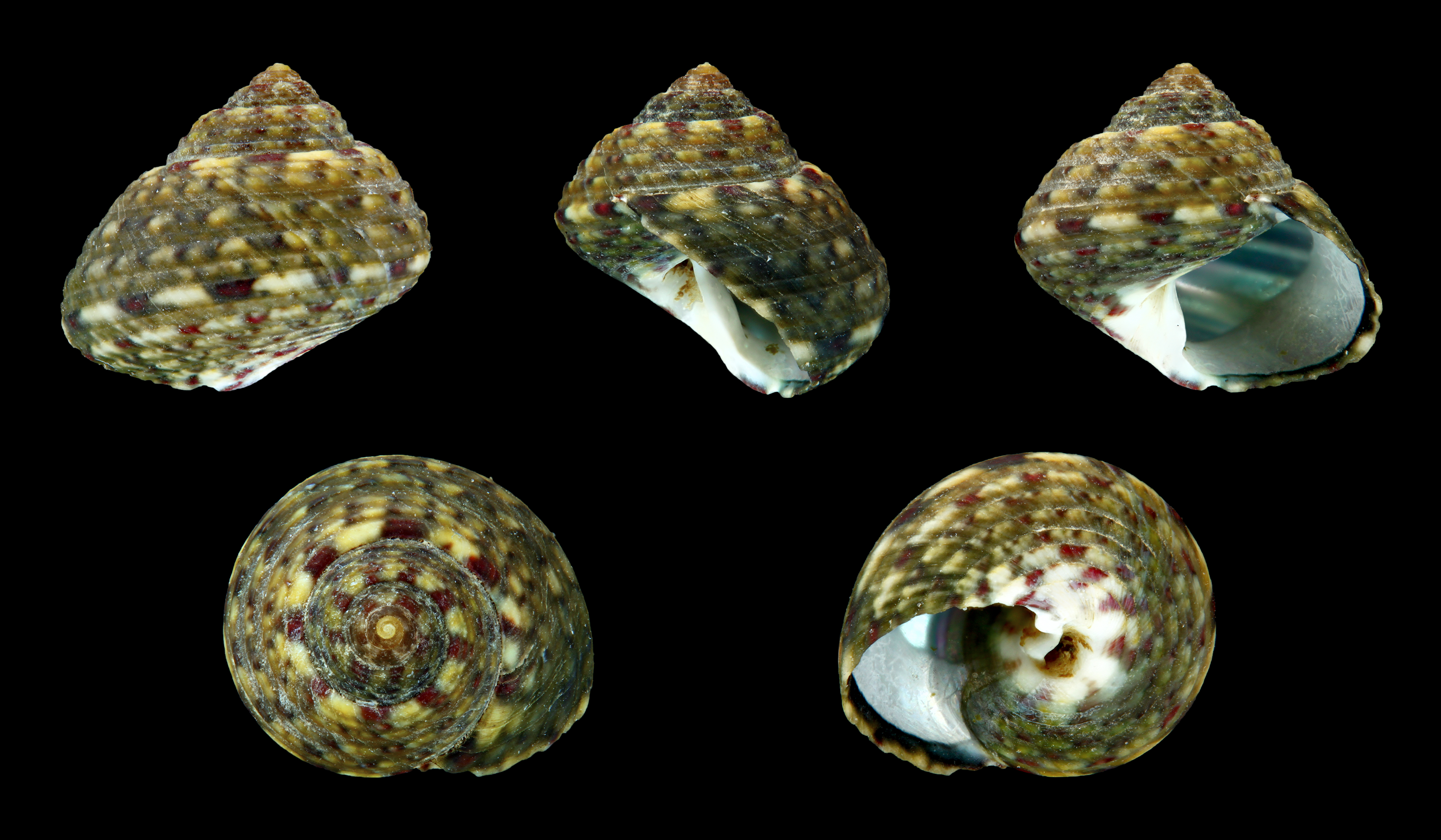
- Shell of Steromphala adriatica

Scientific classification
- Kingdom: Animalia
- Phylum: Mollusca
- Class: Gastropoda
- Subclass: Vetigastropoda
- Order: Trochida
- Family: Trochidae
- Subfamily: Cantharidinae
- Genus: Steromphala
- Species: S. adriatica

Binomial name
- Steromphala adriatica (Philippi, 1844)

Synonyms
- Gibbula adriatica var. tunetana Pallary, 1914; Gibbula adriatica var. tunetana Pallary, 1914; Gibbula conemenosi Monterosato, 1888; Trochus abrodiaetus Nardo, 1847; Trochus adriaticus Philippi, 1844 (original combination); Trochus basteroti Hoernes, 1848; Trochus olivaceus Anton, 1839; Trochus varians Deshayes, 1835; Turbo angulatus Eichwald, 1829; Turbo cremensis Andrzeiewsky, 1832

= Steromphala adriatica =

Species of gastropod

Steromphala adriatica is a species of sea snail, a marine gastropod mollusk in the family Trochidae, the top snails.

== Description ==
The size of the shell varies between 9 mm and 14 mm. The shell is more solid than Gibbula adansonii, generally paler and the base of the shell is whitish. The spiral sculpture is stronger. The penultimate whorl has about 5 well-marked, separated spiral lirae. The body whorl is angulate at the periphery.

== Distribution ==
This species occurs in the Mediterranean Sea and the Sea of Azov.
