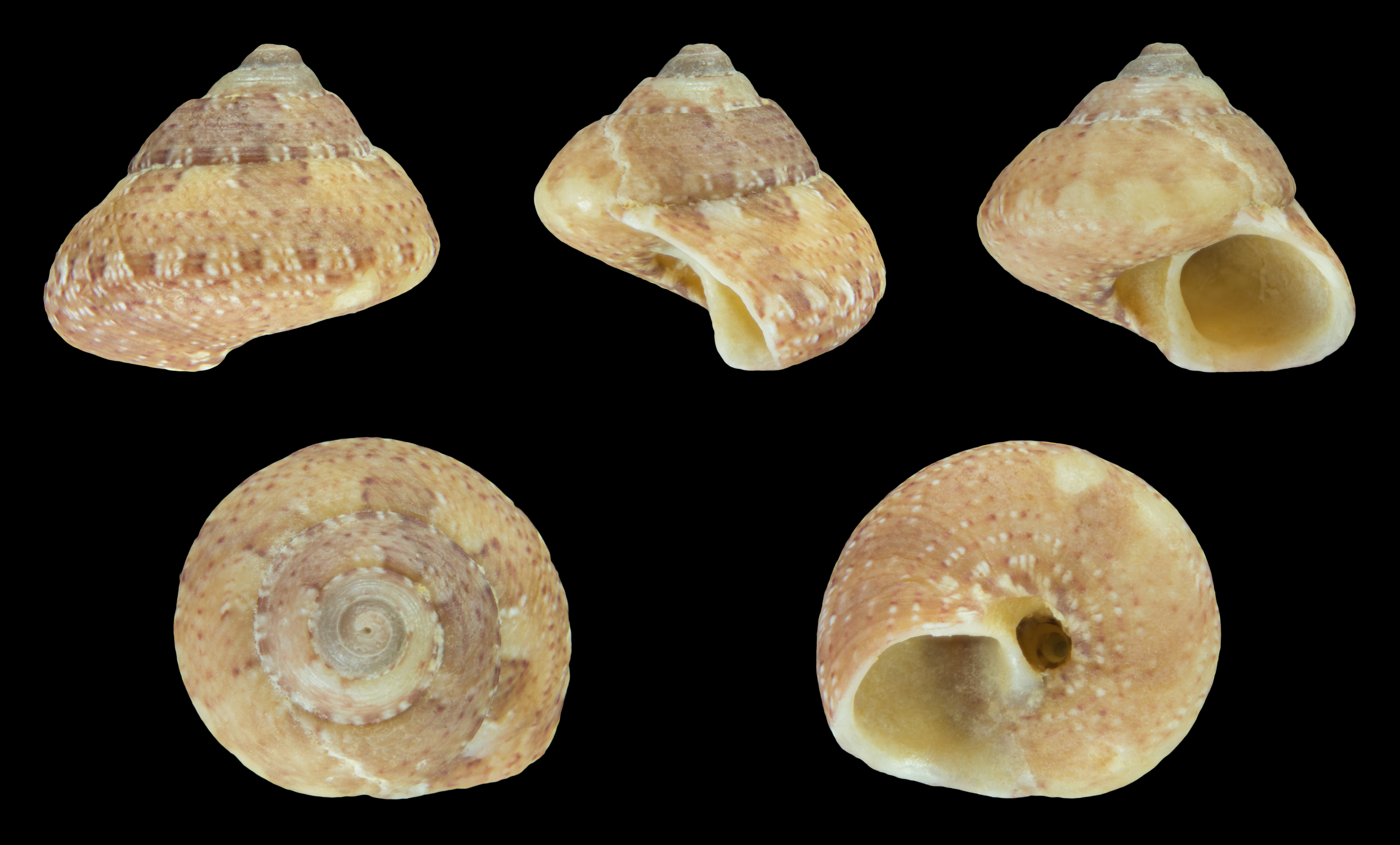
- Five views of a shell of Steromphala varia

Scientific classification
- Kingdom: Animalia
- Phylum: Mollusca
- Class: Gastropoda
- Subclass: Vetigastropoda
- Order: Trochida
- Family: Trochidae
- Subfamily: Cantharidinae
- Genus: Steromphala
- Species: S. varia

Binomial name
- Steromphala varia (Linnaeus, 1758)

Synonyms
- Gibbula depressa Risso, 1826; Gibbula mocquerisi Pallary, 1906; Gibbula varia (Linnaeus, 1758); Gibbula varia var. mandarina Monterosato 1888; Gibbula varia var. marginata Monterosato 1888; Gibbula varia var. tumidosa Monterosato 1888; Gibbula variegata Risso, 1826; Trochus elatus Brusina, 1865; Trochus gibbosulus Brusina, 1865; Trochus laevigatus Gmelin, 1791; Trochus roissyi Payraudeau, 1826; Trochus varius Linnaeus, 1758 (original description); Trochus varius var. marmorata Bucquoy, Dautzenberg & Dollfus 1884

= Steromphala varia =

Species of gastropod

Steromphala varia is a species of sea snail, a marine gastropod mollusk in the family Trochidae, the top snails.

== Description ==
The size of the shell varies between 8 mm and 15 mm. The solid, umbilicate shell has a conical shape. Its color is a dull, lusterless yellowish white or pinkish, with flexuous radiating cinereous or violaceous stripes below the suture. tTe entire surface is finely mottled and dotted with yellowish or violaceous and white. The short spire is conical, not acuminate as in Gibbula ardens and Gibbula umbilicaris. The about six whorls are flattened and separated by slightly impressed sutures. They are encircled by numerous fine striae. The body whorl is obtusely angular at the periphery. The large aperture is very oblique and is smooth within. The oblique columella is straightened. The umbilicus is funnel-shaped and whitish within.

This species is host to the ectoparasites Trochicola entericus Dollfus, 1914 and Lichomolgus trochi Canu, 1899

== Distribution ==
This species occurs in the Mediterranean Sea and in the Atlantic Ocean off Portugal.
