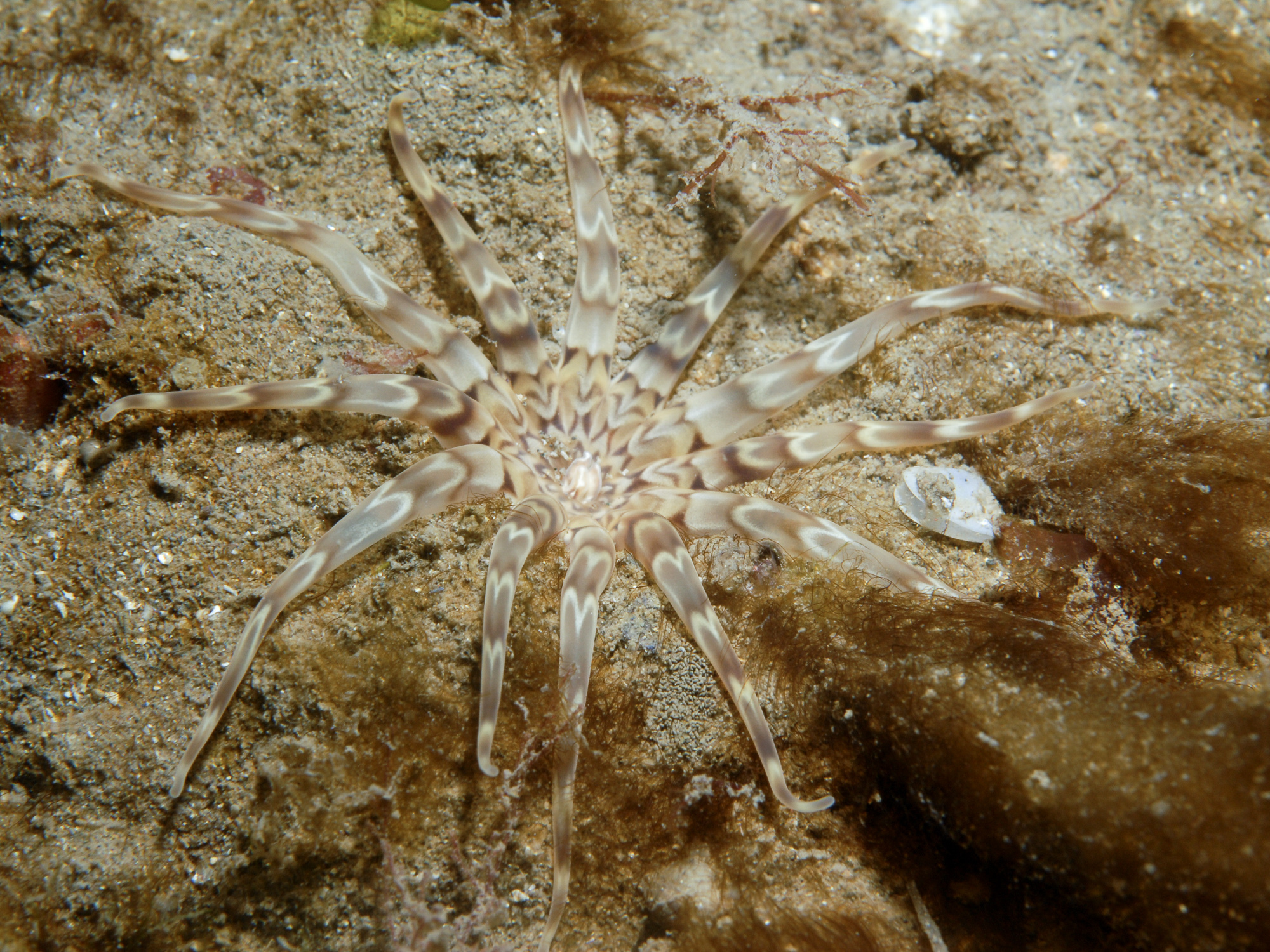

Scientific classification
- Domain: Eukaryota
- Kingdom: Animalia
- Phylum: Cnidaria
- Subphylum: Anthozoa
- Class: Hexacorallia
- Order: Actiniaria
- Family: Haloclavidae
- Genus: Peachia
- Species: P. cylindrica

Binomial name
- Peachia cylindrica (Reid, 1848)

= Peachia cylindrica =

Species of sea anemone

Peachia cylindrica is a large species of sea anemone in the family Haloclavidae. It is normally found burrowed into soft substrates, the only visible part of the animal being the oral disc and tentacles which usually lie flat on the sand. It is the type species of the genus Peachia.

== Description ==
When exposed, Peachia cylindrica can retract into a spherical shape but in its normal habitat, underwater and buried in the sand, it can extend to 30 cm (12 in) with a diameter of 2.5 cm (1 in). When extended, the lowest part of the column has a rounded base which is not adhesive to any hard structure. The main section is wider than the base part, sausage shaped, often with slight constrictions. It has a thin mucous sheath to which sand grains sometimes adhere. The short top section or capitulum is narrower and slightly fluted. The oral disc is surrounded by 12 tentacles and there is a 3-lobed conchula, a projection of the lip beside the mouth which is unique to this genus. The tentacles vary in length being short and squat when the animal is not buried but becoming long and thin when it is buried and submerged, spanning 12 cm (5 in). The colour of the column is a translucent pale brown or cream, variously speckled and streaked with brown and red markings. The bottom of the capitulum has white markings. The disc and tentacles have a chevron pattern in grey, brown and cream, though occasionally the disc is plain.

== Distribution ==
Peachia cylindrica is found around the Atlantic coasts of Western Europe, including the British Isles, and is sparsely distributed in the Mediterranean Sea. It occurs typically in the sublittoral zone buried in the sand between low water mark and a depth of 50 m (160 ft).
