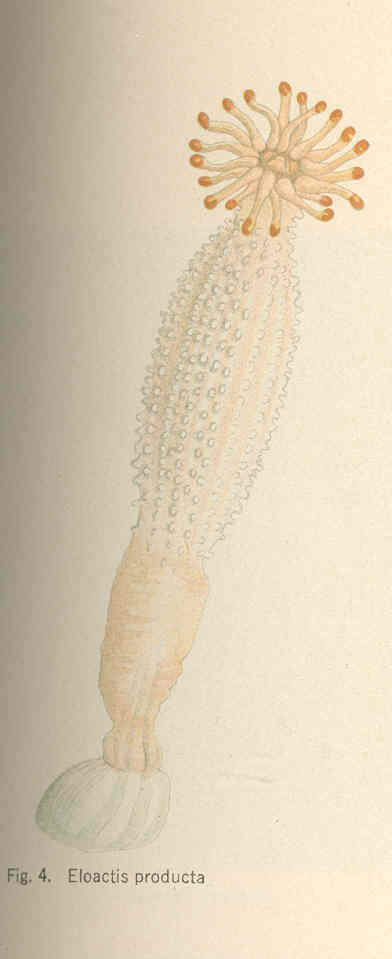

Scientific classification
- Domain: Eukaryota
- Kingdom: Animalia
- Phylum: Cnidaria
- Subphylum: Anthozoa
- Class: Hexacorallia
- Order: Actiniaria
- Family: Haloclavidae
- Genus: Haloclava
- Species: H. producta

Binomial name
- Haloclava producta (Stimpson, 1856)

Synonyms
- List: Actinia producta Stimpson, 1856; Corynactis albida Agassiz, 1859; Eloactis producta (Stimpson, 1856); Halcampa albida (Agassiz, 1859); Halcampa elizabethae A. & E. Agassiz in Andrès, 1883; Halcampa producta (Stimpson, 1856); Halocampa albida (Agassiz); Halocampa producta (Stimpson, 1856); Haloclava albida Verrill; Haloclava praducta

= Haloclava producta =

Species of sea anemone

Haloclava producta is a species of sea anemone in the family Haloclavidae, commonly known as the ghost anemone. This species is native to shallow water in the northwestern Atlantic Ocean, between Cape Hatteras and the Bay of Fundy, where it makes a temporary burrow in soft sediment. It is found on sand flats, both intertidally and subtidally.

== Description ==
H. producta has an elongated column up to 15 cm (6 in) in length and an oral disc surrounded by a whorl of about twenty short, knobbed tentacles. The column has a very thin body wall and is studded with about twenty rows of hollow blisters; it makes up most of this anemone's surface area. At the base of the column, the pedal disc is modified into a "physa", an inflatable digging organ.

== Biology ==
The water in the shallows where H. producta lives is sometimes low in oxygen. Under these conditions, the sea anemone extends its column and tentacles, perhaps to expose the largest possible area of epidermis to the water to increase oxygen uptake. It also irrigates the burrow in which it lives in the sediment, creating a current through it by a series of peristaltic waves. If exposed to hypoxia for periods of several days, its interior turns black and it gives off hydrogen sulphide. It can survive in low oxygen conditions for eleven days or more.

== Venom ==
A type of dermatitis with itchy red skin has been recognised in people who are exposed to the sand and mud flats around Long Island, New York. Although H. producta had not previously been considered to be venomous to humans, exposure to these sea anemones was thought to be responsible for the irritating rash, and this is now accepted as the cause. The condition is known as "clam diggers' itch" or "ghost anemone dermatitis", and usually affects hands and wrists, ankles, knees and inner thighs.
