= Monactis (disambiguation) =

Monactis may refer to:

- Monactis, a plant genus in the family Asteraceae
- Monactis (cnidarian), a sea anemone genus in the family Hormathiidae
