= M. africana =

M. africana may refer to:

- Malcolmia africana, the African mustard, a plant species
- Mirafra africana, the rufous-naped lark, a bird species
- Mustela africana, the Amazon weasel or Tropical Weasel, a weasel species found in the Amazon Rainforest in Brazil

== See also ==
- Africana (disambiguation)
