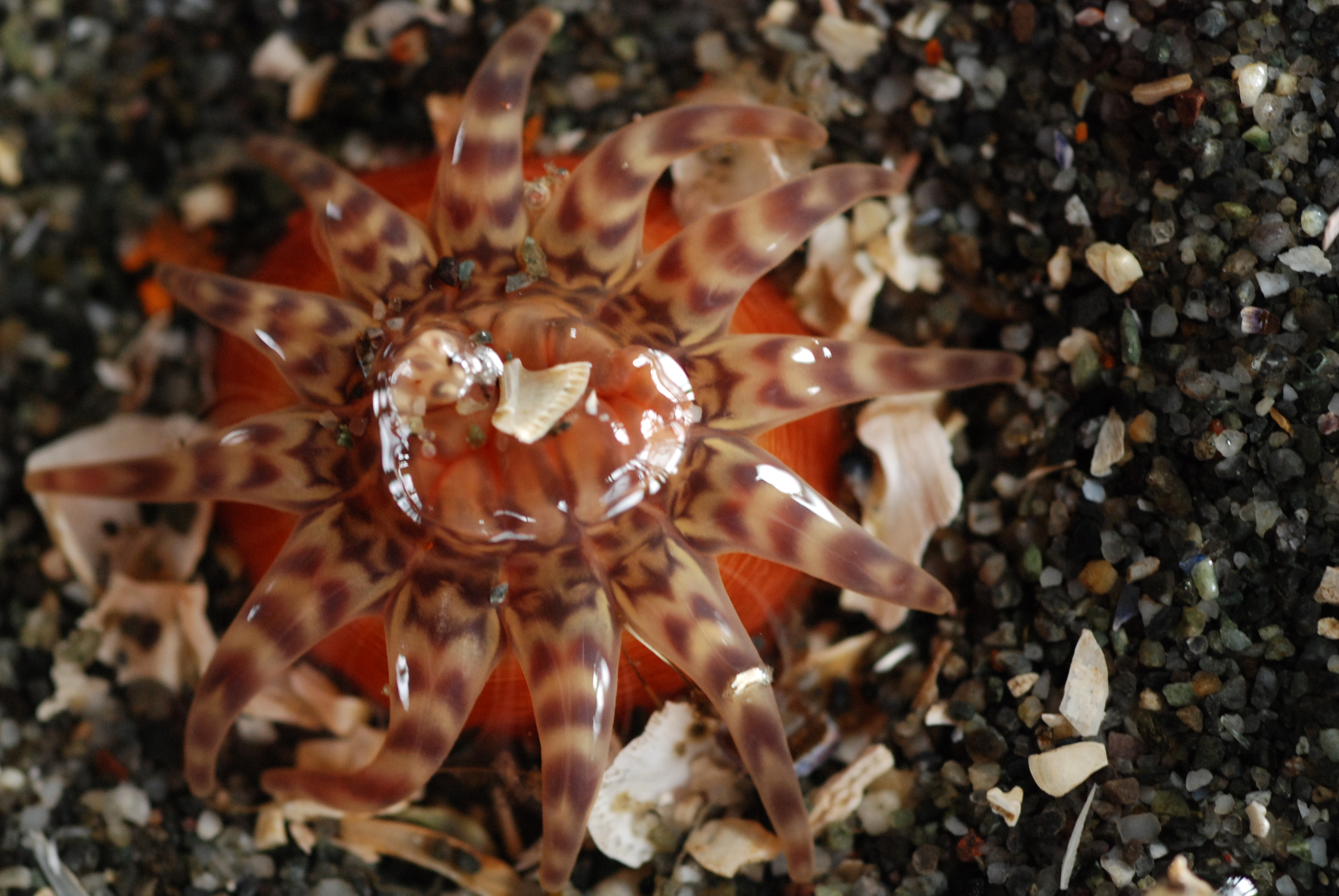
- Peachia quinquecapitata

Scientific classification
- Domain: Eukaryota
- Kingdom: Animalia
- Phylum: Cnidaria
- Subphylum: Anthozoa
- Class: Hexacorallia
- Order: Actiniaria
- Family: Haloclavidae
- Genus: Peachia; Gosse, 1855

Species
- See text

= Peachia =

Genus of sea anemones

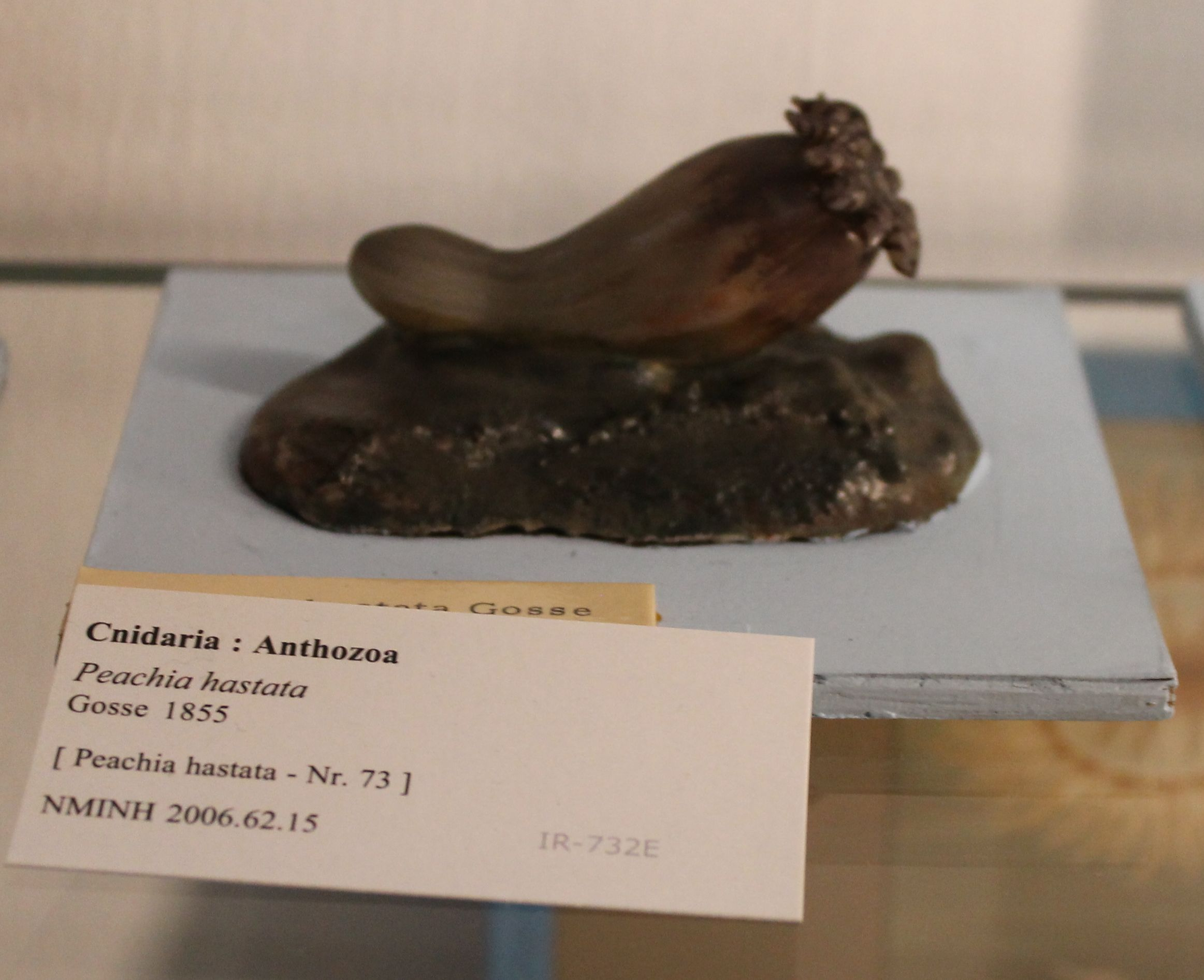
Peachia hastata, Gosse 1855, Blaschka model in National Museum of Ireland - Natural History

Peachia is a genus of sea anemone in the family Haloclavidae. Members of this genus typically burrow into soft substrates. The only part of the animal that is normally visible is the oral disc and tentacles which lie flat on the sand in a star shape. The type species is Peachia cylindrica (Reid, 1848).

== Characteristics ==
Members of the genus Peachia have a rounded base called the "physa" with tiny perforations, a tall column called the "scapus" and a delicate upper region called the "capitulum". The "siphonoglyph", a ciliated groove, is elongated and partially separated from the tubular throat, the "actinopharynx". There is a lobed projection called a "conchula", unique to this genus, at the entrance to the siphonoglyph. There are twelve, flattened tentacles. Six of the pairs of mesenteries dividing the internal body cavity are perfect while the other four are imperfect, with powerful retractor muscles. There is no sphincter muscle. The larvae are parasitic on medusae.

== Species ==
The following species are listed in the World Register of Marine Species:

- Peachia boeckii (Danielssen & Koren, 1856)
- Peachia carnea Hutton, 1879
- Peachia chilensis Carlgren, 1931
- Peachia cylindrica (Reid, 1848)
- Peachia hastata (Gosse, 1855)
- Peachia hilli Wilsmore, 1911
- Peachia koreni McMurrich, 1893
- Peachia mira Carlgren, 1943
- Peachia neozealandica Carlgren, 1924
- Peachia parasitica (Agassiz, 1859)
- Peachia quinquecapitata McMurrich, 1913
- Peachia taeniata Klunzinger, 1877
