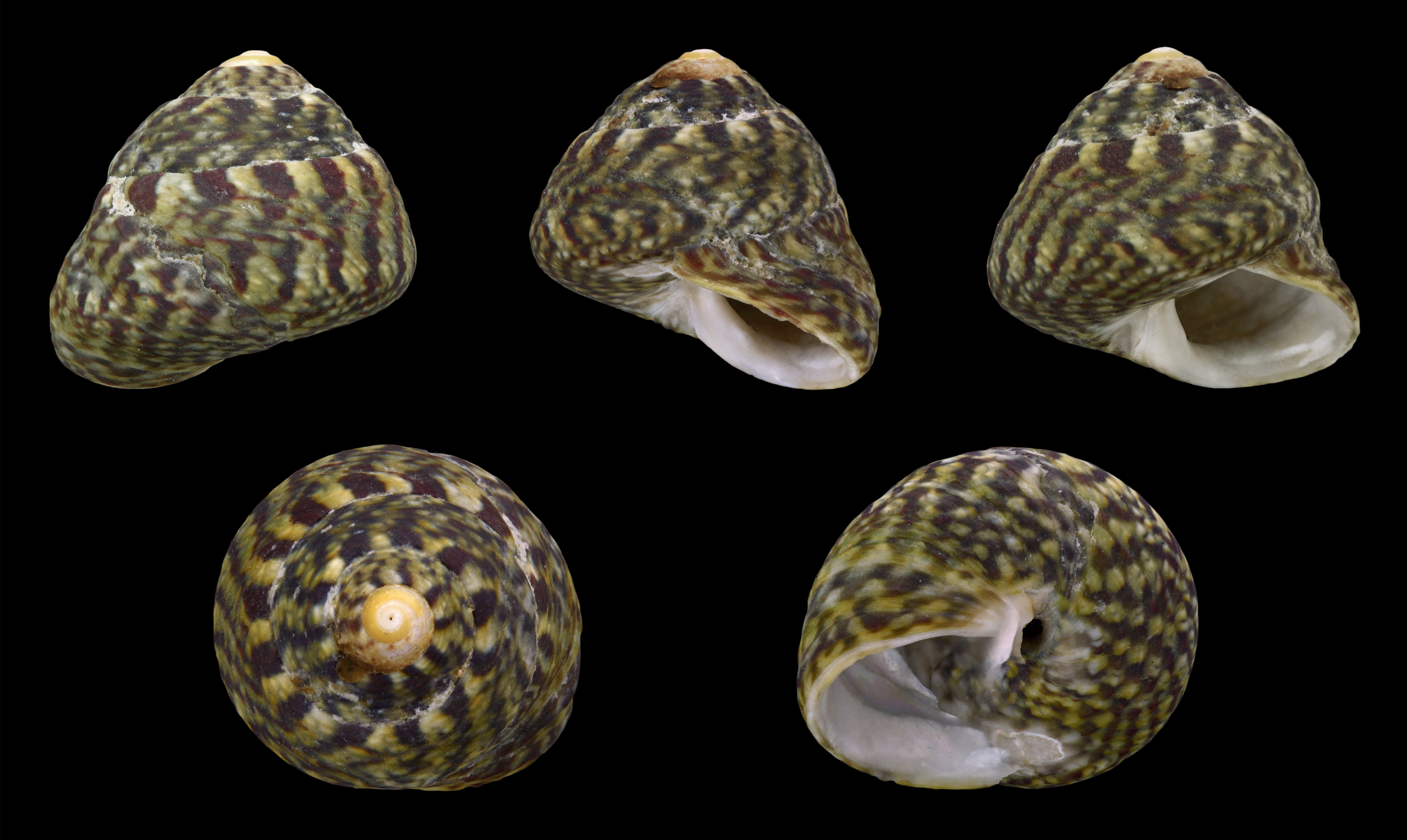
- A shell of Steromphala pennanti

Scientific classification
- Domain: Eukaryota
- Kingdom: Animalia
- Phylum: Mollusca
- Class: Gastropoda
- Subclass: Vetigastropoda
- Order: Trochida
- Superfamily: Trochoidea
- Family: Trochidae
- Subfamily: Cantharidinae
- Genus: Steromphala
- Species: S. pennanti

Binomial name
- Steromphala pennanti (Philippi, 1846)

Synonyms
- Gibbula pennanti (Philippi, 1846); Glibbulastra umbilicata Monterosato; Trochus obliquatus Gmelin 1791; Trochus obliquatus var. paupercula Monterosato 1888; Trochus pennanti Philippi, 1846 (original description); Trochus semiglobosus Aradas, 1847 (dubious synonym); Trochus umbilicalis Forbes & Hanley

= Steromphala pennanti =

Species of gastropod

Steromphala pennanti is a species of small sea snail, a marine gastropod mollusc in the family Trochidae, the top snails.

The species was named in honor of Thomas Pennant (1726 – 1798), a Welsh naturalist.

== Description ==
The size of the shell varies between 10 mm and 16 mm. The shell is more depressed than Gibbula cineraria, and (although the base is flatter) never inclined to a pyramidal form. The spiral ridges are sharper and fewer, especially in the young. The present species is usually more widely umbilicate and broader than Gibbula cineraria. The coloring is different; both have a similar kind of marking, but in the present species the longitudinal rays or streaks are red, besides being broader and not half so many as in the other species. And they are sometimes zigzag, instead of being broken into spots or interrupted by the sculpture. This species is striped, the other lineated. Just within the outer lip are two borders, one of yellow, the other of green variegated by red spots. This edging is minutely tubercled like shagreen.

== Distribution ==
This species occurs in the North Sea and off Spain.
