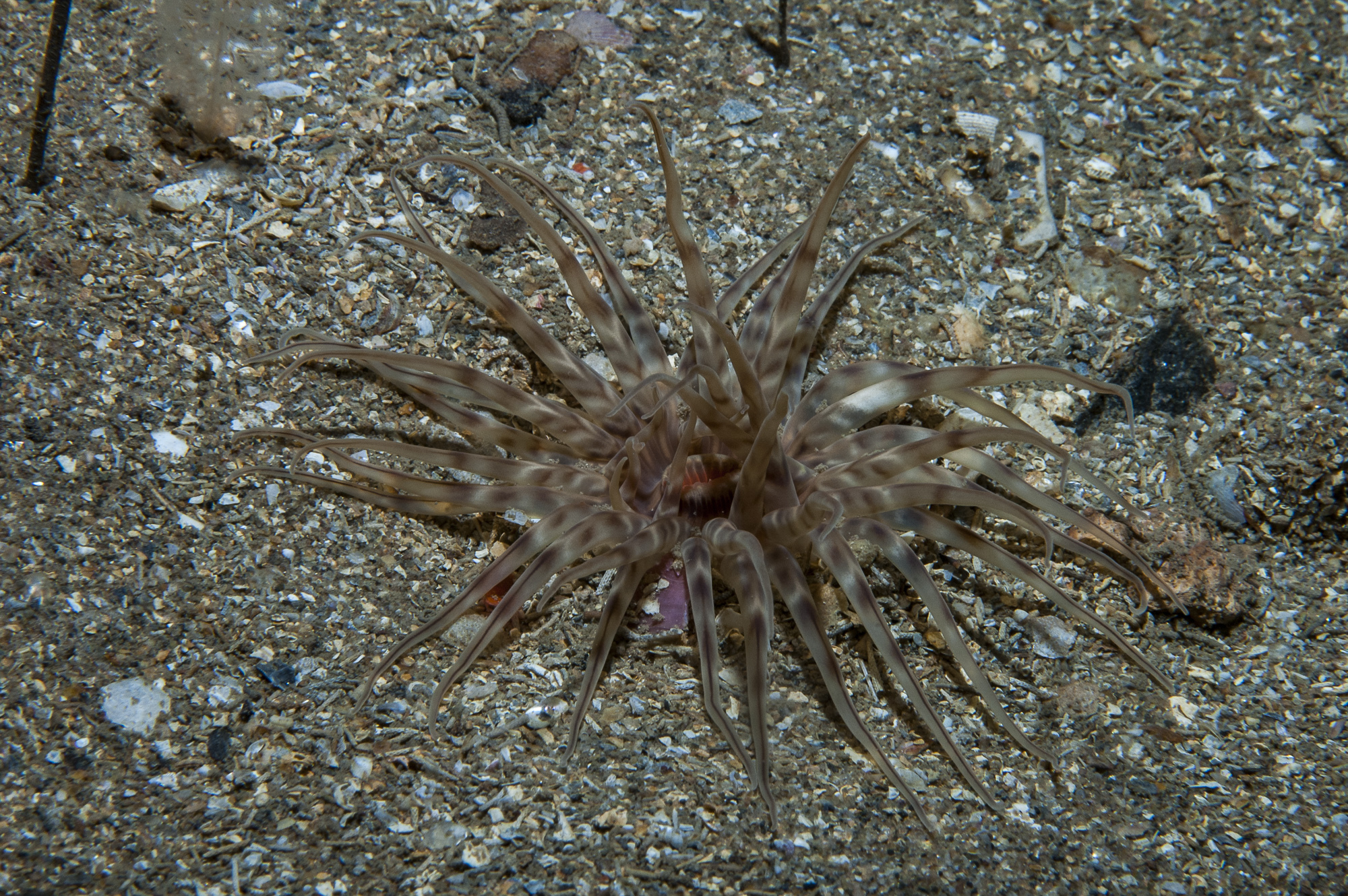

Scientific classification
- Domain: Eukaryota
- Kingdom: Animalia
- Phylum: Cnidaria
- Subphylum: Anthozoa
- Class: Hexacorallia
- Order: Actiniaria
- Family: Haloclavidae
- Genus: Mesacmaea
- Species: M. mitchellii

Binomial name
- Mesacmaea mitchellii (Gosse, 1853)

Synonyms
- Ilyanthus mitchelli; Ilyanthus mitchellii (Gosse, 1853); Ilyanthus stellatus Andres, 1881; Mesacmaea mitchelli (Gosse, 1853); Mesacmaea stellata (Andrès, 1881)

= Mesacmaea mitchellii =

Species of sea anemone

Mesacmaea mitchellii is a species of sea anemone in the family Haloclavidae. It is found in the northeastern Atlantic Ocean and the Mediterranean Sea where it burrows in soft sediment.

== Taxonomy ==
This species was first described in 1853 by the British naturalist Philip Henry Gosse as Ilyanthus mitchellii. In 1881, the Italian zoologist Angelo Andres described a new species of sea anemone, Mesacmaea stellatus, and erecting the genus Mesacmaea to accommodate it. Since then, Mesacmaea stellatus has been synonymised with Ilyanthus mitchellii, the species becoming Mesacmaea mitchellii. Two other species from the genus Ilyanthus have also been transferred to the genus Mesacmaea.

== Description ==
M. mitchellii is a robust and distinctive burrowing sea anemone. The column is pear-shaped with a rounded base, and is divided into a scapus, the main part of the column, and a scapulus, a smooth retractile region; the physa, or basal region, is able to adhere firmly to a hard surface but is not normally attached because the animal habitually burrows. The scapus often has sand grains sticking to it. The oral disc bears up to 36 tentacles in several cycles; the inner cycle contains seven tentacles which tend to be raised above the central mouth while the remaining tentacles are spread widely over the surface of the sediment. The column can be up to 50 mm (2 in) across and 70 mm (2.8 in) including the extended tentacles. The scapus is generally reddish, orange or buff, the scapulus is grey, and the oral disc and tentacles are patterned in brown, cream and red. Internally, the pharynx has a single siphonoglyph (ciliated groove) and the gastrovascular cavity is subdivided by complete mesenteries, no incomplete mesenteries being present. The retractor muscles are strong.

== Distribution and habitat ==
Mesacmaea mitchellii is native to the northeastern Atlantic Ocean where it occurs in the sublittoral zone around the coasts of Britain and Western Europe and in the Mediterranean Sea. Its depth range is between 15 and 100 m (50 and 330 ft) and its habitat is soft sediment such as sand and gravel. The base of the column is used for burrowing, and the animal feeds with only the top of the column, oral disc and tentacles above the sediment.
