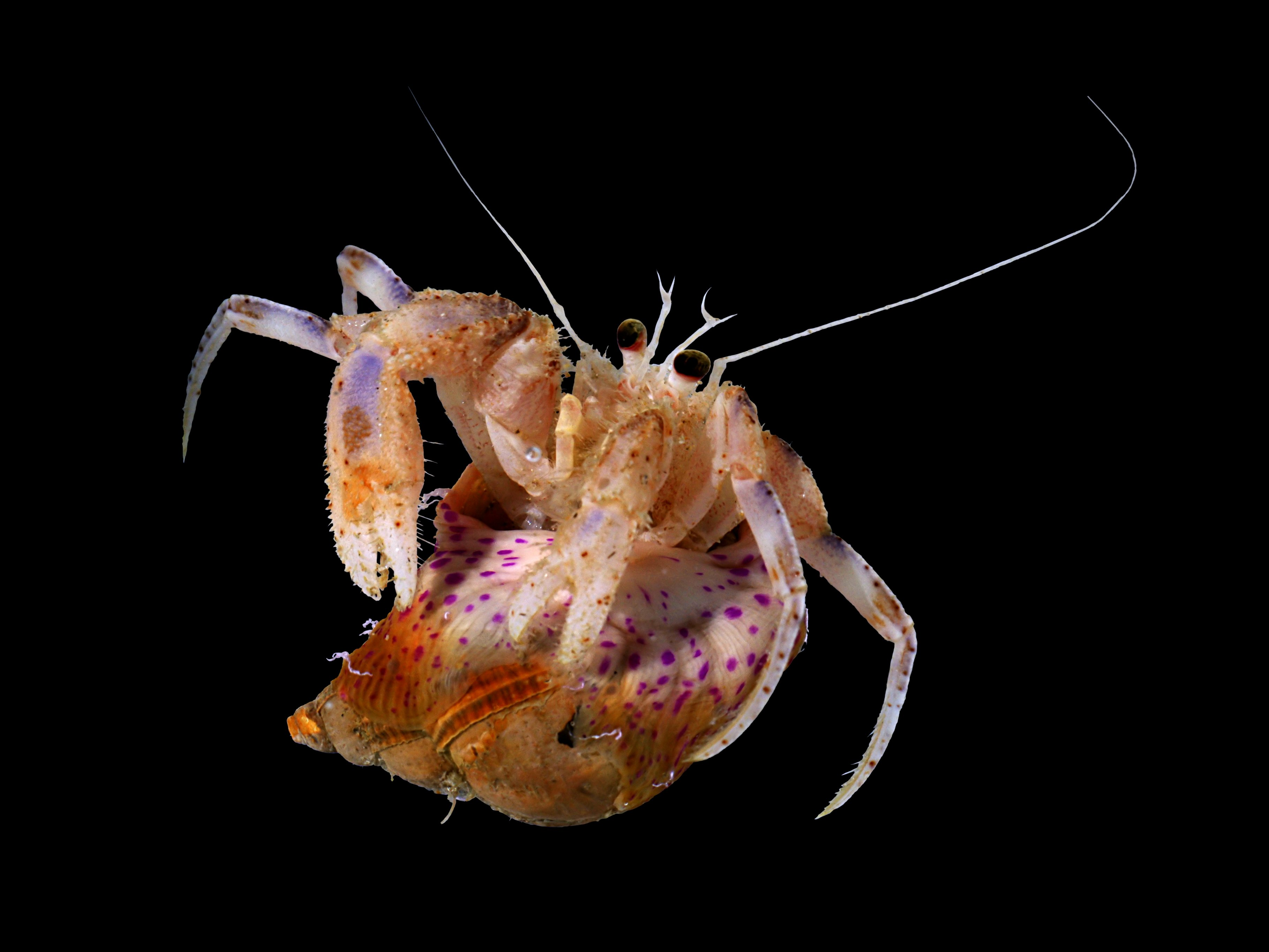
- Pagurus prideaux in a shell of Buccinum undatum

Scientific classification
- Kingdom: Animalia
- Phylum: Arthropoda
- Clade: Pancrustacea
- Class: Malacostraca
- Order: Decapoda
- Suborder: Pleocyemata
- Infraorder: Anomura
- Family: Paguridae
- Genus: Pagurus
- Species: P. prideaux

Binomial name
- Pagurus prideaux Leach, 1815

Synonyms
- P. prideauxi Leach, 1815; P. solitarius Risso, 1827

= Pagurus prideaux =

Species of crustacean

Pagurus prideaux is a species of hermit crab in the family Paguridae. It is found in shallow waters off the northwest coast of Europe and usually lives symbiotically with the sea anemone Adamsia palliata.

== Description ==
Like other hermit crabs, P. prideaux has an asymmetric, unarmoured abdomen and protects this by concealing it within the empty shell of a gastropod of appropriate size and shape, and carrying it around by clasping onto an internal part of the columella of the sea snail shell. The carapace of the crab is brownish-red with paler patches and rather wider than it is long. It has several tufts of short bristles and can reach a length of 14 mm (0.6 in). The right cheliped can block the entrance to the shell. It is armed with a pincer and is larger than the left one.

== Distribution and habitat ==
P. prideaux is found on sand, gravel and mud between the tide marks and in the shallow sublittoral. It particularly favours muddy areas with shell fragments and gravel. It occurs in the Mediterranean Sea, the North Sea and the northeast Atlantic Ocean from Cape Verde north to Norway.

== Ecology ==
P. prideaux is nearly always found in association with the sea anemone, Adamsia palliata (the "cloak anemone"). The anemone grows on the underside of the shell inhabited by the hermit crab. Its base enlarges and two flaps wrap around the shell until eventually they meet at the top. Its base secretes a chitinous membrane that extends the gastropod shell, enlarging its capacity, and allowing the hermit crab to occupy it for a longer period. The relationship between the two is symbiotic. The crab is less likely to be attacked by predators because of the anemone's nematocysts and the anemone in turn benefits from the food fragments thrown up by the crab's activities.

Another animal with which P. prideaux has a symbiotic relationship is the polychaete worm Iphitime paguri. Adult worms and the larval stages are frequently found in the apex of the gastropod shell. Intermediate sized worms are found in the gill chambers and in a groove under the carapace.
