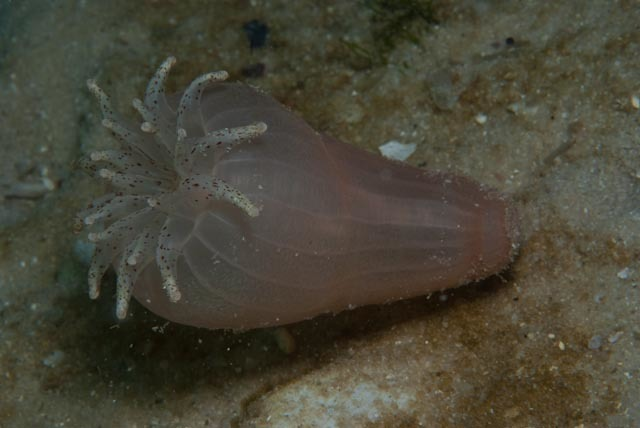
- Haloclava capensis

Scientific classification
- Domain: Eukaryota
- Kingdom: Animalia
- Phylum: Cnidaria
- Subphylum: Anthozoa
- Class: Hexacorallia
- Order: Actiniaria
- Family: Haloclavidae
- Genus: Haloclava; Verrill, 1899

Species
- See text

= Haloclava =

Genus of sea anemones

Haloclava is a genus of sea anemones in the family Haloclavidae. Members of this genus typically burrow into soft sediment.

== Species ==
The following species are listed by the World Register of Marine Species:

- Haloclava brevicornis (Stimpson, 1856)
- Haloclava capensis (Verrill, 1865)
- Haloclava chinensis Carlgren, 1931
- Haloclava producta (Stimpson, 1856)
- Haloclava stimpsoni (Verrill, 1868)
