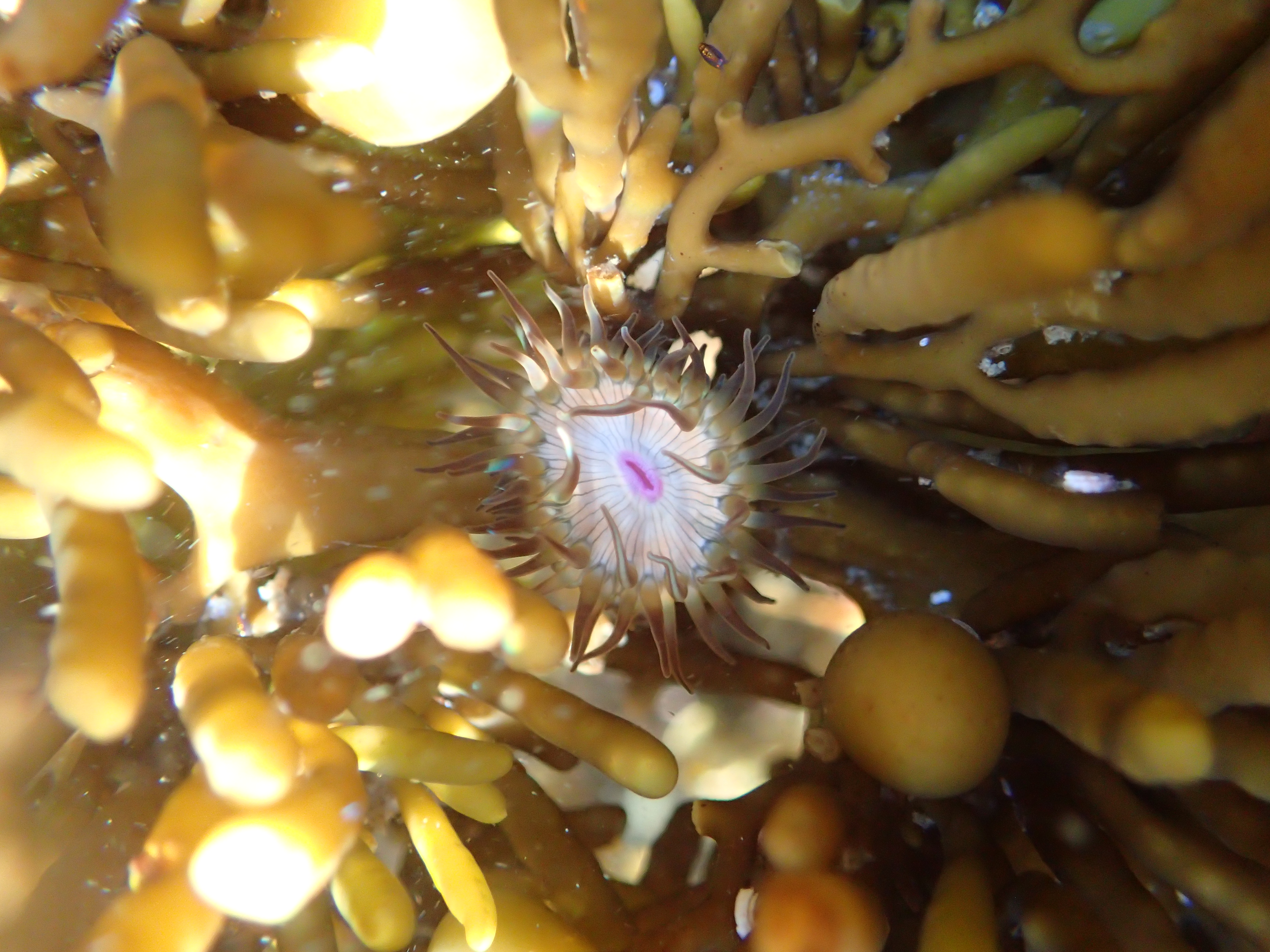

Scientific classification
- Kingdom: Animalia
- Phylum: Cnidaria
- Subphylum: Anthozoa
- Class: Hexacorallia
- Order: Actiniaria
- Family: Hormathiidae
- Genus: Handactis; Fautin, 2016
- Species: H. nutrix

Binomial name
- Handactis nutrix (Stuckey, 1909)

Synonyms
- Genus: Cricophorus Carlgren, 1924; Species: Cricophorus nutrix (Stuckey, 1909); Sagartia nutrix Stuckey, 1909

= Handactis =

Species of sea anemone

Handactis nutrix, commonly known as the brooding or nurse anemone, is a species of sea anemone endemic to New Zealand. It is the only species in the genus Handactis.

It is found living in colonies on the stem of large seaweed and kelp species in the low tidal zone. It can also live in deep tidal pools where seaweed is present.

== Description ==
This small anemone has a diameter of 10–15 millimetres with a range of colours that can appear to be iridescent.

When underwater it extends short, fine, smooth tentacles that are 2–5 millimetres long with rounded tips. These are arranged in three to four crowded whorls along the edge of the disc. The inner tentacles can be twice as long as the outer tentacles. Tentacle colour can range between light yellow and deep brown and often feature green, blue or red tinges. Its central disc can be a similar colour to the tentacles or a contrasting colour such as white, purple or orange and usually features radial markings. Its mouth can be light blue, bright pink or purple, and often has a lighter colour on the interior. The anemone's column is usually a deep brown colour, but can also be green, blue, or yellow.

Out of water, the tentacles retract and the anemone camouflages itself against the plant it is attached to.

== Behaviour ==
Brooding anemone release long, white threads of stinging cells when it is disturbed. This is a defence mechanism to deter attackers.
