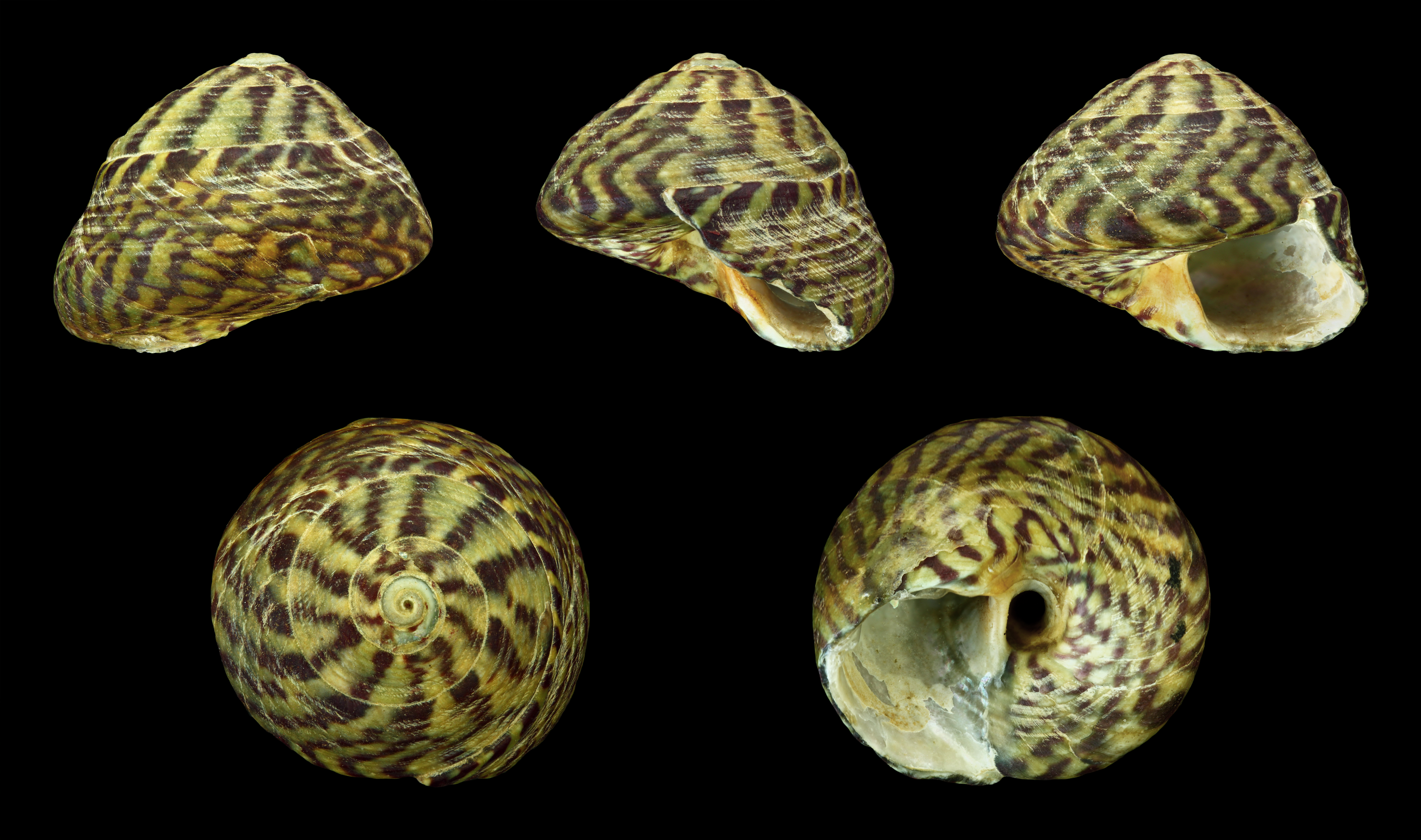
- A shell of Steromphala umbilicalis

Scientific classification
- Kingdom: Animalia
- Phylum: Mollusca
- Class: Gastropoda
- Subclass: Vetigastropoda
- Order: Trochida
- Family: Trochidae
- Subfamily: Cantharidinae
- Genus: Steromphala
- Species: S. umbilicalis

Binomial name
- Steromphala umbilicalis (da Costa, 1778)

Synonyms
- Gibbula obliquata (Gmelin, 1791); Gibbula obliquata var. gradata Pallary, 1920; Gibbula umbilicalis (da Costa, 1778); Trochus cinereus Blainville, 1826 non Linnaeus, 1758; Trochus obliquatus Gmelin, 1791; Gibbula obliquata (Gmelin, 1791); Trochus sarniensis Norman, 1888; Trochus umbilicalis da Costa, 1778 (original combination); Trochus umbilicatus Montagu, 1803; Trochus umbilicatus var. atropurpurea Jeffreys, 1865; Trochus umbilicatus var. decorata Jeffreys, 1865

= Steromphala umbilicalis =

Species of gastropod

Steromphala umbilicalis, common name the flat top shell, is a species of sea snail, a marine gastropod mollusk in the family Trochidae, the top snails.

== Description ==
The size of an adult shell varies between 10 mm and 22 mm. The shell is more depressed than Gibbula cineraria, and (although the base is flatter) never inclined to a pyramidal form. The spiral ridges are sharper and fewer, especially in the young. The coloring is different; both have a similar kind of marking, but in the present species the longitudinal rays or streaks are red, besides being broader and not half so many as in the other species. They are sometimes zigzag, instead of being broken into spots or interrupted by the sculpture. This species is striped, the other lineated. Just within the outer lip are two borders, one of yellow, the other of green variegated by red spots. This edging is minutely tubercled like shagreen.

== Distribution ==
This marine species occurs in European waters and in the Mediterranean Sea off Morocco. It is found from the upper shore into the sublittoral on sheltered rocky shores and is tolerant of emersion and brackish waters.
