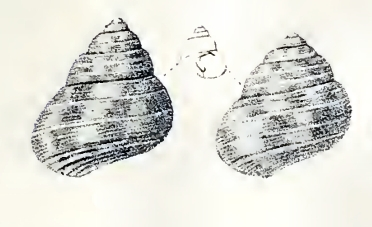
- Drawing with two views of a shell of Steromphala spratti

Scientific classification
- Kingdom: Animalia
- Phylum: Mollusca
- Class: Gastropoda
- Subclass: Vetigastropoda
- Order: Trochida
- Family: Trochidae
- Subfamily: Cantharidinae
- Genus: Steromphala
- Species: S. spratti

Binomial name
- Steromphala spratti (Forbes, 1844)

Synonyms
- Gibbula spratti (Forbes, 1844) (superseded generic combination); Gibbula spratti ghisottii F. Nordsieck, 1982; Trochus alveolatus Philippi, 1846 (dubious synonym); Trochus pictus Philippi, 1846 (dubious synonym, preoccupied by Trochus pictus Wood, 1828); Trochus spratti Forbes, 1844

= Steromphala spratti =

Species of gastropod

Steromphala spratti is a species of sea snail, a marine gastropod mollusk in the family Trochidae, the top snails.

== Description ==
The size of the shell varies between 5 mm and 8 mm. The somewhat thick, narrowly perforate shell has a conoid shape. It is whitish, radiately tlammulate with deep brown subquadrate maculations. The shell is very finely obliquely striate, and concentrically lirate. Each whorl is encircled by two more prominent, remote sulci. The shell contains 6 convex whorls, separated by deep sutures, and inflated above. The body whorl is subangulate, convex beneath, and contains numerous unequal concentric lirae. The aperture is rhomboidal. The slightly convex columella is sinuous in the middle.

== Distribution ==
This species occurs in the Aegean Sea.
