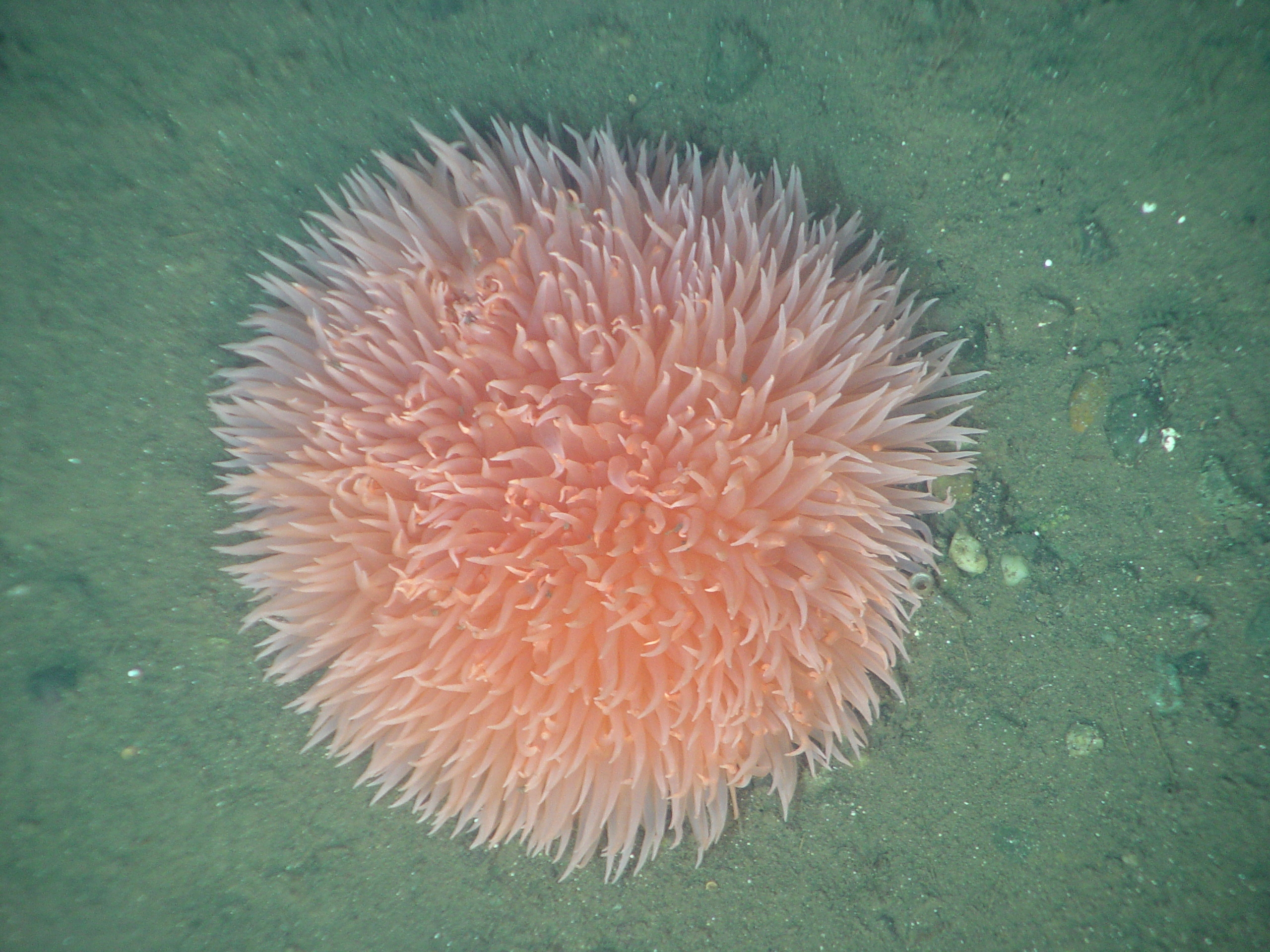
- Liponema brevicorne

Scientific classification
- Domain: Eukaryota
- Kingdom: Animalia
- Phylum: Cnidaria
- Class: Hexacorallia
- Order: Actiniaria
- Family: Liponematidae
- Genus: Liponema
- Species: L. brevicorne

Binomial name
- Liponema brevicorne (McMurrich, 1893)

Synonyms
- Bolocera brevicornis McMurrich, 1893; Lipomena brevicornis; Liponema brevicornis (McMurrich, 1893)

= Liponema brevicorne =

Species of sea anemone

Liponema brevicorne, commonly known as pom-pom anemone or tentacle shedding anemone, is a species of sea anemone in the family Actiniidae. It is a deep water species and has been relatively little observed. It often remains unattached to a substrate and can roll across the ocean floor propelled by water currents.

== Description ==
L. brevicorne can grow up to 30 centimetres (1 ft) in diameter. It can adopt various shapes ranging from globose and inflated to low and flattened. It has a well-developed base and a short, smooth column. The wide oral disc overhangs the column and is covered with a very large number of short tentacles arranged in whorls. There is a sphincter muscle at the base of each tentacle which can be contracted in order to jettison the tentacle.

== Distribution and habitat ==
L. brevicorne is found in deep water in the north east Pacific Ocean. The depth range is said to be 100 to 1000 metres (330 to 3,300 ft) but it has been found at much greater depths. Large numbers were observed at the site of a whale carcase that had sunk to the sea floor at 3000 metres (10,000 ft). These anemones are typically found unattached on muddy, sandy and gravelly sediments but also occur near deep water hydrothermal vents and cold seeps.

== Biology ==
L. brevicorne is a predator and scavenger. It uses its tentacles to capture plankton, small crustaceans, krill and other organic food particles floating past.

== Ecology ==
Unusually for a sea anemone, L. brevicorne usually remains unattached to any solid substrate. Sometimes it rolls itself up and allows itself to drift with the current and roll across the seabed like tumbleweed before coming to rest against any solid object it encounters. In a study of a whale carcase that had fallen to the seafloor in Monterey Canyon, it was found that many specimens of L. brevicorne accumulated alongside. Associated with these were a large number of sea spiders in the class Pycnogonida. More than one of these was observed standing over an anemone with its proboscis inserted into the sea anemone's tentacle to suck out its body fluids. The anemone was not killed by this but afterwards had a somewhat deflated appearance. Other pycnogonids were observed to carry tentacles away, presumably to be consumed elsewhere.
