= Paraphellia =

Scientific classification
- Kingdom: Animalia
- Phylum: Cnidaria
- Subphylum: Anthozoa
- Class: Hexacorallia
- Order: Actiniaria
- Family: Hormathiidae
- Genus: Paraphellia; Haddon, 1889

Genus of sea anemones

Paraphellia is a genus of cnidarians belonging to the family Hormathiidae.

The species of this genus are found in Western Europe, Northern Africa, Malesia.

Species:

- Paraphellia expansa Haddon, 1886
- Paraphellia hunti Haddon & Shackleton, 1893
- Paraphellia lineata Haddon & Shackleton, 1893
- Paraphellia sanzoi Calabresi, 1926
