= Steromphala chattica =

Scientific classification
- Kingdom: Animalia
- Phylum: Mollusca
- Class: Gastropoda
- Subclass: Vetigastropoda
- Order: Trochida
- Family: Trochidae
- Genus: Steromphala
- Species: †S. chattica

Binomial name
- †Steromphala chattica (Janssen, 1978)

Synonyms
- Jujubinus chatticus; Jujubinus (Strigosella) chatticus

Species of gastropod

Steromphala chattica is a species of extinct sea snail, a marine gastropod mollusc in the family Trochidae, which are the top snails.
