= Strigosella (gastropod) =

Scientific classification
- Domain: Eukaryota
- Kingdom: Animalia
- Phylum: Mollusca
- Class: Gastropoda
- Subclass: Vetigastropoda
- Order: Trochida
- Superfamily: Trochoidea
- Family: Trochidae
- Genus: Strigosella

Type species
- Trochus strigosus Gmelin, 1791

Synonyms
- Calliostoma (Strigosella) Sacco, 1896 (original rank)

Genus of molluscs

Strigosella is a genus of mollusks belonging to the family Trochidae.

Strigosella is a junior objective synonym of Scrobiculinus Monterosato, 1889, a synonym of Steromphala Gray, 1847

The species of this genus are found in Australia and Europe.

Species:

- Strigosella lepida (Philippi, 1846): synonym of Cantharidus lepidus (Philippi, 1849)
