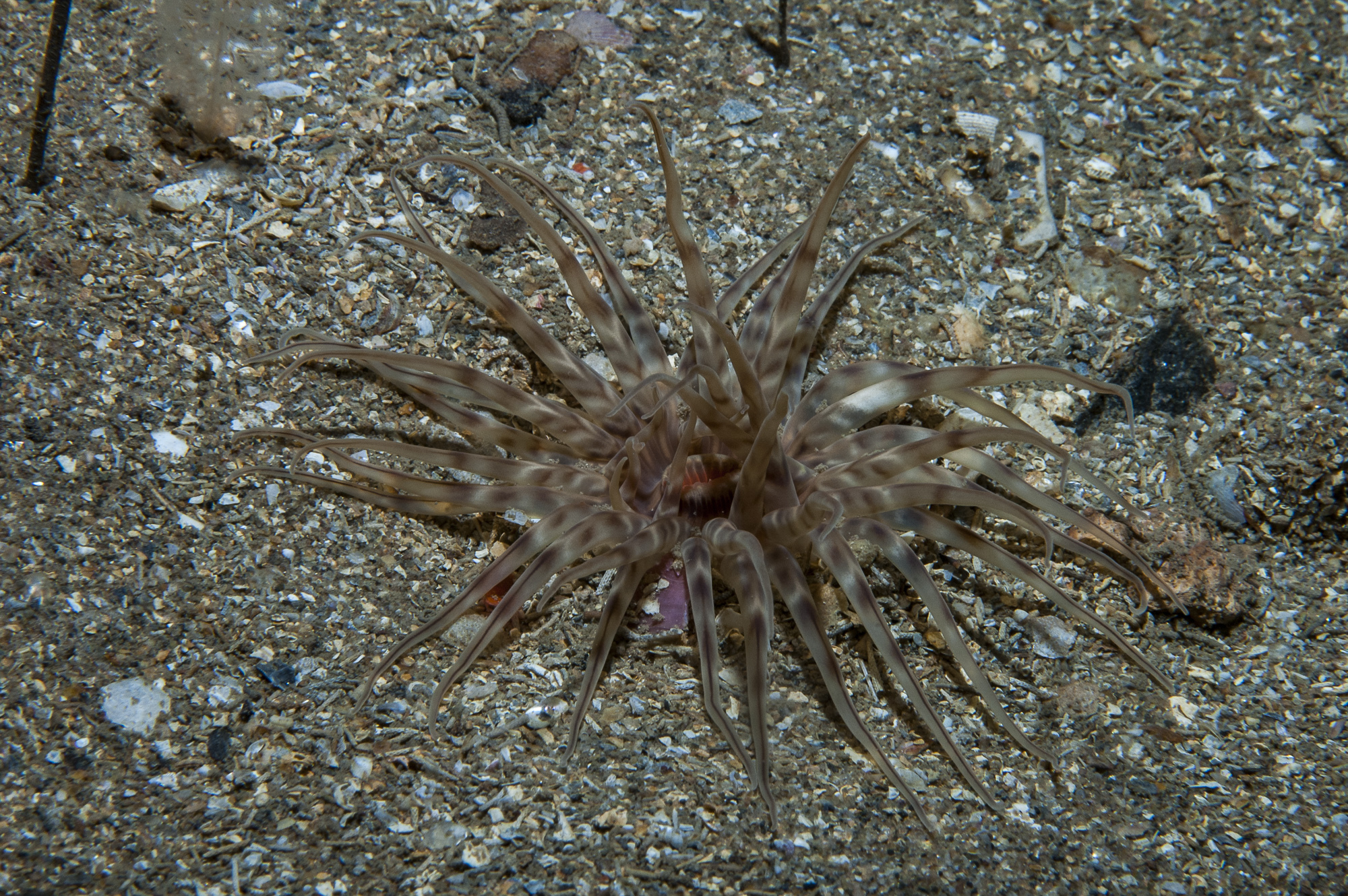
- Mesacmaea mitchelli

Scientific classification
- Domain: Eukaryota
- Kingdom: Animalia
- Phylum: Cnidaria
- Subphylum: Anthozoa
- Class: Hexacorallia
- Order: Actiniaria
- Family: Haloclavidae
- Genus: Mesacmaea; Andres, 1883

Species
- See text

= Mesacmaea =

Genus of sea anemones

Mesacmaea is a genus of sea anemone in the family Haloclavidae. Members of this genus typically burrow into soft substrates. The only part of the animal that is normally visible is the oral disc and tentacles which lie flat on the sand in a star shape.

== Species ==
The following species are listed by the World Register of Marine Species:

- Mesacmaea chloropsis (Agassiz in Verrill, 1864)
- Mesacmaea laevis (Verrill, 1864)
- Mesacmaea mitchellii (Gosse, 1853)
