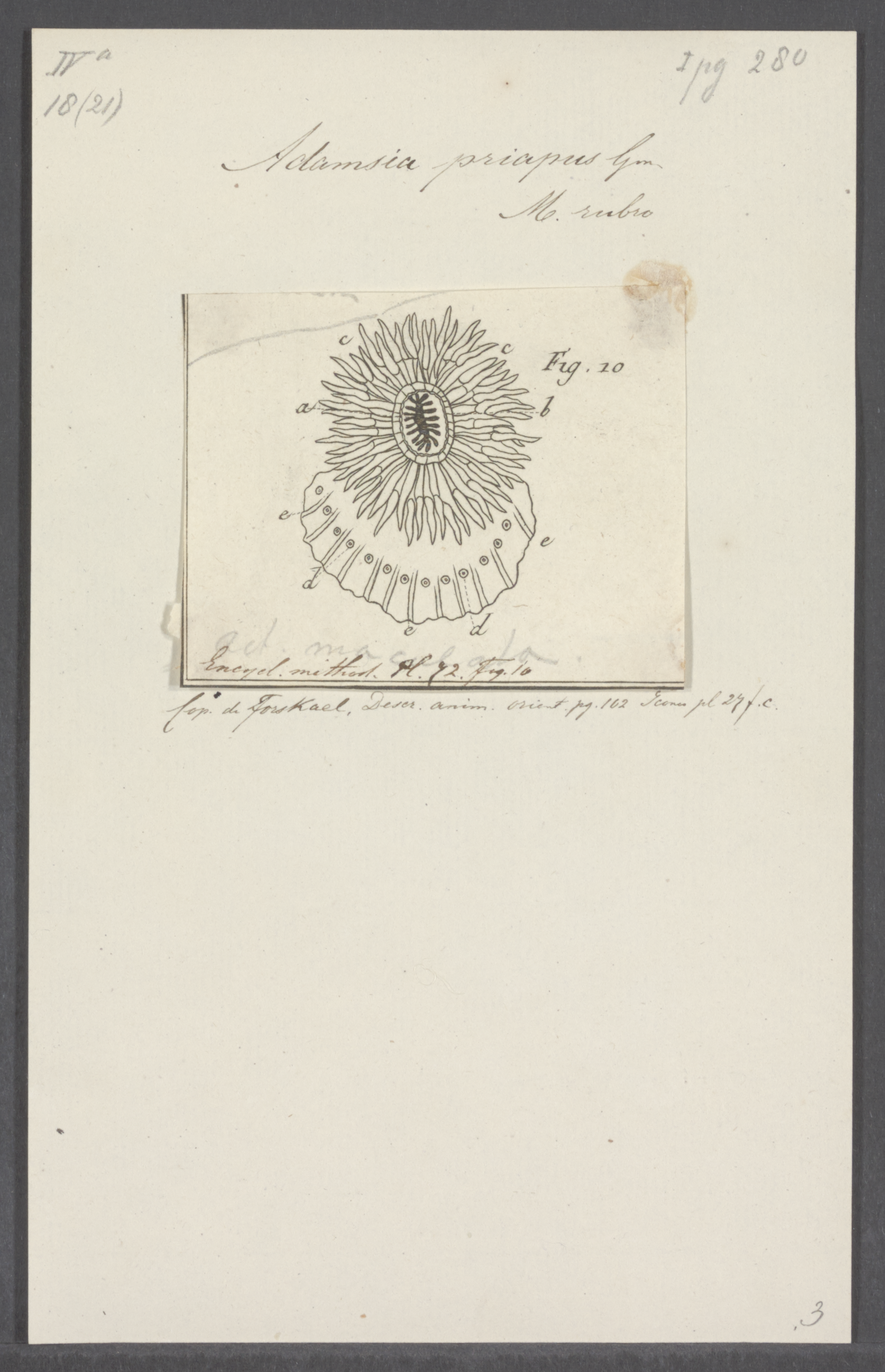

Scientific classification
- Kingdom: Animalia
- Phylum: Cnidaria
- Subphylum: Anthozoa
- Class: Hexacorallia
- Order: Actiniaria
- Family: Hormathiidae
- Genus: Adamsia; Forbes, 1840

Species
- See text

= Adamsia =

Genus of sea anemones

Adamsia is a genus of sea anemones in the family Hormathiidae. Species in this genus are mutually symbiotic with hermit crabs. The anemone gets a place to live and discarded scraps of the crab's food in exchange for its help in the crab's defence. As these anemones grow, they secrete a horny membrane, known as a carcinoecium, which overlies the crab's original snail shell and expands the living space of the crab. This means the anemone does not have to change substrate and the crab does not have to seek a larger shell as they both grow.

== Species ==
Species within the genus include:

- Adamsia fusca (Quoy & Gaimard, 1833)
- Adamsia involvens McMurrich, 1893
- Adamsia obvolva Daly et al., 2004
- Adamsia palliata (Fabricius, 1779)
- Adamsia rondeletti (Delle Chiaje, 1822)
- Adamsia sociabilis Verrill, 1882
