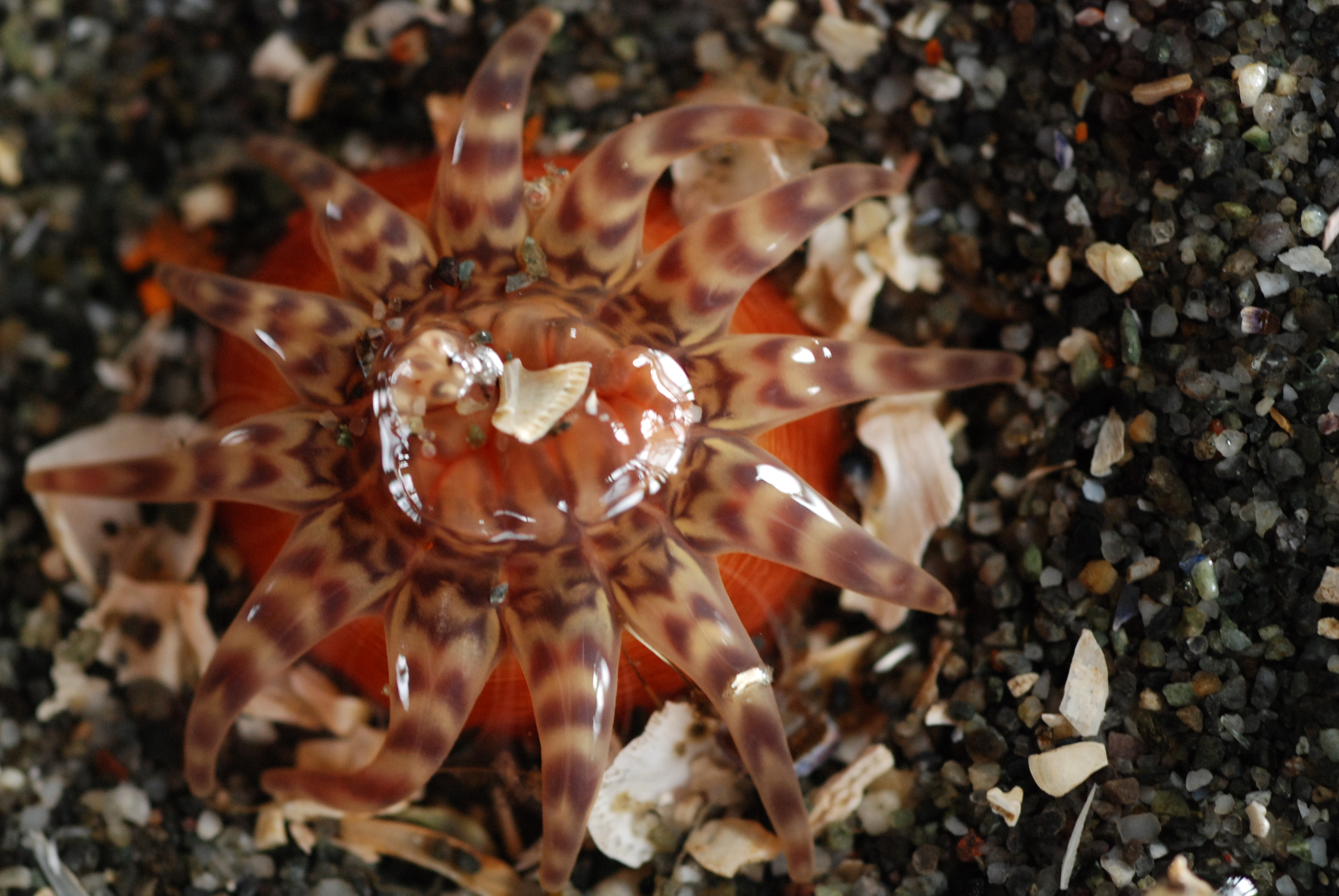

Scientific classification
- Domain: Eukaryota
- Kingdom: Animalia
- Phylum: Cnidaria
- Subphylum: Anthozoa
- Class: Hexacorallia
- Order: Actiniaria
- Family: Haloclavidae
- Genus: Peachia
- Species: P. quinquecapitata

Binomial name
- Peachia quinquecapitata McMurrich, 1913

= Peachia quinquecapitata =

Species of sea anemone

Peachia quinquecapitata, also known as the twelve-tentacled parasitic anemone, is a species of sea anemone in the family Haloclavidae. It is found in the Pacific Northwest of North America. The larva is parasitic on certain species of Anthomedusae.

== Description ==
Peachia quinquecapitata lives with its elongated column buried in the sand and its twelve tentacles fanned out on the surface. The oral disc is red and the translucent tentacles are banded with buff and brown in a chevron pattern. Like other members of the genus Peachia, it has a "conchula", an enlargement on the lip by its mouth, which in this species is divided into five lobes.

== Distribution ==
Peachia quinquecapitata is found in shallow seas in the Pacific Northwest of the United States including Puget Sound.

== Life cycle ==
The life cycle of Peachia quinquecapitata was investigated in the laboratory. Spawning was induced by manipulating light levels. The eggs had a diameter of 120 μm and, after fertilisation, developed into planula larvae. Some of the larvae were ingested by the medusa, Phialidium gregarium (now classified as Clytia gregaria), and only they continued to develop in the laboratory setting. At first they fed on food particles in the gastrovascular cavity of the jellyfish but after 11 days they developed parasitic habits and began to feed on their hosts' gonads, moving on later to other tissues. One anemone larva was able to consume a gonad completely in two days. Thirty-one days after becoming parasitic they had developed into juvenile sea anemones with an adult body plan. At this stage they detached themselves from their hosts and dropped to the sea floor where they started to live independently. This parasitism is likely to be harmful to the host but of advantage to the anemone in that its larvae can develop safely in a protective environment and passively disperse to new localities. The prevalence of infection in the jellyfish Clytia gregaria at Friday Harbor, Washington peaks in the spring at 62%.
