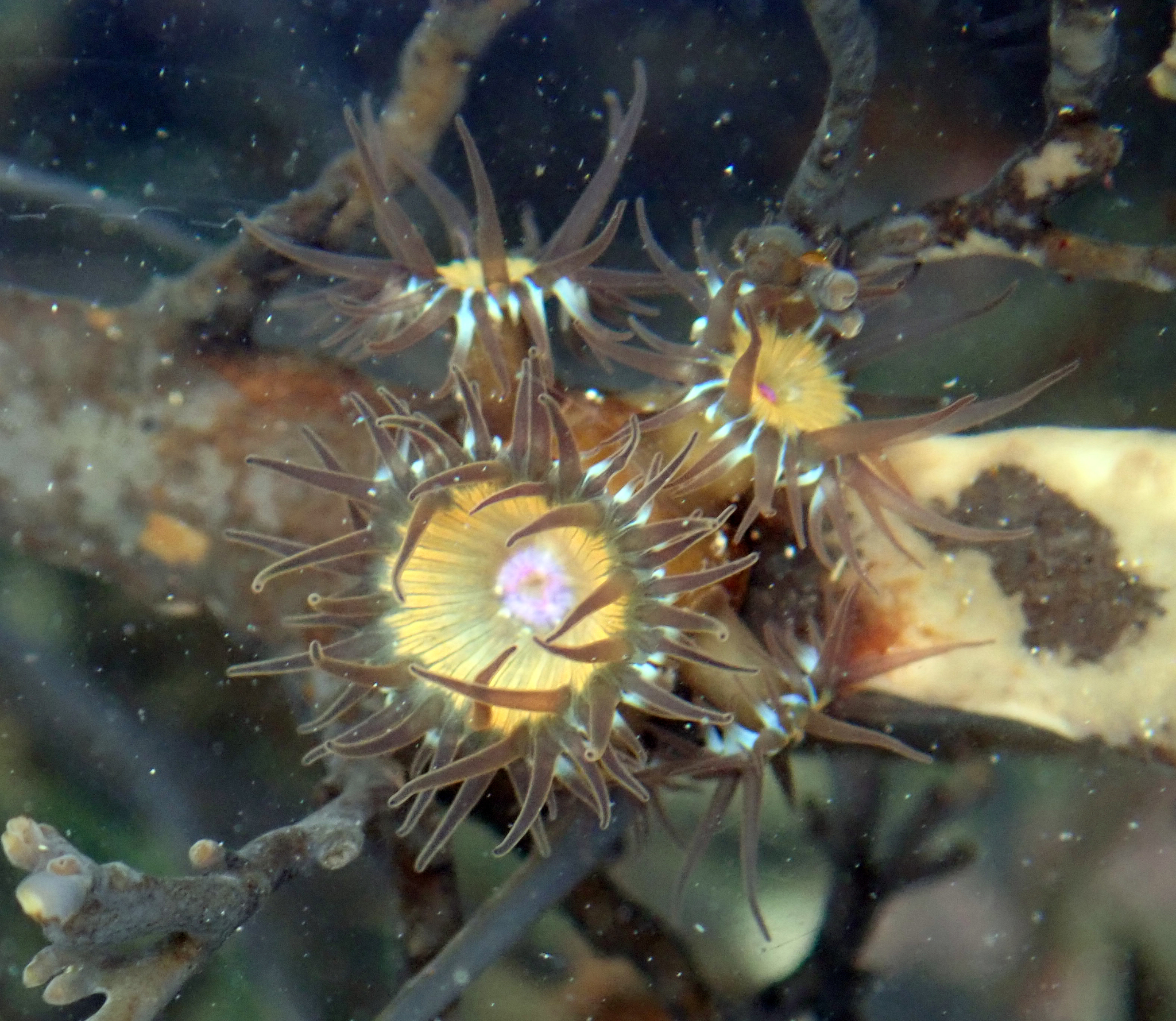
- Handactis nutrix

Scientific classification
- Kingdom: Animalia
- Phylum: Cnidaria
- Subphylum: Anthozoa
- Class: Hexacorallia
- Order: Actiniaria
- Superfamily: Metridioidea
- Family: Hormathiidae; Carlgren, 1932

= Hormathiidae =

Family of sea anemones

Hormathiidae is a family of sea anemones in the class Anthozoa.

== Genera ==
Genera in this family include:

- Actinauge Verrill, 1883
- Adamsia Forbes, 1840
- Allantactis Danielssen, 1890
- Calliactis Verrill, 1869
- Cataphellia Stephenson, 1929
- Chitonanthus
- Chondranthus Migot & Portmann, 1926
- Chondrophellia Carlgren, 1925
- Gliactis
- Handactis Fautin, 2016
- Hormathia Gosse, 1859
- Hormathianthus Carlgren, 1943
- Leptoteichus Stephenson, 1918
- Monactis Riemann-Zurneck, 1986
- Paracalliactis Carlgren, 1928
- Paraphellia Haddon, 1889
- Paraphelliactis Carlgren, 1928
- Parastephanauge Dufaure, 1959
- Phelliactis Simon, 1892
