= Monactis vestita =

Scientific classification
- Kingdom: Animalia
- Phylum: Cnidaria
- Subphylum: Anthozoa
- Class: Hexacorallia
- Order: Actiniaria
- Family: Hormathiidae
- Genus: Monactis; Riemann-Zürneck, 1986
- Species: M. vestita

Binomial name
- Monactis vestita (Gravier, 1918)

Genus of sea anemones

Monactis is a genus of sea anemones in the family Hormathiidae. There is only a single species known in this genus, Monactis vestita; it is found in the north-eastern Atlantic Ocean.
