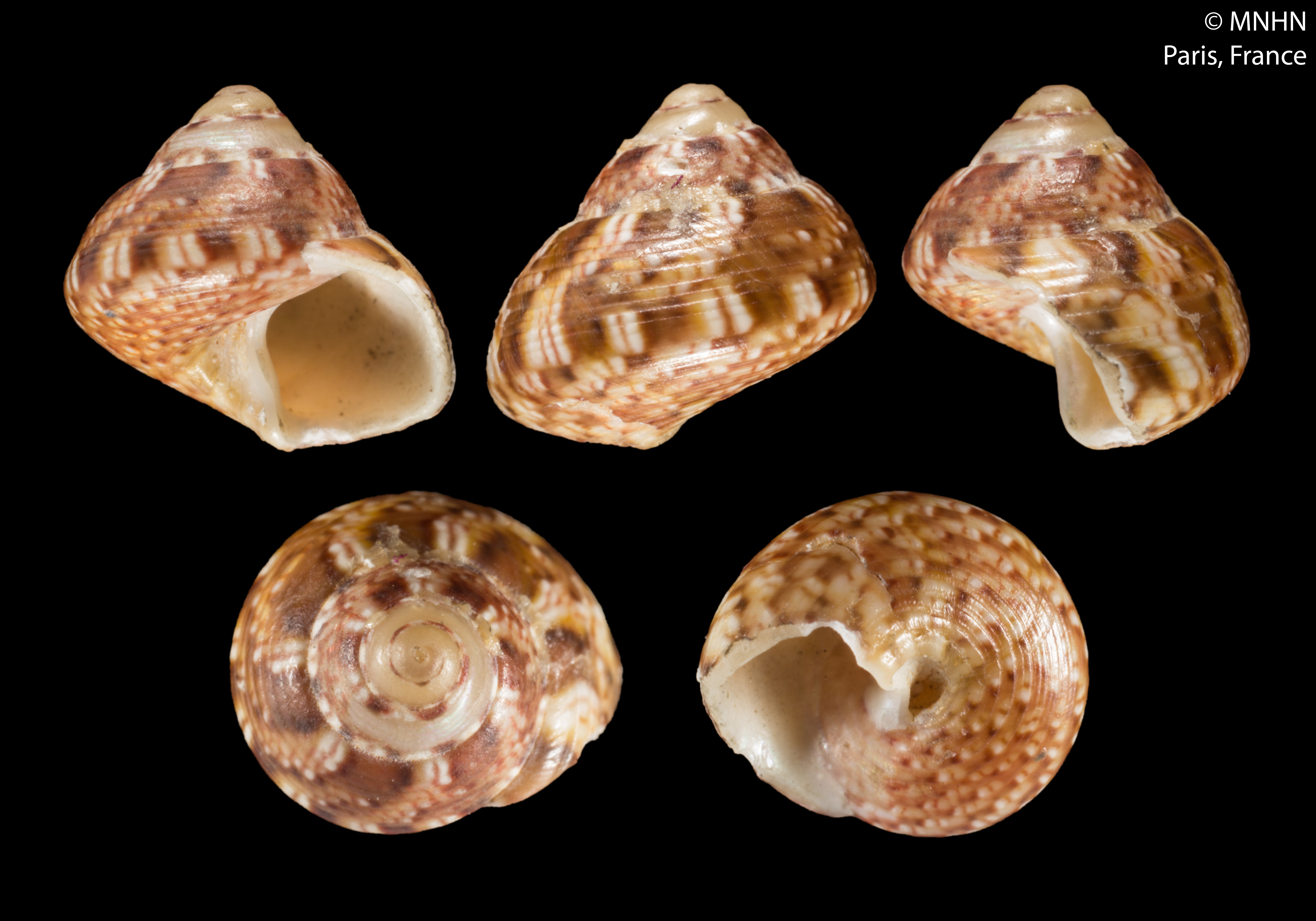
- Shell of Steromphala adansonii (syntype at MNHN, Paris)

Scientific classification
- Kingdom: Animalia
- Phylum: Mollusca
- Class: Gastropoda
- Subclass: Vetigastropoda
- Order: Trochida
- Family: Trochidae
- Subfamily: Cantharidinae
- Genus: Steromphala
- Species: S. adansonii

Binomial name
- Steromphala adansonii (Payraudeau, 1826)

Synonyms
- Gibbula (Magulus) ardens var. acutispira Bellini, 1903; Gibbula (Phorculus) cyrenaica Monterosato, 1923; Gibbula adansonii (Payraudeau, 1826); Gibbula adansonii adansonii (Payraudeau, 1826); Gibbula adansonii sulliotti Monterosato, 1888; Gibbula adansonii var. aegyptiaca Pallary 1912; Gibbula adansonii var. dissimilis Monterosato 1888; Gibbula adansonii var. flammulata Monterosato 1888; Gibbula adansonii var. lucida Monterosato 1888; Gibbula adansonii var. minorlevigata Monterosato 1888; Gibbula adansonii var. striata Monterosato 1888; Gibbula conemenosi Monterosato 1888; Gibbula ivanicsi Brusina, 1865; Gibbula sulliottii Monterosato 1888; Gibbula virescens Nordsieck 1972; Trochus adansonii Payraudeau, 1828 (original combination); Trochus adansonii var. major Bucquoy, Dautzenberg & Dollfus 1884; Trochus adriaticus Philippi; Trochus agathensis Récluz, 1843; Trochus angulatus (Eichwald) Brusina; Trochus euxinicus Andr., Kryn., 1837; Trochus helidoides Philippi; Trochus ivanicsiana Brusina, 1866; Trochus olivaceus Anton; Trochus pumilio Philippi; Trochus turbinoides Deshayes; Trochus varians Deshayes; Trochus variegatus Risso, 1826

= Steromphala adansonii =

Species of gastropod

Steromphala adansonii is a species of sea snail, a marine gastropod mollusk in the family Trochidae, the top snails.

== Description ==
The height of the shell attains 12 mm, its diameter 10½ mm.

The narrowly umbilicate shell has a conical shape. Its color is maroon or deep brown, with longitudinal undulating flames of white, continuous or interrupted into spots on the base. The elevated spire is conoidal and contains 6 to 7convex whorls, traversed by numerous spiral striae. The large body whorl is dilated and subangulate at the periphery. The base of the shell is convex, concentrically finely lirate, each ridge divided by a central impressed line. The sutures are deeply impressed. The aperture is subquadrangular. The columella is straight or a little projecting in the middle. The deep umbilicus is very narrow, bounded by a carina.

== Distribution ==
This species occurs in the Mediterranean Sea, the Adriatic Sea and the Black Sea.
