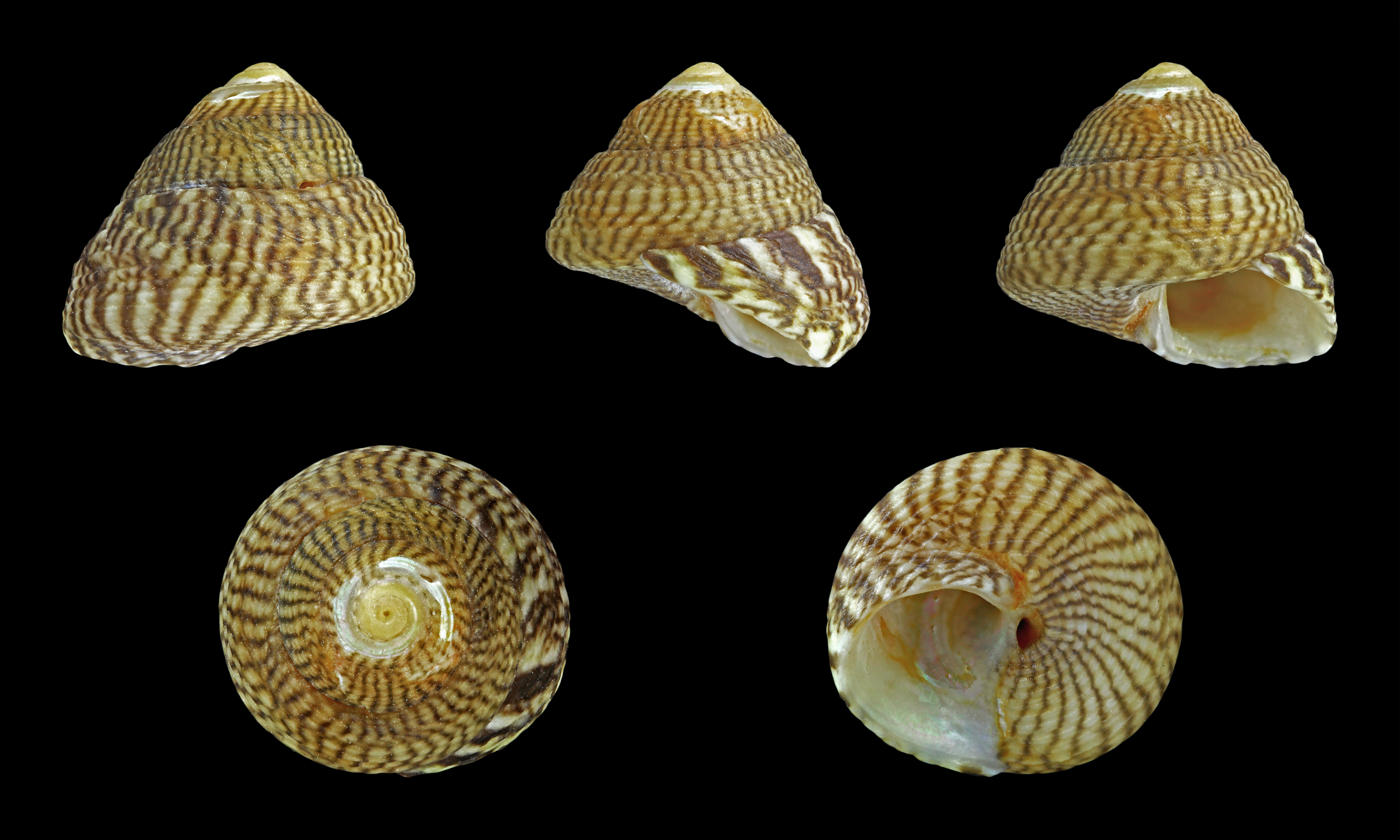
- Shell of Steromphala cineraria

Scientific classification
- Kingdom: Animalia
- Phylum: Mollusca
- Class: Gastropoda
- Subclass: Vetigastropoda
- Order: Trochida
- Superfamily: Trochoidea
- Family: Trochidae
- Subfamily: Cantharidinae
- Genus: Steromphala; Gray, 1847

Type species
- Trochus cinerarius Linnaeus, 1758

Synonyms
- Calliostoma (Strigosella) Sacco, 1896 (original rank); Colliculus Monterosato, 1888; Gibbula (Colliculus) Monterosato, 1888 (original rank); Gibbula (Steromphala) Gray, 1847 (original rank); Gibbula (Steromphalus) P. Fischer, 1885 (unjustified emendation of Steromphala); Gibbulastra Monterosato, 1884; Korenia Friele, 1877; Scrobiculinus Monterosato, 1889; Strigosella Sacco, 1896 (junior objective synonym of Scrobiculinus)

= Steromphala =

Genus of gastropods

Steromphala is a genus of sea snails, marine gastropod mollusks in the subfamily Cantharidinae of the family Trochidae, the top snails.

== Species ==
Species within the genus Steromphala include:

- Steromphala adansonii (Payraudeau, 1826)
- Steromphala adriatica (Philippi, 1844)
- Steromphala albida (Gmelin, 1791)
- † Steromphala biangulata (Eichwald, 1830)
- † Steromphala brevispira (Harmer, 1923)
- † Steromphala brocchii (Mayer in Cocconi, 1873)
- † Steromphala chattica (Janssen, 1978)
- Steromphala cineraria (Linnaeus, 1758)
- † Steromphala cineroides (Wood, 1842)
- † Steromphala dertosulcata (Sacco, 1896)
- † Steromphala distefanoi (Crema, 1903)
- Steromphala divaricata (Linnaeus, 1758)
- † Steromphala insignis (Millet, 1854)
- Steromphala leucophaea (Philippi, 1836)
- † Steromphala milleti (Ceulemans, Van Dingenen & Landau, 2016)
- † Steromphala monodontoides (Millet, 1854)
- Steromphala nebulosa (Philippi, 1849)
- Steromphala nivosa (A. Adams, 1853)
- † Steromphala olympica (Garilli, Crisci & Messina, 2005)
- Steromphala pennanti (Philippi, 1846)
- † Steromphala perconica (Sacco, 1896)
- † Steromphala pliocenica (Greco, 1970)
- † Steromphala provosti (Ceulemans, Van Dingenen & Landau, 2016)
- Steromphala racketti (Payraudeau, 1826)
- Steromphala rarilineata (Michaud, 1829)
- † Steromphala simulans (De Stefani & Pantanelli, 1878)
- Steromphala spratti (Forbes, 1844)
- † Steromphala subcineraria (d'Orbigny, 1852)
- † Steromphala taurolaevis (Sacco, 1896)
- † Steromphala terrerossae (Spadini, 1986)
- Steromphala tumida (Montagu, 1803)
- Steromphala umbilicalis (da Costa, 1778)
- Steromphala umbilicaris (Linnaeus, 1758)
- Steromphala varia (Linnaeus, 1758)
- † Steromphala verae (Chirli, 2004)

Species brought into synonymy

- Steromphala crimeana Anistratenko & Starobogatov, 1991: synonym of Steromphala rarilineata (Michaud, 1829)
