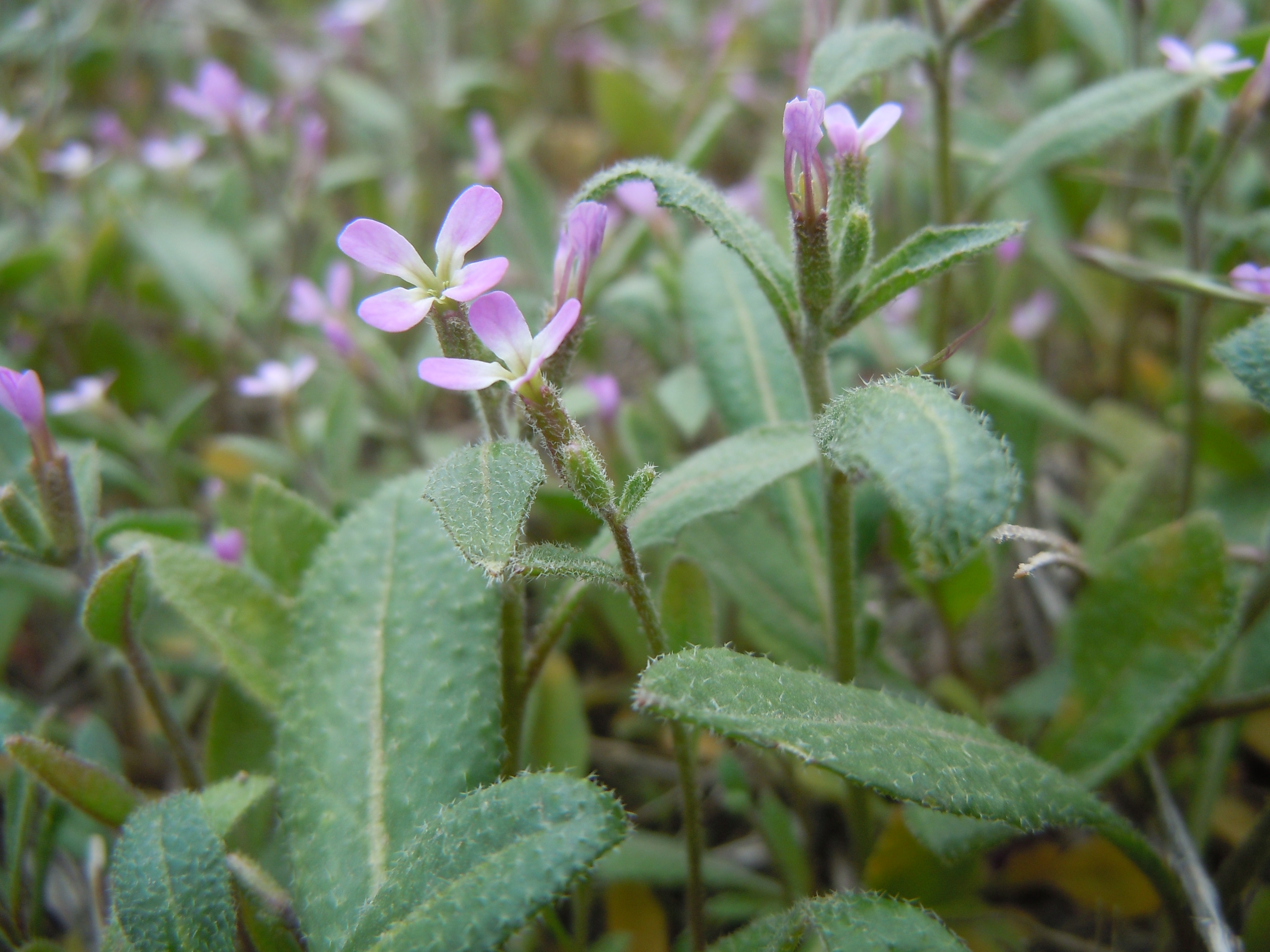
- Strigosella africana

Scientific classification
- Kingdom: Plantae
- Clade: Tracheophytes
- Clade: Angiosperms
- Clade: Eudicots
- Clade: Rosids
- Order: Brassicales
- Family: Brassicaceae
- Genus: Strigosella; Boiss.

Synonyms
- Fedtschenkoa Regel

= Strigosella (plant) =

Genus of flowering plants

Strigosella is a genus of flowering plants belonging to the family Brassicaceae.

Its native range is Mediterranean to China and Arabian Peninsula.

As of June 2024, Plants of the World Online accepted the following species:

- Strigosella africana (L.) Botsch.
- Strigosella behboudiana (Rech.f. & Esfand.) Botsch.
- Strigosella brevipes (Bunge) Botsch.
- Strigosella cabulica Boiss.
- Strigosella circinata (Bunge) Botsch.
- Strigosella grandiflora (Bunge) Botsch.
- Strigosella hispida (Litv.) Botsch.
- Strigosella hyrcanica (Freyn & Sint.) Botsch.
- Strigosella intermedia (C.A.Mey.) Botsch.
- Strigosella latifolia Bondarenko & Botsch.
- Strigosella leptopoda Bondarenko & Botsch.
- Strigosella longipetala (Gilli) Botsch.
- Strigosella malacotricha (Botsch. & Vved.) Botsch.
- Strigosella myrzakulovii Bajtenov
- Strigosella scorpioides (Bunge) Botsch.
- Strigosella spryginioides (Botsch. & Vved.) Botsch.
- Strigosella stenopetala (Fisch. & C.A.Mey.) Botsch.
- Strigosella strigosa (Boiss.) Botsch.
- Strigosella tadzhikistanica (Vassilcz.) Botsch.
- Strigosella tenuissima (Botsch.) Botsch.
- Strigosella toppinii (O.E.Schulz) Botsch.
- Strigosella trichocarpa (Boiss. & Buhse) Botsch.
- Strigosella turkestanica (Litv.) Botsch.
- Strigosella vvedenskyi Bondarenko & Botsch.
