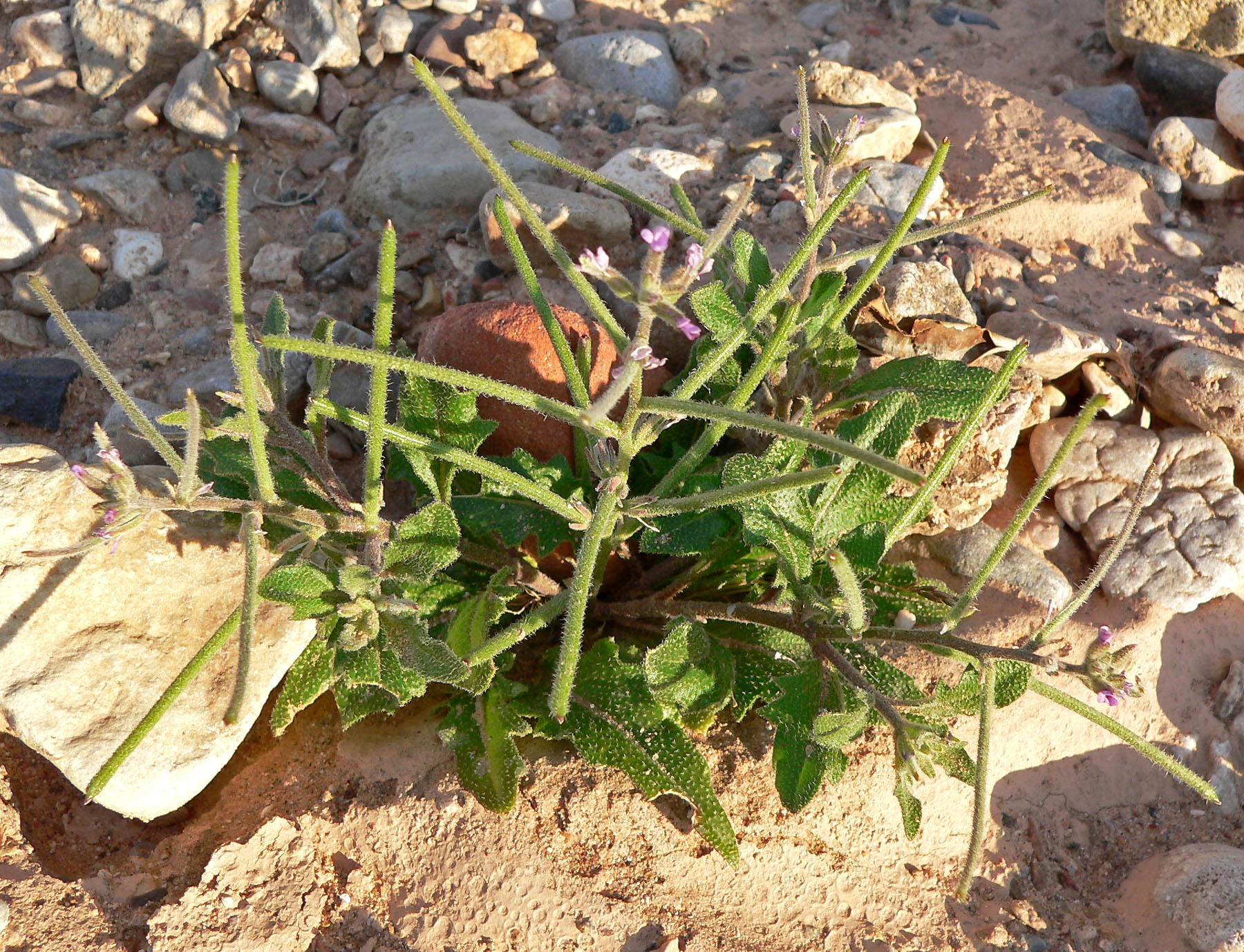
- Individual near Lake Mead, southern Nevada

Scientific classification
- Kingdom: Plantae
- Clade: Tracheophytes
- Clade: Angiosperms
- Clade: Eudicots
- Clade: Rosids
- Order: Brassicales
- Family: Brassicaceae
- Genus: Strigosella
- Species: S. africana

Binomial name
- Strigosella africana (L.) Botsch.

Synonyms
- Synonymy: Cheiranthus scaber Moench; Cheiranthus taraxacifolius Balb.; Crucifera africana (L.) E.H.L.Krause; Erysimum polyceratum Pall.; Fedtschenkoa africana (L.) F.Dvořák; Hesperis africana L. (1753) (basionym); Hesperis diffusa Lam.; Hesperis hispida Schreb. ex Roth; Hesperis inodora Asso; Hesperis jasa Fisch., C.A.Mey. & Avé-Lall.; Hesperis laxa Lam.; Hesperis pachypodium E.Fourn.; Malcolmia africana (L.) W.T.Aiton; Malcolmia africana var. calycina Sennen ex Maire; Malcolmia africana var. laxa (DC.) Regel; Malcolmia africana var. squarrosa Sennen & Mauricio; Malcolmia calycina Sennen; Malcolmia divaricata Fisch.; Malcolmia halophila Gilli; Malcolmia laxa DC.; Malcolmia laxa var. hispidula Regel; Malcolmia laxa var. stenopetala Regel; Strigosella africana var. laxa (Lam.) Botsch.; Strigosella laxa (Lam.) Galushko; Wilckia africana (L.) F.Muell.; Wilckia africana var. laxa (Lam.) Grossh.

= Strigosella africana =

Species of flowering plant

Strigosella africana, or African mustard, is a species of flowering plant in the family Brassicaceae. It is an annual plant which ranges from the Mediterranean Basin through western and Central Asia, the Caucasus, Ukraine, southern and Eastern European Russia, and Mongolia to India and China. It has naturalized elsewhere, including much of western North America and parts of France, Central Europe, and Argentina. It is invasive in Nevada and Utah.

It is an annual herb growing in a prostrate patch or clump with stiff, furry stems up to half a meter long. The mustardlike flowers are pink to lavender and yield siliques up to 6 centimeters long.
