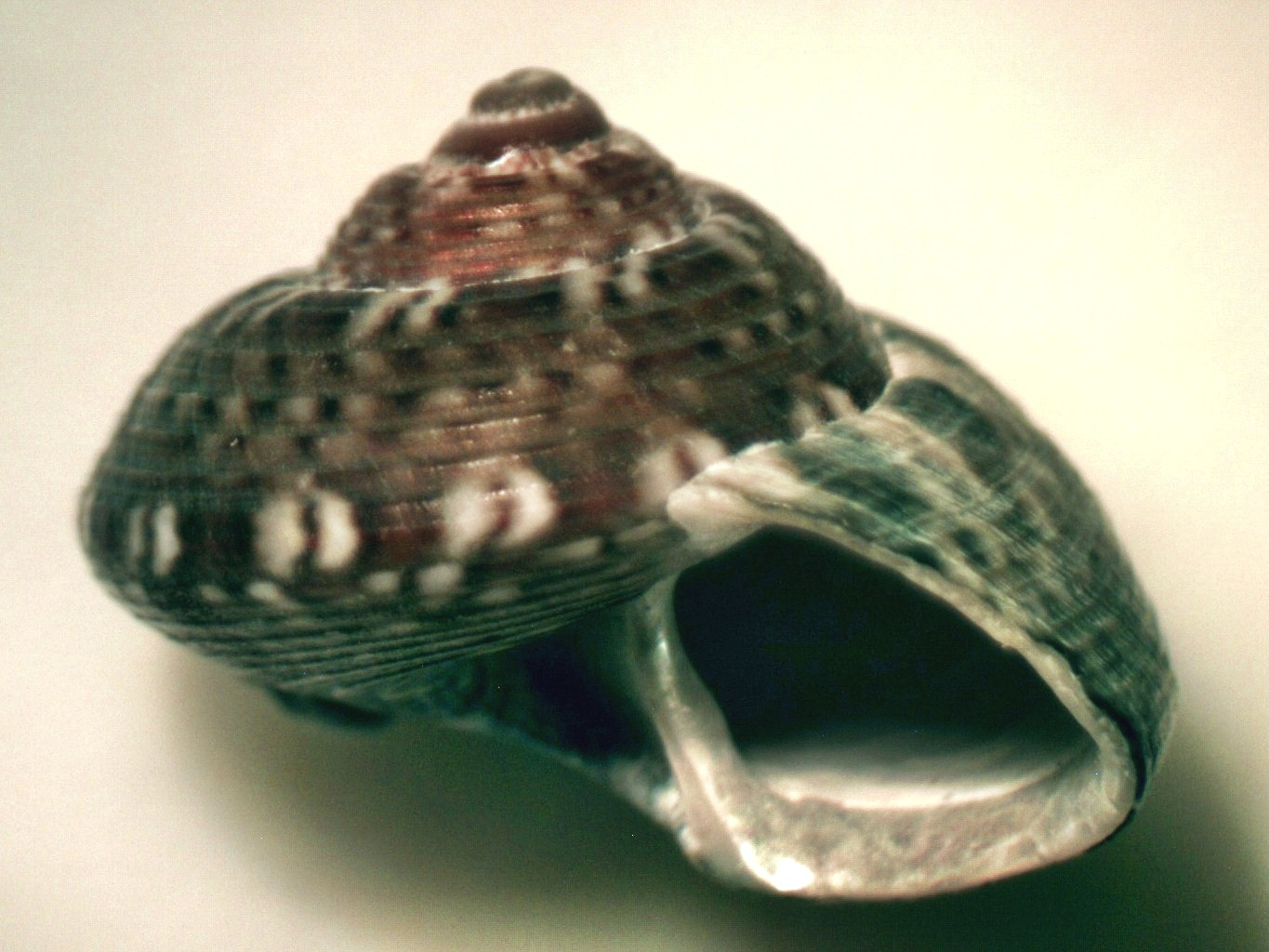
- Shell of Steromphala umbilicaris

Scientific classification
- Kingdom: Animalia
- Phylum: Mollusca
- Class: Gastropoda
- Subclass: Vetigastropoda
- Order: Trochida
- Family: Trochidae
- Genus: Steromphala
- Species: S. umbilicaris

Binomial name
- Steromphala umbilicaris (Linnaeus, 1758)

Synonyms
- Gibbula desserea Risso, 1826; Gibbula mediterranea Risso, 1826; Gibbula umbilicaris (Linnaeus, 1758); Gibbula umbilicaris umbilicaris (Linnaeus, 1758); Gibbula umbilicaris var. conica Monterosato, 1888; Gibbula umbilicaris var. globosa Monterosato, 1888; Gibbula umbilicaris var. gouini Monterosato, 1888; Gibbula umbilicaris var. intermedia Pallary, 1912; Gibbula umbilicaris var. nobrei Monterosato, 1888; Gibbula umbilicaris var. rubescens Monterosato, 1888; Trochus fuscatus Gmelin, 1791; Trochus latior Monterosato, 1880; Trochus latior var. albina Monterosato, 1880; Trochus umbilicaris Linnaeus, 1758; Trochus umbilicaris var. concolor Bucquoy, Dautzenberg & Dollfus, 1884; Trochus umbilicaris var. doriae Tapparone Canefri, 1869; Trochus umbilicaris var. soluta Bucquoy, Dautzenberg & Dollfus, 1884; Trochus umbilicaris var. tessellata Tapparone Canefri, 1869; Trochus umbilicaris var. undulata Bucquoy, Dautzenberg & Dollfus, 1884

= Steromphala umbilicaris =

Species of mollusc

Steromphala umbilicaris is a species of sea snail, a marine gastropod mollusk in the family Trochidae, the top snails.

== Description ==
The size of an adult shell varies between 10 mm and 25 mm. The conical shell is umbilicate. Its color is cinereous, reddish, or purplish-brown, obscurely clouded, dotted or flamed with white The conical spire is acuminate. There are about seven whorls, slightly convex, spirally striate, microscopically obliquely striate. The lirae are generally subobsolete on the last whorl. The periphery is obtusely angulate. The aperture is rather small, oblique, rounded-quadrate, angled at the base and smooth within. The columella is arcuate above, straightened below.

== Distribution ==
This marine species occurs in European waters and in the Mediterranean Sea.
