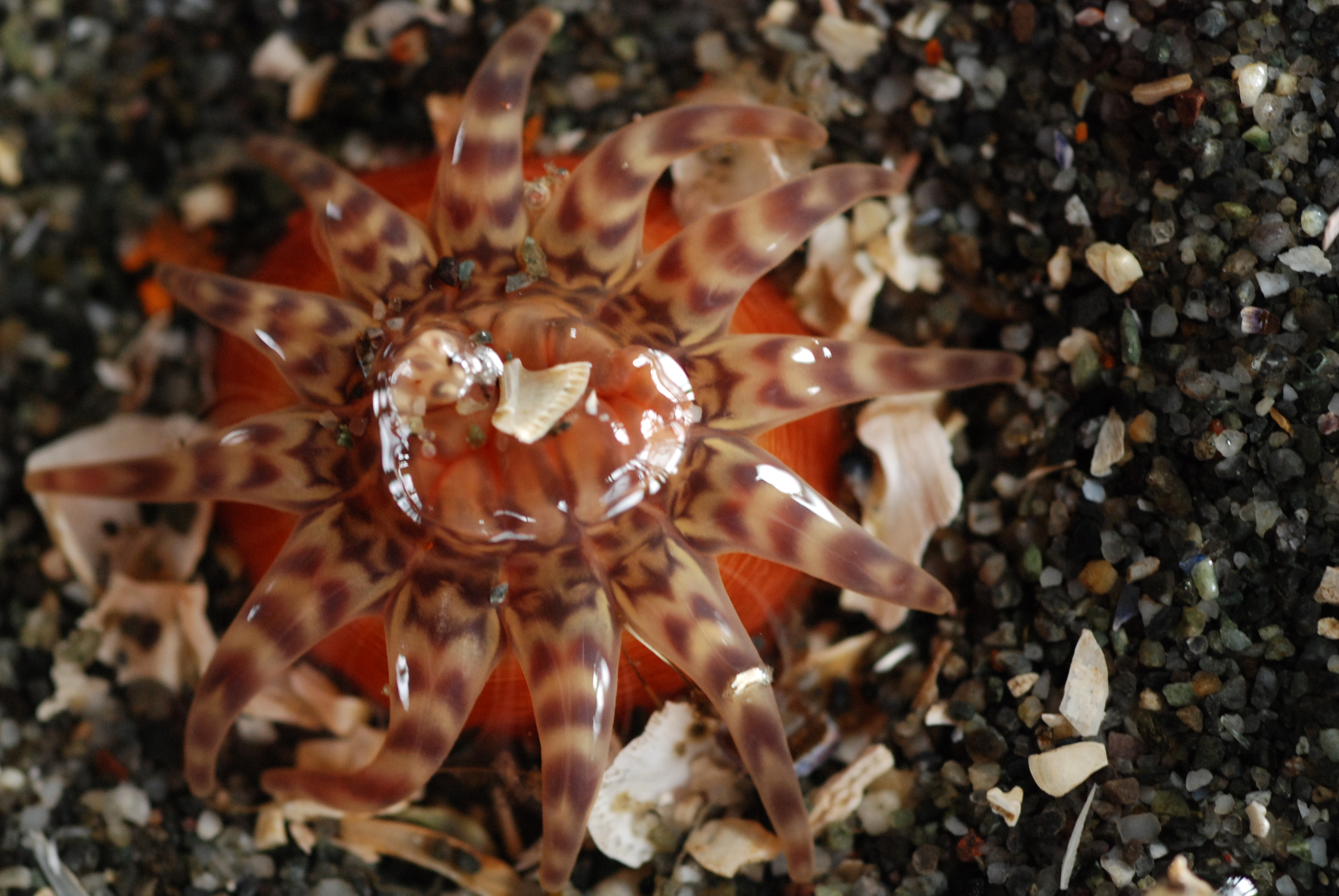
- Peachia quinquecapitata

Scientific classification
- Kingdom: Animalia
- Phylum: Cnidaria
- Subphylum: Anthozoa
- Class: Hexacorallia
- Order: Actiniaria
- Superfamily: Actinioidea
- Family: Haloclavidae; Verrill, 1899

Genera
- See text

= Haloclavidae =

Family of sea anemones

Haloclavidae is a family of sea anemones. Members of the family are found worldwide and many live largely buried in soft substrates with only their oral disc and tentacles protruding.

== Characteristics ==
Members of this family mostly have elongated columns which are often differentiated into different regions. The column is either smooth or has tubercles or suckers on its surface. The base is often rounded and used for digging but in some species it is flattened and adhesive to small objects. There is usually no sphincter but when one is present, it is endodermal. The tentacles are short and there are seldom more than 48, arranged cyclically. The mesenteries or internal tissue walls are few. There are no muscles attaching them to the basal disc but they do have strong retractor muscles. At least six pairs of the mesenteries are perfect, reaching from the base as far as the actinopharynx or throat of the anemone. There is a single, well defined siphonoglyph, a ciliated groove, which is often elongated and nearly detached from the rest of the actinopharynx.

== Genera ==
According to the World Register of Marine Species, the family includes the following genera:

- Anemonactis
- Antennapeachia Izumi, Yanagi & Fujita, 2016
- Eloactis
- Haloclava Verrill, 1899
- Harenactis
- Ilyanthus Forbes, 1840
- Mesacmaea Andres, 1883
- Metapeachia
- Oractis McMurrich, 1893
- Peachia Gosse, 1855
- Philomedusa
- Siphonactinia
- Stephanthus
- Synpeachia Yap, Fautin, Ramos & Tan, 2014
