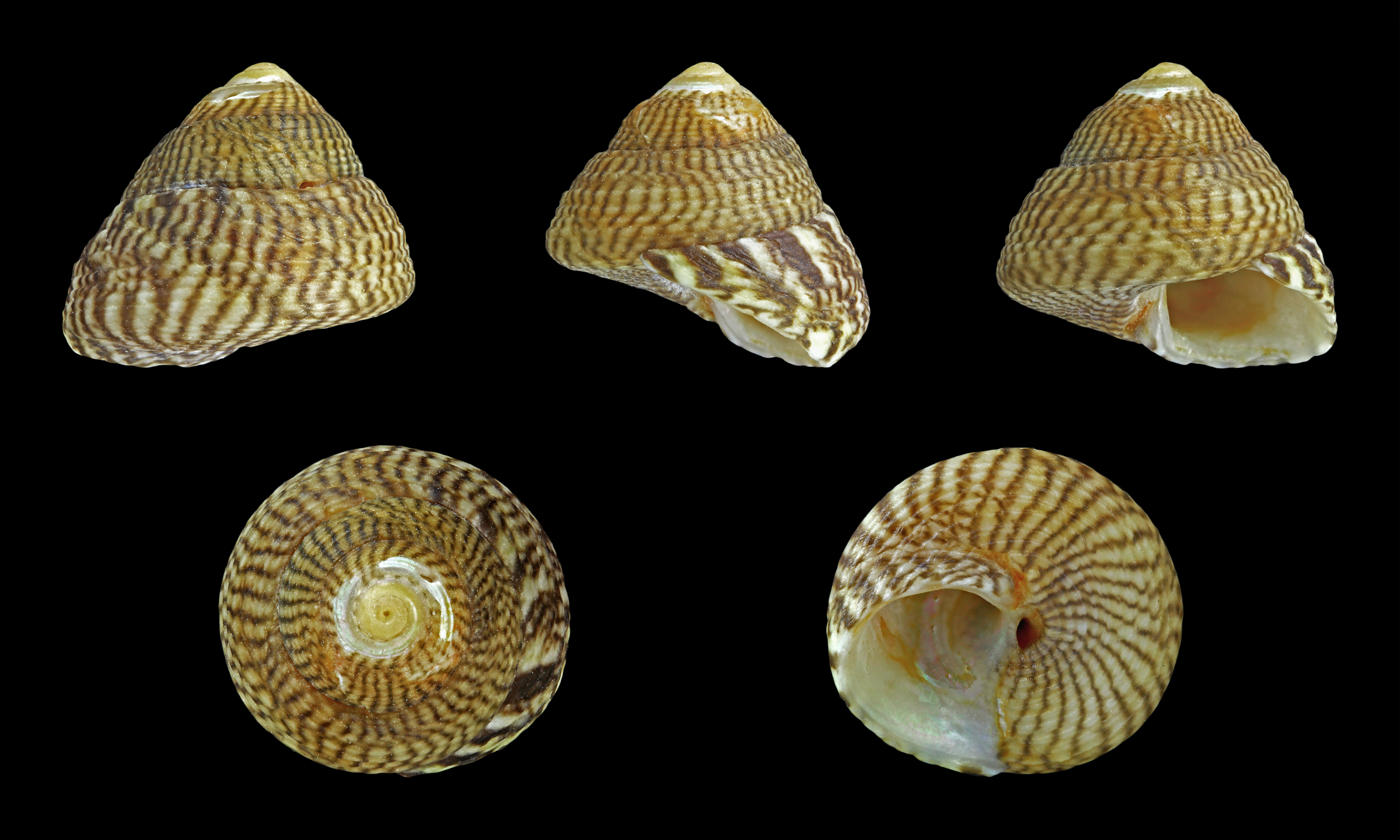
- Shell of Steromphala cineraria

Scientific classification
- Kingdom: Animalia
- Phylum: Mollusca
- Class: Gastropoda
- Subclass: Vetigastropoda
- Order: Trochida
- Family: Trochidae
- Subfamily: Cantharidinae
- Genus: Steromphala
- Species: S. cineraria

Binomial name
- Steromphala cineraria (Linnaeus, 1758)

Synonyms
- Gibbula cineraria (Linnaeus, 1758); Gibbula (Gibbula) cineraria cineraria (Linnaeus, 1758); Scrobiculinus strigosus (Gmelin, 1791); Scrobiculinus strigosus var. depressa Pallary, 1920; Scrobiculinus strigosus var. elevata Pallary, 1920; Scrobiculinus strigosus var. rubra Pallary, 1920; Trochus cinerarius Linnaeus, 1758 (basionym); Trochus cinerarius var. variegata Jeffreys, 1865; Trochus electissimus Bean in Thorpe, 1844; Trochus eltoniae R. T. Lowe, 1861; Trochus fumosus Philippi, 1849; Trochus inflatus Blainville, 1826; Trochus lineatus da Costa, 1778; Trochus philippii Aradas, 1847; Trochus strigosus Gmelin, 1791

= Steromphala cineraria =

Species of gastropod

Steromphala cineraria is a species of small sea snail, a marine gastropod mollusc in the family Trochidae, the top snails.

== Description ==
The size of the shell varies between 12 mm and 18 mm. The thick, narrowly umbilicate, rarely imperforate shell has a conical, thick shape. It is cinereous, densely marked with numerous narrow longitudinal brown or reddish lines, or broader stripes. The 6 whorls are flattened, with 7 or 8 thread-like spiral ridges on the upper surface of the body whorl, with often one or two finer striae between each ridge, and about a dozen fine ridge-like striae on the under side. The body whorl is angulate at the periphery, somewhat convex beneath. The aperture is subrhomboidal and smooth within. The columella is straightened in the middle. The umbilicus is narrow.

== Distribution ==
This species occurs in the North Sea, the Mediterranean Sea, and in the Atlantic Ocean (Azores, Canary Islands, Morocco).
