= Siphonoglyph =

Anatomical feature of the mouth of sea anemones and some corals

The siphonoglyph is a ciliated groove at one or both ends of the mouth of sea anemones and some corals. The siphonoglyph extends into a pharynx and is used to create currents of water into the pharynx. These water currents are important for respiration and maintenance of internal pressure. The presence of a siphonoglyph (or two siphonoglyphs) in several anthozoans (including species from the orders Zoantharia, Ceriantharia, Antipatharia, and Octocorallia) introduces an element of bilateral symmetry into the particular species' body plan (Beklemishev 1969). Some have argued that the presence of bilateral symmetry in these anthozoans is evidence that the ancestor to bilaterians and cnidarians may have had a bilaterally symmetrical body plan (Finnerty 2003).
