= A. elegans =

A. elegans may refer to:

- Acrogenotheca elegans, a fungus species found in Australia and New Zealand
- Actinoporus elegans, sea anemone known as the elegant anemone or brown striped anemone
- Adeorbis elegans, a gastropod species
- Aeger elegans, a fossil prawn species
- Afrotyphlops elegans, a snake species found on the island of Príncipe in São Tomé and Príncipe
- Agathosma elegans, a plant species
- Allogalathea elegans, the feather star squat lobster, crinoid squat lobster or elegant squat lobster, a species of squat lobster
- Anopheles elegans, a mosquito species
- Aplysiopsis elegans, a sacoglossan sea slug species
- Apophysomyces elegans, a filamentous fungus species
- Arizona elegans, the glossy snake, a snake species
- Arthonia elegans, a lichenized fungus species
- Asterella elegans, the elegant asterella, a liverwort species

== Synonyms ==
- Amphicypellus elegans, a synonym for Chytriomyces elegans, a fungus species
- Angostura elegans, a synonym for Conchocarpus elegans, a plant species found in Brazil
- Armillaria elegans, a synonym for Cystodermella elegans, a fungus species
