= Dendrochytridium =

Scientific classification
- Kingdom: Fungi
- Division: Chytridiomycota
- Class: Chytridiomycetes
- Order: Chytridiales
- Family: Chytridiaceae
- Genus: Dendrochytridium; Letcher, Longcore & M.J.Powell (2013)

Type species
- Dendrochytridium crassum Letcher, Longcore & M.J.Powell (2013)

Single-species genus of fungi

Dendrochytridium is a fungal genus in the order Chytridiales. It is monotypic, meaning it contains only one saprobic species, Dendrochytridium crassum, isolated from detritus collected from an Australian tree canopy. Both the genus and species were described as new to science in 2013. Phylogenetically, Dendrochytridium crassum is grouped in a clade with other fungi that possess Group II-type zoospores. These fungi include representatives from the genera Chytridium, Phlyctochytrium, Chytriomyces, and Polyphlyctis, all of which are classified in the family Chytridiaceae.

The generic name combines dendro (derived from Greek, meaning "tree"), which refers to the origin of the first collection, and Chytridium, the type genus of the order Chytridiales. The specific epithet crassum is Latin for "broad," referring to the broad rhizoids observed in this species.
