= Chytridium elegans =

Scientific classification
- Domain: Eukaryota
- Kingdom: Fungi
- Division: Chytridiomycota
- Class: Chytridiomycetes
- Order: Chytridiales
- Family: Chytridiaceae
- Genus: Chytridium
- Species: C. elegans

Binomial name
- Chytridium elegans Perronc. (1888)

Synonyms
- Woronina elegans (Perronc.) A. Fisch. (1892); Lagenidium elegans (Perronc.) Cif. (1962); Myzocytiopsis elegans (Perronc.) M.W. Dick, 1997

Species of fungus

Chytridium elegans is a species of fungus in the family Chytridiaceae.
