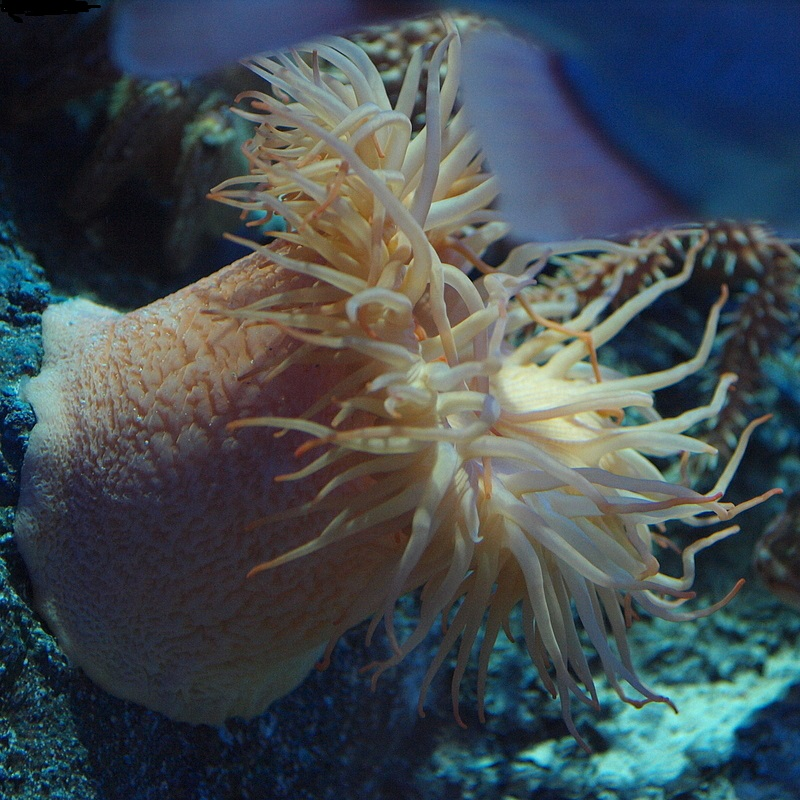

Scientific classification
- Kingdom: Animalia
- Phylum: Cnidaria
- Subphylum: Anthozoa
- Class: Hexacorallia
- Order: Actiniaria
- Family: Actinostolidae
- Genus: Actinostola
- Species: A. callosa

Binomial name
- Actinostola callosa (Verrill, 1882)

Synonyms
- Actinostella callosa (Verrill, 1882); Actinostola (Urticina) callosa (Verrill, 1882); Actinostola atrostoma Stephenson, 1918; Actinostola sibirica Carlgren, 1901; Catadiomene atrostoma Stephenson, 1918; Urticina callosa Verrill, 1882 (original binomen)

= Actinostola callosa =

Species of sea anemone

Actinostola callosa is a species of sea anemones in the family Actinostolidae in the order Actiniaria. It is a deep sea species and occurs in both Pacific and Atlantic Oceans from the continental shelf to abyssal depths.

== Description ==
A. callosa has a cylindrical column up to 60 mm (2.4 in) tall that is broader than it is high; the pedal disc can be 90 mm (3.5 in) in diameter. The column has regularly arranged, conspicuous tubercles and there are four whorls of tentacles. The general colour of this anemone is yellowish-white.

== Distribution and habitat ==
A. callosa is known from both the North Atlantic Ocean and the Pacific Ocean. It occurs on the East Pacific Rise, a ridge in the mid-Pacific Ocean. It occurs from the continental shelf to abyssal depths, generally in the range 84 to 2,915 m (280 to 9,560 ft). It occurs on rock, sand or mud, and on shells or other objects on the seafloor.

== Ecology ==
Some sea anemones have long slender tentacles adapted to catch plankton, but A. callosa has relatively short, stubby tentacles, heavily armed with nematocysts, enabling it to capture larger prey. This species is quite common in Norway at the bottom of fjords such as Lurefjord and Sognefjord; here it feeds extensively on the helmet jellyfish (Periphylla periphylla) which has proliferated in these fiords.

A. callosa contains about 30% lipids which are in the form of unsaturated fats and long-chain fatty acids. This is in contrast to the tropical Condylactis gigantea, which has the same proportion of lipids, but in this case the lipids are saturated. The difference is likely due to the cold-water anemone needing membrane fluidity and a readily available source of energy that is quick to mobilise at low temperatures.
