= Elegant anemone =

Elegant anemone may refer to two different species of sea anemone:

- Actinoporus elegans, found in the tropical Atlantic Ocean
- Sagartia elegans, found in coastal areas of north-western Europe
