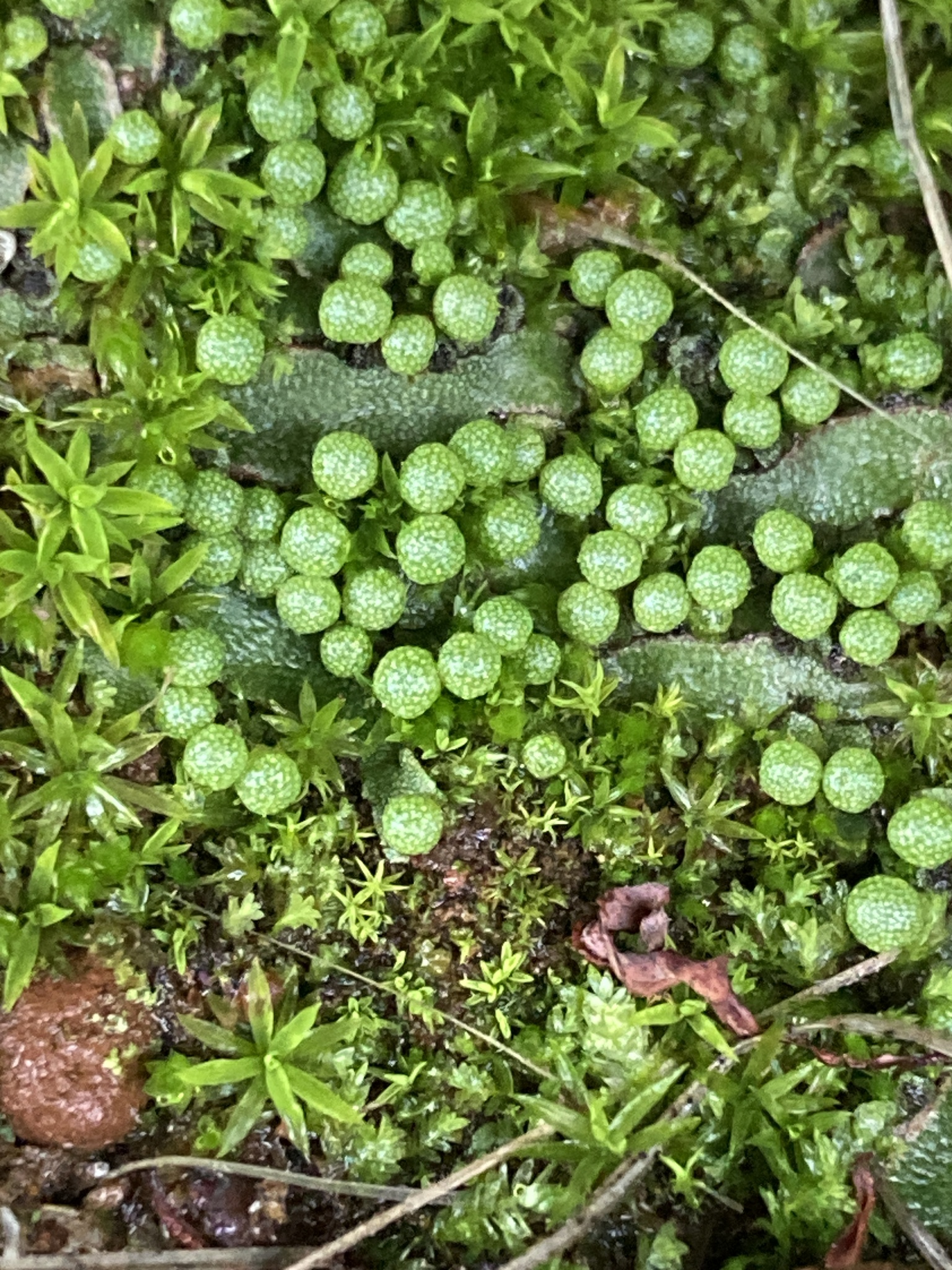
- El Dorado County, California, 2024

Conservation status
- Vulnerable (NatureServe)

Scientific classification
- Kingdom: Plantae
- Clade: Embryophytes
- Division: Marchantiophyta
- Class: Marchantiopsida
- Order: Marchantiales
- Family: Aytoniaceae
- Genus: Asterella
- Species: A. bolanderi

Binomial name
- Asterella bolanderi (Austin) Underw.

Synonyms
- Fimbraria bolanderi Austin; Fimbraria violacea Austin; Asterella violacea (Austin) Underw.; Asterella bolanderi subsp. bolanderi

= Asterella bolanderi =

Species of plant

Asterella bolanderi is a liverwort in the family Aytoniaceae. It is found in the undergrowth of chaparral habitat and on shady banks. Commonly found within Northern California at elevations lower than 3000 feet, its distribution also ranges along the coast into Southern California. Other members of the Asterella genus include A. californica and A. palmeri.
