= Chytriomyces elegans =

Scientific classification
- Domain: Eukaryota
- Kingdom: Fungi
- Division: Chytridiomycota
- Class: Chytridiomycetes
- Order: Chytridiales
- Family: Chytriomycetaceae
- Genus: Chytriomyces
- Species: C. elegans

Binomial name
- Chytriomyces elegans (Ingold) Dogma 1976

Synonyms
- Amphicypellus elegans Ingold 1944

Species of fungus

Chytriomyces elegans is a species of fungus in the genus Chytriomyces. It is saprophytic on dead cells of Ceratium hirundinella and Peridinium.
