= Entophlyctis =

Scientific classification
- Domain: Eukaryota
- Kingdom: Fungi
- Division: Chytridiomycota
- Class: Chytridiomycetes
- Order: Chytridiales
- Family: Chytriomycetaceae
- Genus: Entophlyctis; A.Fisch. (1892)

Type species
- Entophlyctis cienkowskiana (Zopf) A.Fisch. (1892)

Species
- ~20

Genus of fungi

Entophlyctis is a genus of fungi currently classified in the family Chytriomycetaceae. The genus, widespread in temperate regions and contains about 20 species.

== Species ==
- E. apiculata
- E. aurantiaca
- E. aurea
- E. brassicae
- E. bulbigera
- E. caudiformis
- E. cienkowskiana
- E. confervae-glomeratae
- E. crenata
- E. heliomorpha
- E. lobata
- E. luteolus
- E. mammilliformis
- E. maxima
- E. molesta
- E. obscura
- E. reticulospora
- E. salicorniae
- E. sphaerioides
- E. texana
- E. willoughbyi
- E. woronichinii
