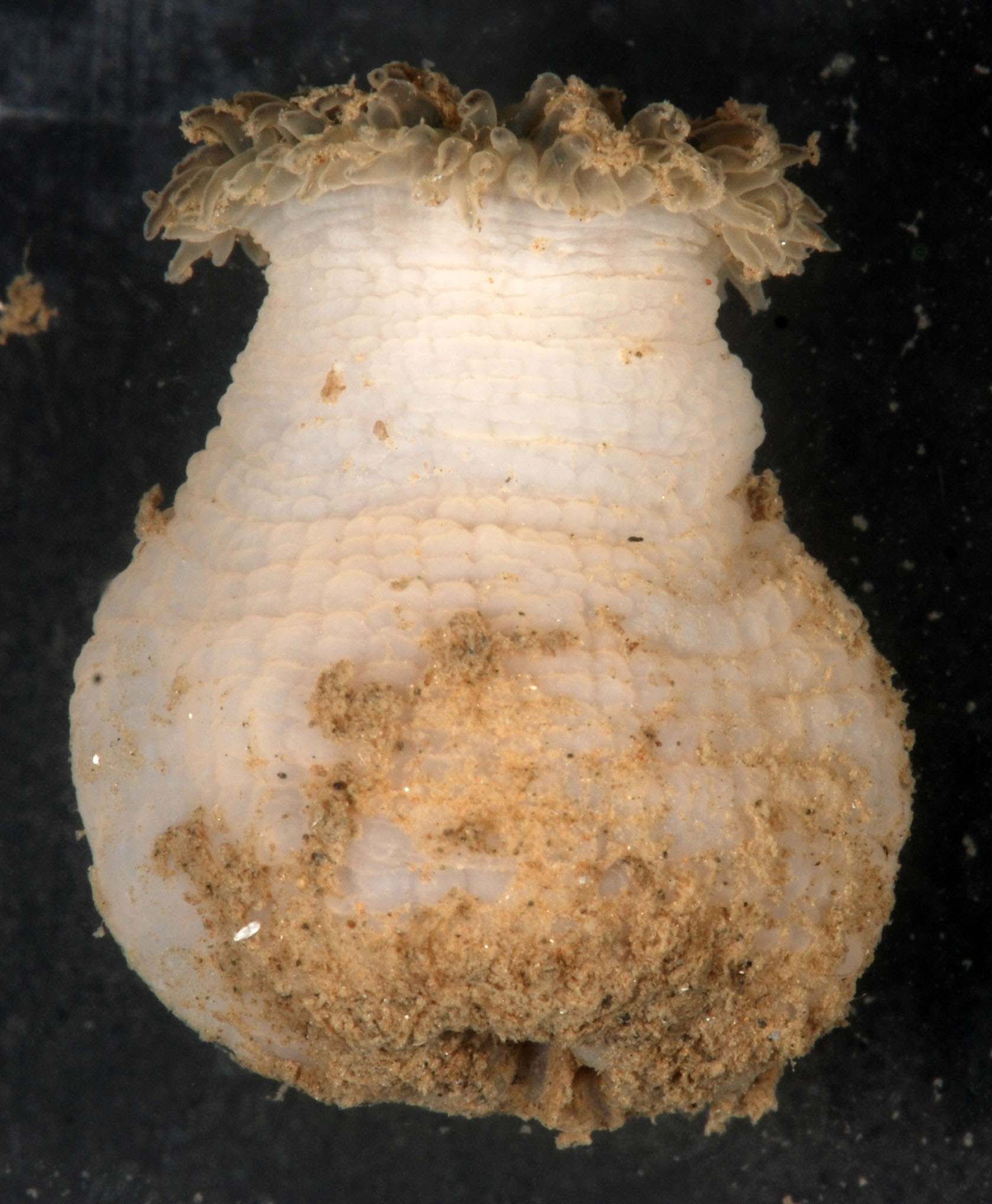

Scientific classification
- Kingdom: Animalia
- Phylum: Cnidaria
- Subphylum: Anthozoa
- Class: Hexacorallia
- Order: Actiniaria
- Family: Actinostolidae
- Genus: Paranthus
- Species: P. rapiformis

Binomial name
- Paranthus rapiformis (Le Sueur, 1817)

Synonyms
- Actinia rapiformis Le Sueur, 1817; Ammophilactis rapiformis (Le Sueur, 1817); Paractis rapiformis (Le Sueur, 1817)

= Paranthus rapiformis =

Species of sea anemone

Paranthus rapiformis, the onion anemone, is a species of sea anemone in the family Actinostolidae. It was first described by the French naturalist Charles Alexandre Lesueur in 1817 and is native to the northwestern Atlantic Ocean and the Gulf of Mexico.

== Description ==
P. rapiformis is a small white sea anemone which burrows into the sediment, usually subtidally, but it may be exposed at extreme low water. The base of the column is expanded which anchors it in place, and it is usually attached to a submerged stone or shell. When covered with water, the short tentacles spread out over the surface of the sand. When it is disturbed, the tentacles retract and the column inflates to form a globular shape; this is translucent, with longitudinal white stripes, and resembles a small onion.

== Biology ==
As a burrowing sea anemone, the pedal disc of P. rapiformis is replaced by a rounded end known as a "physa" which is used for digging. First the physa is pushed into the soft sediment, then the anemone swells its body wall to anchor itself in place while pushing the physa further into the sand. Now it inflates the physa and deflates the body wall, using its strong longitudinal muscles to draw the upper part towards the base, during which process, the physa inverts. These two steps are repeated as it works its way deeper into the sediment.

The burrow is cylindrical and the vertical sides are lined with mucus; it is commonly 8 cm (3 in) long and 2.5 cm (1 in) wide, but can be much larger, however it collapses if the sea anemone is removed. A dislodged anemone may adopt a globular shape and be rolled about on the sand by the sea until it finds a less turbulent place where it can burrow.
