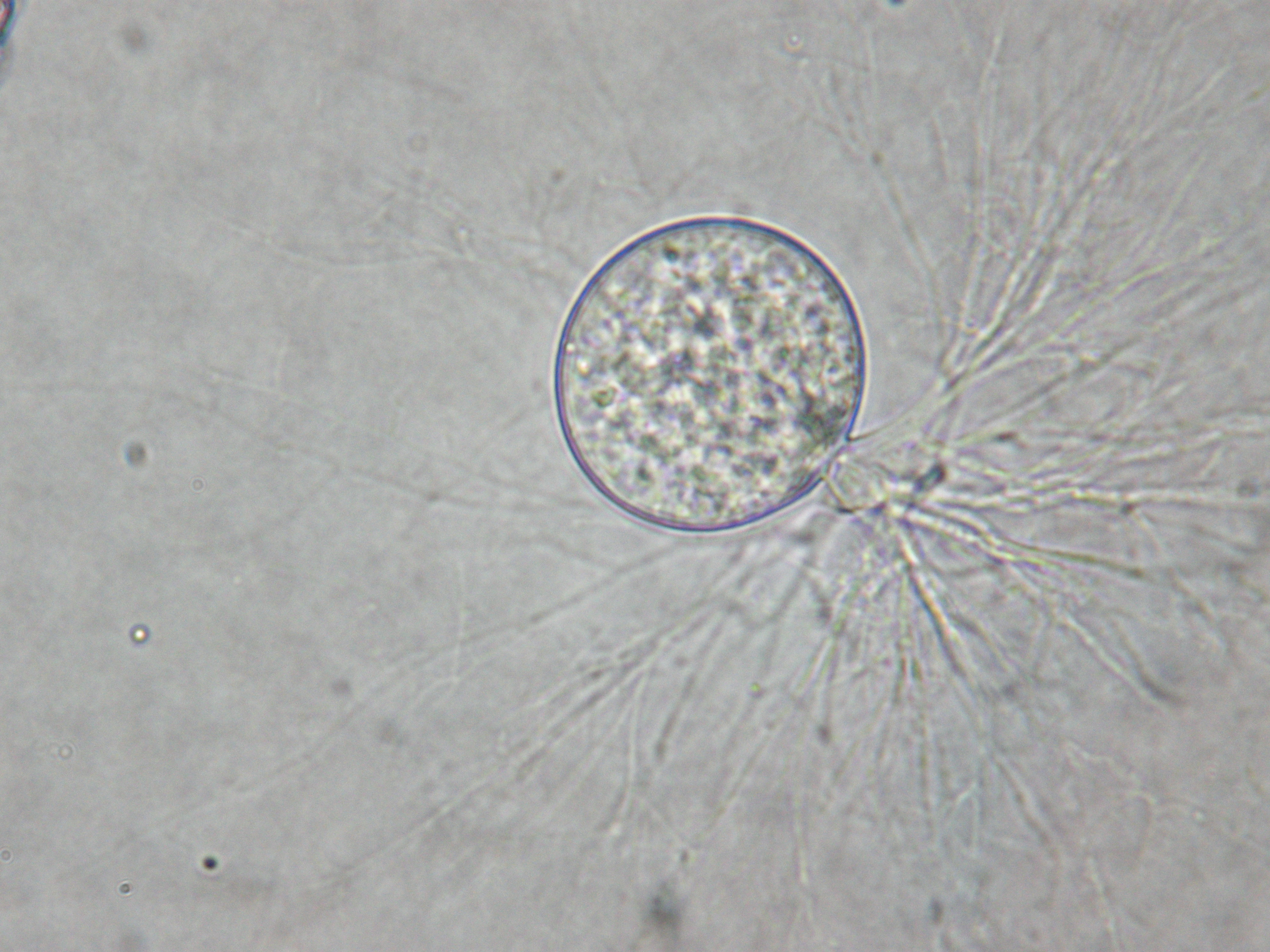
- Chytriomyces hyalinus growing on nutrient agar

Scientific classification
- Kingdom: Fungi
- Division: Chytridiomycota
- Class: Chytridiomycetes
- Order: Chytridiales
- Family: Chytriomycetaceae
- Genus: Chytriomyces; Karling (1945)

Type species
- Chytriomyces hyalinus Karling (1945)

= Chytriomyces =

Genus of fungi

Chytriomyces is the type genus of fungi in the family Chytriomycetaceae. The genus was described by mycologist John Sidney Karling in 1945. The family, created by Peter Letcher in 2011, contains species with a Group I-type zoospore, distinguishing it from Chytridiaceae members, which have a Group II-type zoospore.

== Taxonomy ==
J. S. Karling circumscribed Chytriomyces in 1945 for the species C. hyalinus and C. aureus. The genus was intended to include monocentric chytrids with operculate, apophysate, epibiotic zoosporangia that exhibited vesicular zoospore discharge. Another requirement was resting spores that function as prosporangia during germination. With time and the addition of species, the generic concept was altered to include species lacking one or more of these features. Karling was not clear as to which of his species was the type; C. hyalinus was later designated the type. With the use of molecular phylogenetics, it has been determined that several species in this genus did not belong. For example, it was shown that C. poculatus and C. angularis were better classified in the new genus Lobulomyces.

== Species ==
- C. appendiculatus
- C. aureus
- C. closterii
- C. confervae
- C. cosmaridis
- C. elegans
- C. fructicosus
- C. gilgaiensis
- C. heliozoicola
- C. hyalinus
- C. laevis
- C. lucidus
- C. macro-operculatus
- C. mammillifer
- C. mortierellae
- C. multioperculatus
- C. nagatoroensis
- C. parasiticus
- C. reticulatus
- C. reticulosporus
- C. rhizidiomycetis
- C. rotoruaensis
- C. stellatus
- C. suburceolatus
- C. tabellariae
- C. vallesiacus
- C. verrucosus
- C. willoughbyi
