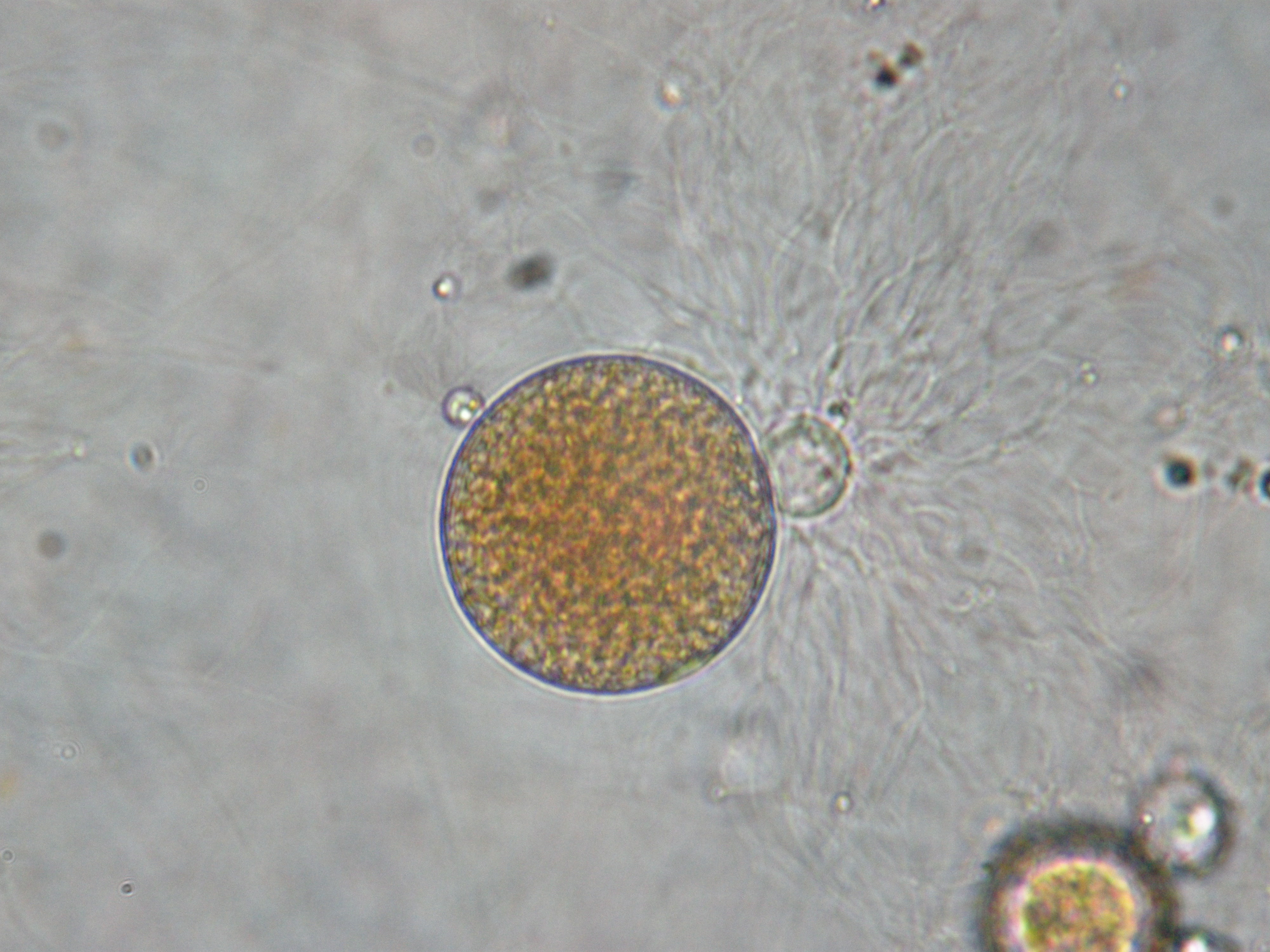
- Rhizoclosmatium aurantiacum zoosporangium with characteristic orange coloration and apophysis.

Scientific classification
- Kingdom: Fungi
- Division: Chytridiomycota
- Class: Chytridiomycetes
- Order: Chytridiales
- Family: Chytriomycetaceae
- Genus: Rhizoclosmatium; H.E.Petersen (1903)

Type species
- Rhizoclosmatium globosum H.E.Petersen (1909)

Species
- R. aurantiacum R. globosum R. hyalinum R. marinum

= Rhizoclosmatium =

Genus of fungi

Rhizoclosmatium is a genus of fungi classified in the family Chytriomycetaceae. It was circumscribed by Danish mycologist Henning Eiler Petersen in 1903. The genus contains four species.
