= Ophiodiscus =

Scientific classification
- Domain: Eukaryota
- Kingdom: Animalia
- Phylum: Cnidaria
- Subphylum: Anthozoa
- Class: Hexacorallia
- Order: Actiniaria
- Family: Actinostolidae
- Genus: Ophiodiscus; Hertwig, 1882

Genus of sea anemones

Ophiodiscus is a genus of cnidarians belonging to the family Actinostolidae.

The species of this genus are found in America.

Species:

- Ophiodiscus annulatus Hertwig, 1882
- Ophiodiscus sulcatus Hertwig, 1882
