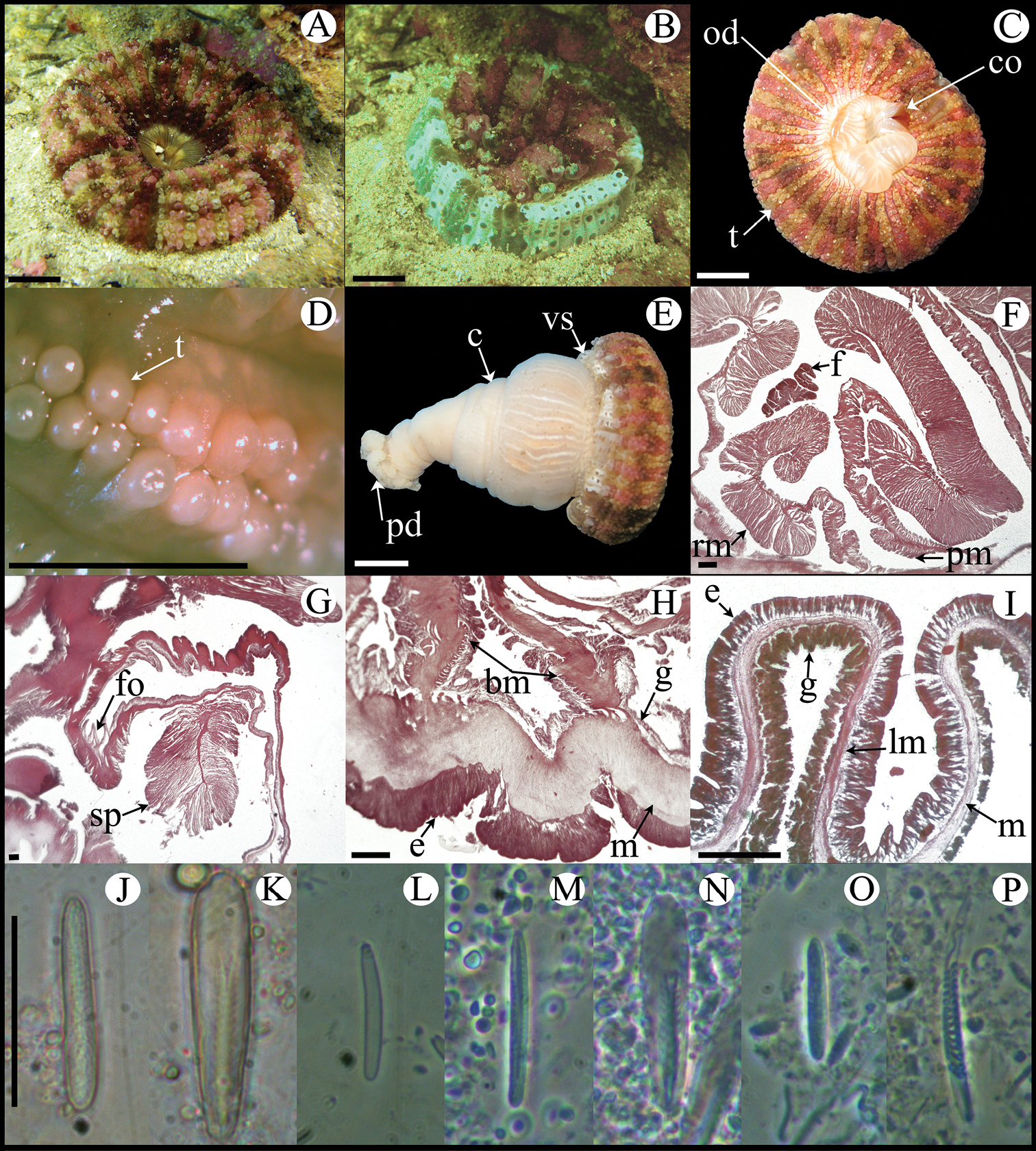

Scientific classification
- Domain: Eukaryota
- Kingdom: Animalia
- Phylum: Cnidaria
- Class: Hexacorallia
- Order: Actiniaria
- Family: Capneidae
- Genus: Actinoporus

= Actinoporus =

Genus of sea anemones

Actinoporus is a genus of sea anemones of family Aurelianidae. It comprises the following species:

- Actinoporus elegans
- Actinoporus elongatus
