= Mucophilus =

Scientific classification
- Kingdom: Fungi
- Division: Chytridiomycota
- Class: Chytridiomycetes
- Order: Chytridiales
- Family: incertae sedis
- Genus: Mucophilus; Plehn (1920)
- Species: M. cyprini

Binomial name
- Mucophilus cyprini Plehn (1920)

Single-species genus of fungi

Mucophilus is a fungal genus in the Chytridiales of uncertain familial placement. A monotypic genus, it contains the single species Mucophilus cyprini, described from Germany by Marianne Plehn in 1920.
