= Anthosactis pearseae =

Scientific classification
- Domain: Eukaryota
- Kingdom: Animalia
- Phylum: Cnidaria
- Class: Hexacorallia
- Order: Actiniaria
- Family: Actinostolidae
- Genus: Anthosactis
- Species: A. pearseae

Binomial name
- Anthosactis pearseae Daly & Gusmão, 2007

Species of sea anemone

Anthosactis pearseae is a species of sea anemone in the family Actinostolidae. It was discovered in 2007, living in the body of a dead whale at the bottom of the Pacific Ocean where the water was approximately 1.8 miles (3.0 km) deep, at Monterey Canyon, which is approximate 25 miles off the coast of Monterey, California. An article in Science Daily described it as "... small and white and roughly cube-shaped. It is about the size of a human molar, and even looks like a tooth with small tentacles on one side."
