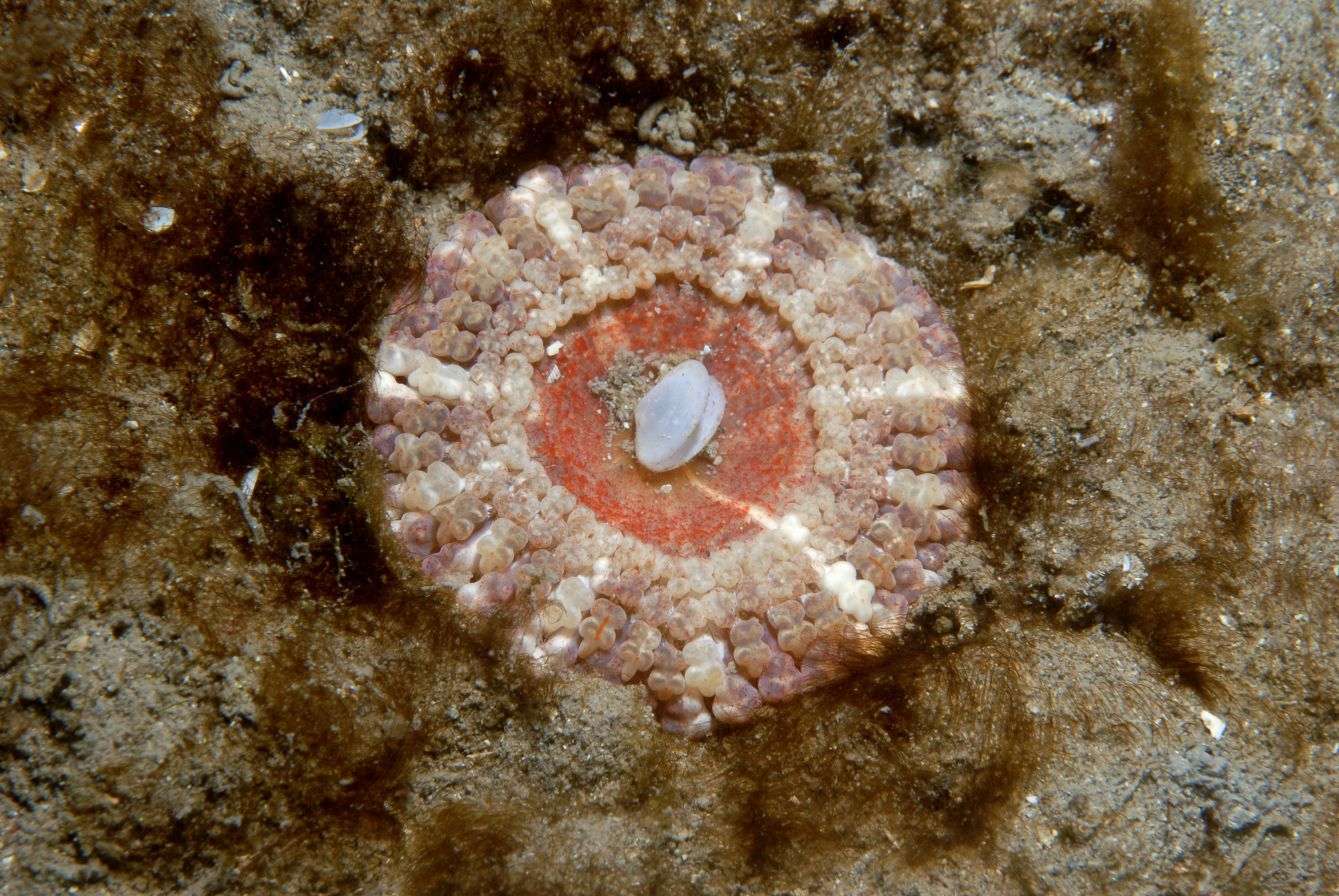
- Capnea sanguinea

Scientific classification
- Kingdom: Animalia
- Phylum: Cnidaria
- Subphylum: Anthozoa
- Class: Hexacorallia
- Order: Actiniaria
- Superfamily: Actinostoloidea
- Family: Capneidae

= Capneidae =

Family of cnidarians

Capneidae is a family of cnidarians belonging to the order Actiniaria.

Genera:

- Actinoporus Duchassaing, 1850
- Aureliania Gosse, 1860
- Capnea Forbes, 1841
