= Acrogenotheca =

Scientific classification
- Kingdom: Fungi
- Division: Ascomycota
- Class: Dothideomycetes
- Subclass: incertae sedis
- Genus: Acrogenotheca; Theiss. & Syd.

Type species
- Acrogenotheca pulcherrima Bat. & Cif.

Genus of fungi

Acrogenotheca is a genus of fungi in the class Dothideomycetes. The relationship of this taxon to other taxa within the class is unknown (incertae sedis).

== Species ==
- Acrogenotheca elegans
- Acrogenotheca ornata
- Acrogenotheca pulcherrima

== See also ==
- List of Dothideomycetes genera incertae sedis
