= Ichthyochytrium =

Scientific classification
- Kingdom: Fungi
- Division: Chytridiomycota
- Class: Chytridiomycetes
- Order: Chytridiales
- Family: incertae sedis
- Genus: Ichthyochytrium; Plehn (1920)
- Species: I. vulgare

Binomial name
- Ichthyochytrium vulgare Plehn (1920)

Single-species genus of fungi

Ichthyochytrium is a fungal genus in the Chytridiales of uncertain familial placement. A monotypic genus, it contains the single rare species Ichthyochytrium vulgare, described from Germany by Marianne Plehn in 1920. A parasite of freshwater fishes, it forms spherical bodies measuring 5–20 μm that have refractive granules. It typically attacks the lung and gills.
