= Anthosactis =

Scientific classification
- Domain: Eukaryota
- Kingdom: Animalia
- Phylum: Cnidaria
- Class: Hexacorallia
- Order: Actiniaria
- Family: Actinostolidae
- Genus: Anthosactis; Danielssen, 1890

Genus of sea anemones

Anthosactis is a genus of cnidarians belonging to the family Actinostolidae.

Species:

- Anthosactis capensis Carlgren, 1938
- Anthosactis epizoica (Pax, 1922)
- Anthosactis excavata (Hertwig, 1882)
- Anthosactis ingolfi Carlgren, 1921
- Anthosactis janmayeni Danielssen, 1890
- Anthosactis nomados White, Wakefield Pagels & Fautin, 1999
- Anthosactis pearseae Daly & Gusmão, 2007
