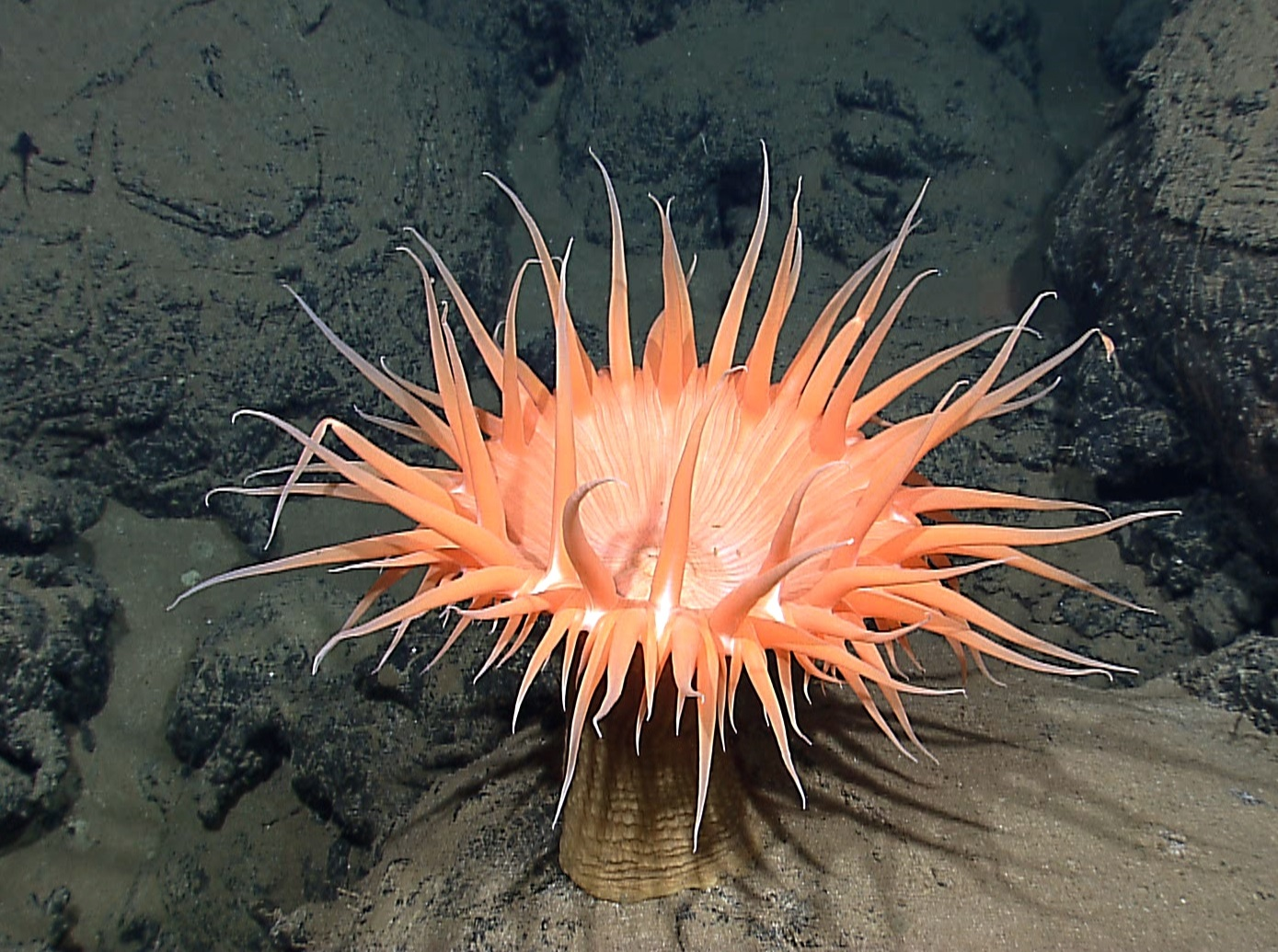
- Actinostola sp.

Scientific classification
- Domain: Eukaryota
- Kingdom: Animalia
- Phylum: Cnidaria
- Class: Hexacorallia
- Order: Actiniaria
- Suborder: Enthemonae
- Superfamily: Actinostoloidea; Carlgren, 1932

Families
- See text

= Actinostoloidea =

Superfamily of sea anemones

Actinostoloidea is a superfamily of sea anemones in the order Actiniaria.

Families in the superfamily Actinostoloidea include:

- Actinostolidae
- Halcampulactidae
