= Marianne Plehn =

German professor and zoologist (1863–1946)

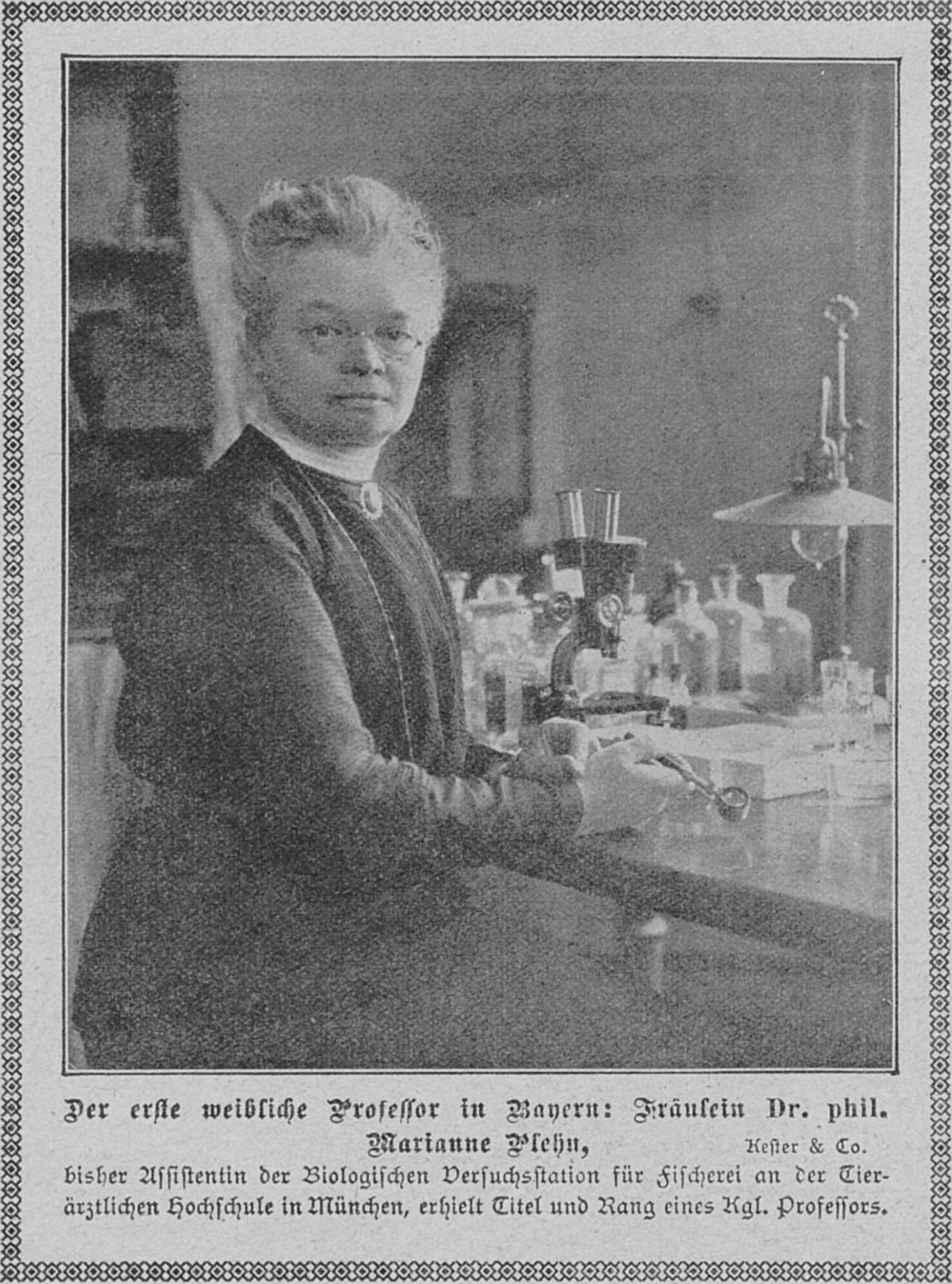
- Born: 30 October 1863
- Died: 18 January 1946 (aged 82)
- Occupation: Zoologist

Marianne Plehn (30 October 1863 – 18 January 1946) was a German zoologist. She was the first woman to be awarded a doctorate at the ETH Zurich and the first woman to be appointed as professor in Bavaria in 1914. Plehn is commemorated in the names of three polyclads and 12 disease agents of fishes. The breadth of her research on diseases of fishes defined the scientific study in this area. She published 114 scientific papers on the subject. She worked with Bruno Hofer and has been honoured as one of the founders of fish pathology.

== Early life ==
Plehn was born 1863 in Lubochen, then part of west Prussia. She had five siblings and her father was a manor lord. Her older brothers studied medicine. Aged 27 Plehn moved to Zurich to take up university education in zoology, botany and geology. With financial support from her uncle she studied at the ETH Zurich, where she passed the examination as instructor for natural science in 1893. In 1896 she received her PhD in zoology, making her the first woman awarded a doctorate by the ETH Zurich. Natural science was part of the philosophy department of the University of Zurich and while preparing for her doctorate she met and formed a lifelong friendship with Ricarda Huch, with whom she continued to exchange letters.

== Career ==
In 1898 she was appointed as assistant lecturer at the Bavarian Biological Experimental Institute (Bayerische Biologische Versuchsanstalt), at the School of Veterinary Medicine in Munich, Bavaria. There she worked with Bruno Hofer, who is considered the founder of fish pathology. Plehn dedicated her life to research and her working day was spent in the laboratory and the field. She turned down an appointment in Vienna and continued to work in Hofer's shadow, who as director presented their work in public appearances. From 1899 Plehn published her findings on fish diseases and parasites, often producing several papers a year. Knowledge of fish physiology was limited, and little information was available on diseases and methods for their prevention. Few scientists carried out research in fish pathology. Plehn's research agenda was determined by the needs of breeders supplying stock to lakes and streams in and around Munich and upper Bavaria. Her research was pioneering and often conducted under time pressure as breeders faced considerable financial losses. She carried out work at the institute's research station in Starnberg, which had been established in 1900 prompted by criticism the institute did not diagnose diseases and issued advice on their control quickly enough. Her most important tools were the microscope and dissecting instruments, as she tried to determine the reasons for fish die-offs.

One of her early published studies was an investigation of raised scales in minnows in 1902. Between 1903 and 1904 she identified the agent causing red disease in carp species, the Bacterium cyprinicida, and demonstrated more hygienic conditions reducing the problem. She conducted research into fish parasitology. In 1903 she discovered the Trypanoplasma cyprini (now called Cryptobia cyprini Plehn) in carp blood, while investigating protozoan parasites. Between 1904-06 she published five papers on stagger disease in Salmonidae (salmon and trout group). Her later research on the subject prompted her to designate a new genus of parasites, the Lentospora, now Myxobolus. In 1906 she published the book Die Fische des Meeres und der Binnengewässer (Fishes of the Lakes and Inland Waters) with illustrations aimed at the public and fish breeders. In 1905 and 1908 she published the results of two studies on the trematode worm Sanguinicola armata und inermis. She published her findings on kidney disease in 1908. Her findings on liver disease in Salmonidae were published in 1909 and 1915.

Plehn considered her employment in Munich and the research opportunities in Starnberg ideal. But perhaps it was the only one available to her in an area that only a small number of scientists worked in. She frequently complained of overwork. In 1909 she was promoted to the position of Konservatorin (curator) at the Starnberg research station and her annual salary was raised to 3,000 Mark. In Munich she moved to a two-room apartment, which accommodated her large library and piano. She received visits from her sister, many Zurich friends and from Huch, who lived in Munich with her young daughter. She spent much of her working life at Starnberg and took her holidays outside the summer season as she and colleagues had to ensure that the research station was always staffed. While many of her friends took part in the women's movement, she did not and instead focused on research and the prolific publication of research findings. Until 1939 she had a work room at the research station, even after official retirement.

Bacterial infections in Salmonidae became a major focus in her research and she continued to study and publish on the subject. She examined in great detail the bacteria causing epidemics of furunculoses (abscesses) and fluorescence (open sores). Other areas of interest included studies of algal infections in carp, and two of the agents involved in bacterial infections, which now bear her name - the Branchiomyces sanguinis Plehn (the agent in gill rot) and Nephromyces piscium Plehn (now called Penicillium piscium Plehn).

Plehn investigated skeletal malformations and cancerous growths in fishes, and other cold-blooded animals. This research was pioneering and she demonstrated that tumours in cold-blooded animals were similar to those in warm-blooded animals. Her research was followed with interest by scientists in cancer research and she spoke on the subject at the international conference on cancer in Paris in 1910 and later in Vienna. Two of her most important papers on the subject were published as monographs after they appeared in scientific journals. As a result of her research she was made an honorary member of the International Society for Cancer Research.

In Germany it was not possible for women to qualify as lecturers, thus Plehn was awarded the title royal professor in 1914 by King Ludwig III of Bavaria for her great contribution to fish pathology. This made her the first woman to be granted a professorship in Bavaria. But a teaching certificate was not linked to this, and it only became possible for women to acquire such qualification in 1919. Plehn did not seek such qualification. Instead she continued to focus on research at the Bavarian Biological Experimental Institute. In 1920 Plehn published reports on two skin and gill parasites, the Ichthyochytrium vulgare and the Mucophilus cyprini (later identified as a rickettsia).

In 1924 she published her second book Praktikum der Fischkrankheiten as practical guide for fish breeders, hatchery managers, fishermen, fish biologists and veterinarians. Her publisher initially wished to publish it as an update of Hofer's 1904 Handbuch der Fischkrankheiten. But the field had changed so much in 20 years that Plehn took a different approach. Plehn focused on the major brood of fish in Bavaria, the Salmonidae and Cyprinidae (salmon/trout and carp) and included illustrations and practical guidance based on 20 years of her work. The book became a standard for use in fisheries, and the basis for subsequent research by other scientists. The illustrations and photographs continued to be used for decades.

Although she was a professor, her teaching activities were limited to courses at the Fisheries School at Starnberg, which was attached to the research station. In 1927 aged 64 she was promoted to Hauptkonservatorin (chief curator) at the research station. She had long been the foremost authority on fish disease, and known all over Germany. She was known as the Fischdoktorin and had a reputation for being cultivated and charming, with a quiet sense of humour. She retired on a small pension in 1928, and was awarded an honorary doctorate from the faculty of veterinary medicine at LMU Munich, making her the first women to receive such an honorary doctorate from LMU. She continued to be a presence at the Starnberg research station, giving lectures and putting her knowledge at the disposal of colleagues. Plehn worked on an expanded edition of Praktikum der Fischkrankheiten until 1942. Although she was an outspoken critic of Adolf Hitler, the Nazi authorities did not force her to stop her teaching and research work.

But she was only given a leading position when male researchers were drafted for military service during World War II. Aged almost 80, she took over the management of the institute. The institute was bombed out in 1943, the research station in Starnberg was bombed out in January 1944 and her apartment in Munich was destroyed six months later. By that time she had moved in with friends in Grafrath. In 1946 she died in Grafrath. Her urn was buried in the Munich Nordfriedhof and moved to a mass grave in 1970.

== Legacy ==
Plehn is commemorated in the names of three polyclads and 12 disease agents of fishes. Not all of her research findings stood the test of time as research methods advanced, but the tremendous breadth of her research on diseases of fishes defined the scientific study in this area. All in all she published 114 scientific papers on the subject. The Allgemeine Fischerei-Zeitung, in which she had frequently published, commemorated her in 1963 on the 100th anniversary of her birth. She was honoured as one of the founders of fish pathology.
