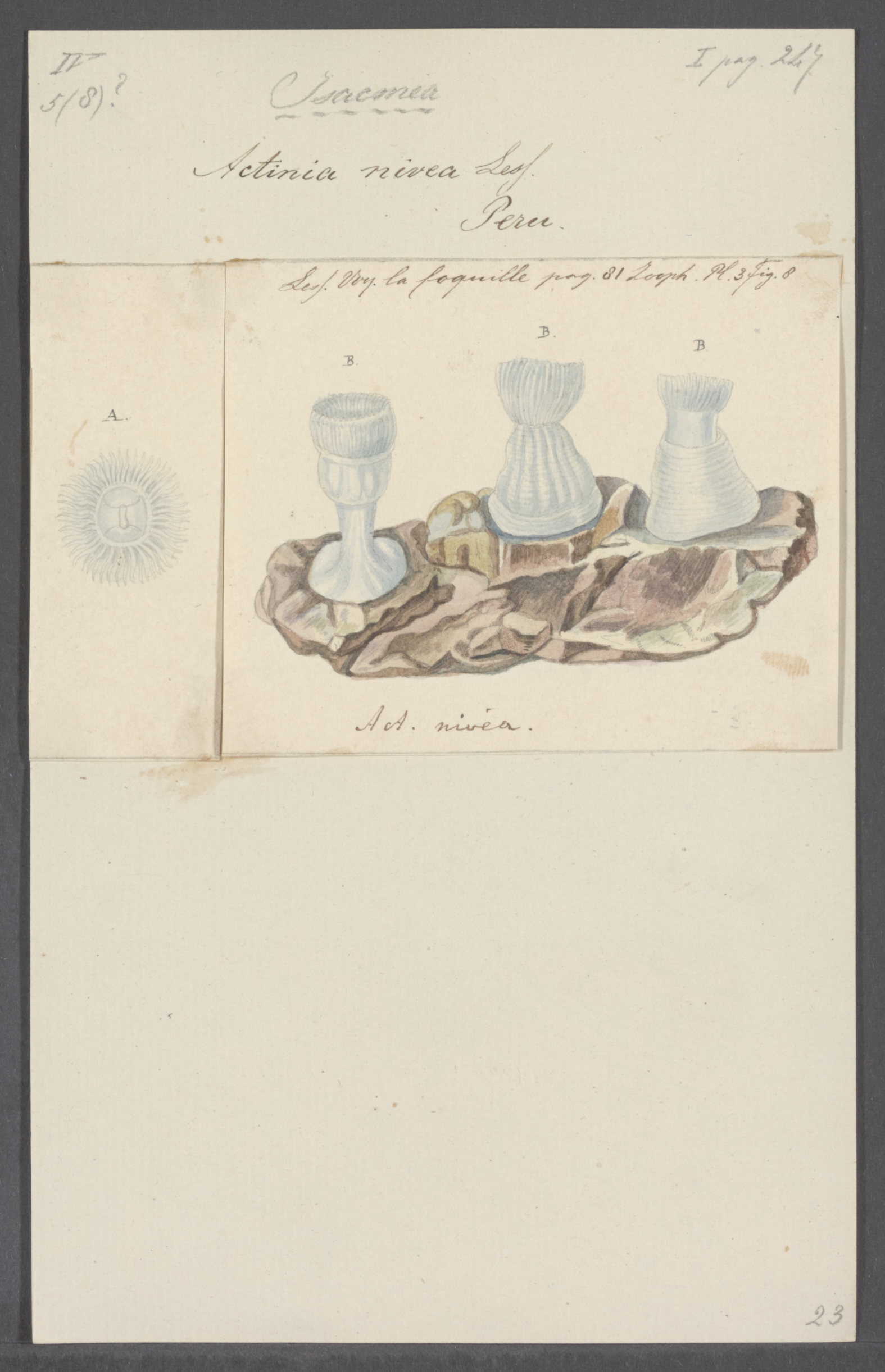
- Paranthus niveus

Scientific classification
- Kingdom: Animalia
- Phylum: Cnidaria
- Subphylum: Anthozoa
- Class: Hexacorallia
- Order: Actiniaria
- Family: Actinostolidae
- Genus: Paranthus; Andres, 1883

Species
- see text

= Paranthus =

Genus of sea anemones

Paranthus is a genus of sea anemones in the family Actinostolidae.

== Characteristics ==
The pedal disc is not swollen. The column is long and smooth and the margin is indistinct. The sphincter is well developed and the tentacles are relatively short, the inner tentacles being longer than the outer ones.

== Species ==
The following species are recognised by the World Register of Marine Species:

- Paranthus chromatoderus (Schmarda, 1852)
- Paranthus crassus (Carlgren, 1899)
- Paranthus ignotus (McMurrich, 1904)
- Paranthus niveus (Lesson, 1830)
- Paranthus rapiformis (Le Sueur, 1817)
- Paranthus rhodora (Couthouy in Dana, 1846)
- Paranthus sociatus Uchida, 1940
