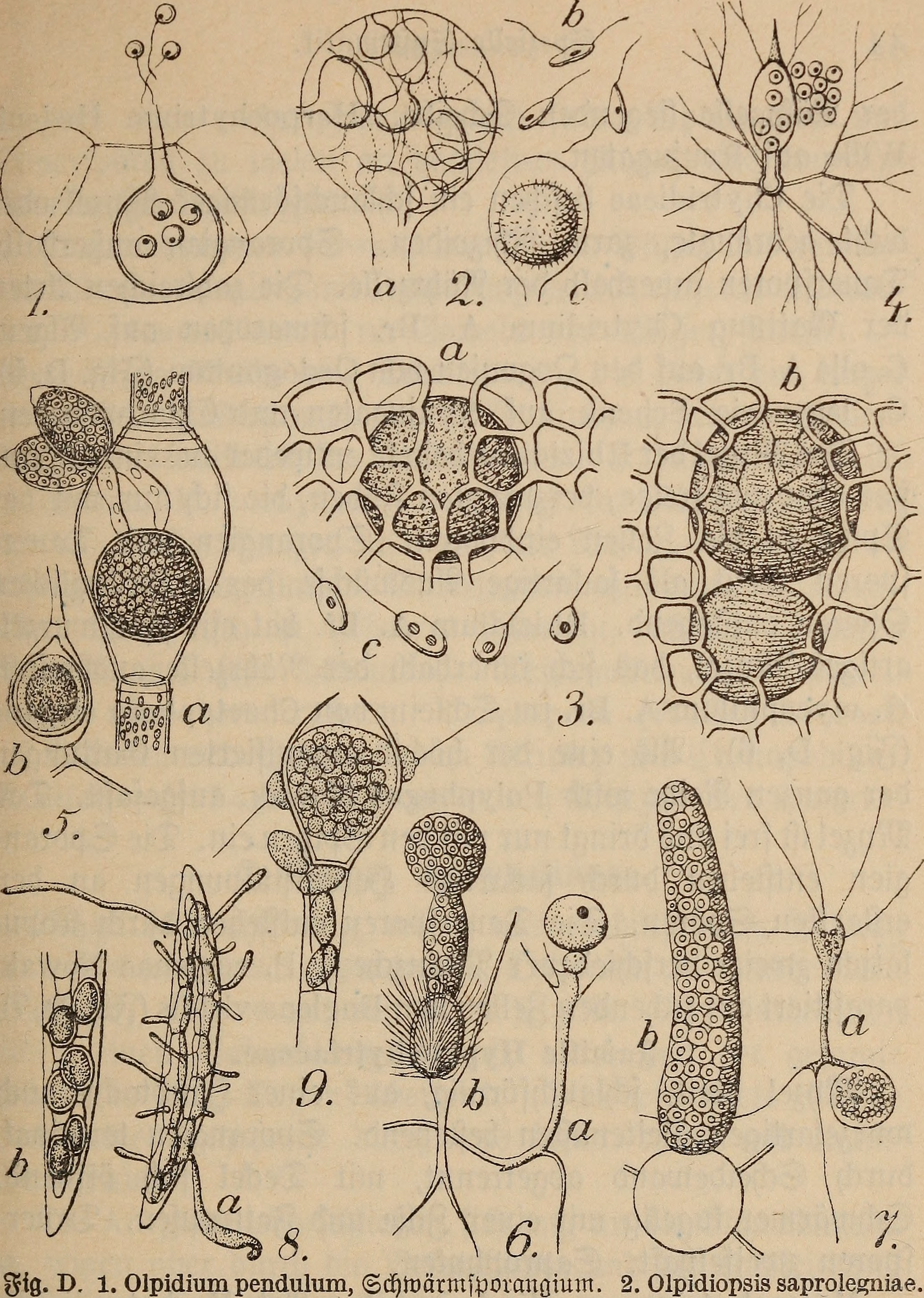
- Chytridium olla

Scientific classification
- Domain: Eukaryota
- Kingdom: Fungi
- Division: Chytridiomycota
- Class: Chytridiomycetes
- Order: Chytridiales
- Family: Chytridiaceae
- Genus: Chytridium; A.Braun, 1851

Species
- Many, including: Chytridium acuminatum; Chytridium confervae; Chytridium elegans; Chytridium olla

= Chytridium =

Genus of fungi

Chytridium is a genus of fungi in the family Chytridiaceae.

With the culture and characterization of Chytridium olla, the type species of the order, the limits of the Chytridiales were established.

Names brought to synonymy

- Chytridium (Olpidium) Braun 1856, a synonym for Olpidium
