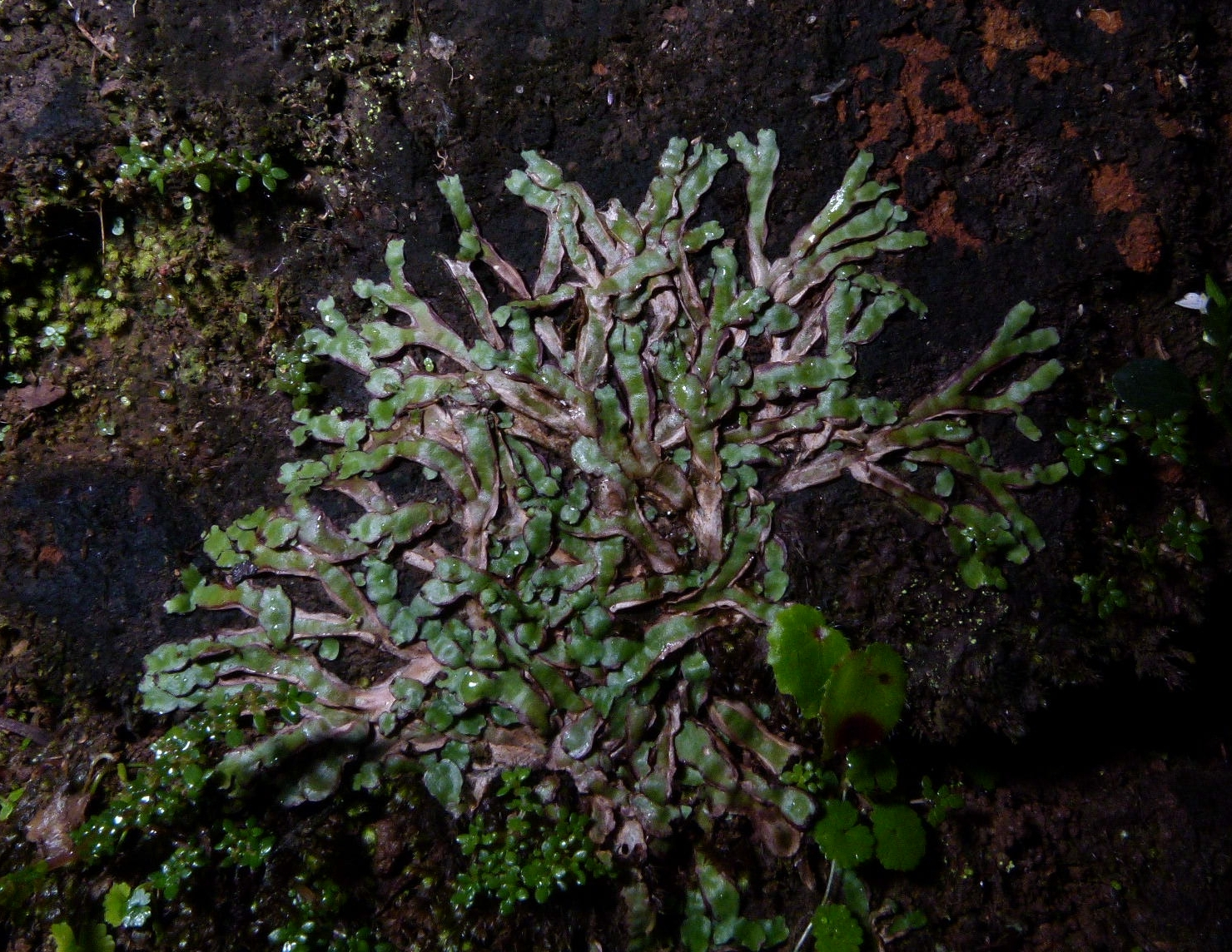
- Asterella wallichiana

Scientific classification
- Kingdom: Plantae
- Division: Marchantiophyta
- Class: Marchantiopsida
- Order: Marchantiales
- Family: Aytoniaceae
- Genus: Asterella; P.Beauv.

Species
- See text

= Asterella =

Genus of liverworts

Asterella is a liverwort genus in the family Aytoniaceae. Asterella species are commonly known as starworts.

== Species ==
A partial list of species includes:

- Asterella australis (Hook.f. & Taylor) Verd. ex G.A.M.Scott & J.A.Bradshaw
- Asterella bolanderi, the Bolander's asterella
- Asterella californica, the California asterella
- Asterella conocephala (Steph.) R.M.Schust.
- Asterella dioica (Steph.) H.A.Mill.
- Asterella drummondii (Hook.f. & Taylor) R.M.Schust. ex D.G.Long
- Asterella elegans, the elegant asterella
- Asterella gracilis, the graceful asterella
- Asterella lindenbergiana, the Lindenberg's asterella
- Asterella muelleri (Gottsche ex Steph.) R.M.Schust.
- Asterella palmeri, the Palmer's asterella
- Asterella saccata
- Asterella setisquama (Steph.) R.M.Schust.
- Asterella subplana (Steph.) R.M.Schust.
- Asterella tasmanica (Steph.) R.M.Schust.
- Asterella tenella (L.) P.Beauv.
- Asterella tenera (Mitt.) R.M.Schust.
- Asterella tenerrima (Steph.) H.A.Mill.
- Asterella whiteleggeana (Steph.) R.M.Schust.
