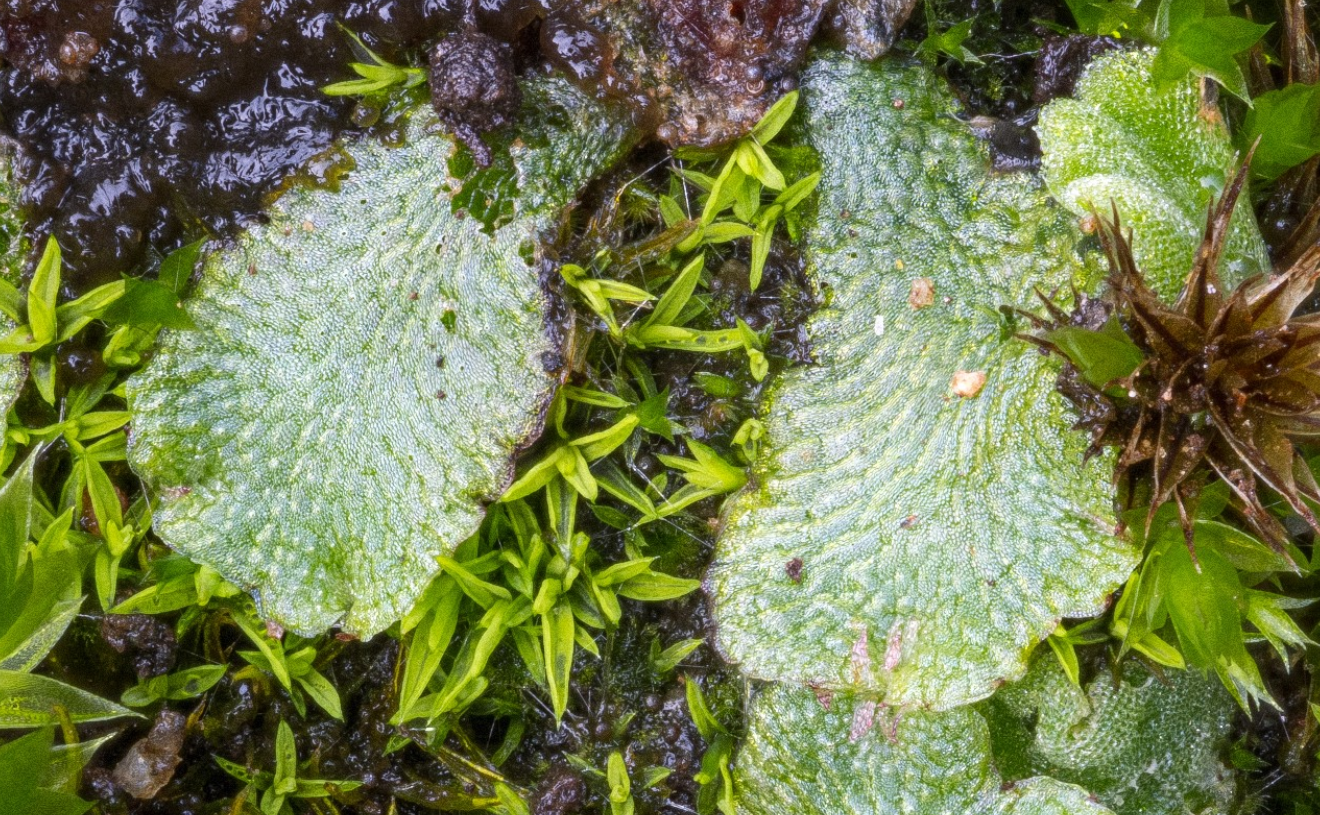

Scientific classification
- Kingdom: Plantae
- Division: Marchantiophyta
- Class: Marchantiopsida
- Order: Marchantiales
- Family: Aytoniaceae
- Genus: Asterella
- Species: A. gracilis

Binomial name
- Asterella gracilis (F. Weber) Underw.

= Asterella gracilis =

Species of plant

Asterella gracilis is a thallose liverwort in the family Aytoniaceae.

== Description ==
Asterella gracilis has a rigid, dark or light green thallose gametophyte, which can be purple-ish on the margins. The gametophyte is typically 1-2cm long and forked, with the lobes being equal to or less than 1cm long. The upper surface is somewhat bulging, with complex pores and one layer of elongated air chambers; the thallus is thicker in the center. The abaxial surface is purple-ish to black, with scales forming a row on either side of the thickened center. The thickened portion of the thallus has numerous pegged rhizoids. Paroicous, meaning the male and female reproductive organs are beside or near to each other. The archegonial receptacle stalk is around 3cm tall and arises in a notch at the thallus apex; the receptacle is "hemispherical to conic, green to purplish tinged, 3-4 lobed, with conspicuous white membranaceous long-lanceolate pseudoperianth divisions surrounding each hemispherical blade sporangium that opens by an operculum." There are currently no similar species.

== Distribution and habitat ==
Asterella gracilis is found in Europe, western North America, Alaska, Alberta, BC, Montana, Oregon, Mexico and South America. It is typically found on calcareous substrata, usually on soil found on rock, close to sea level as well as in alpine and subalpine sites.
