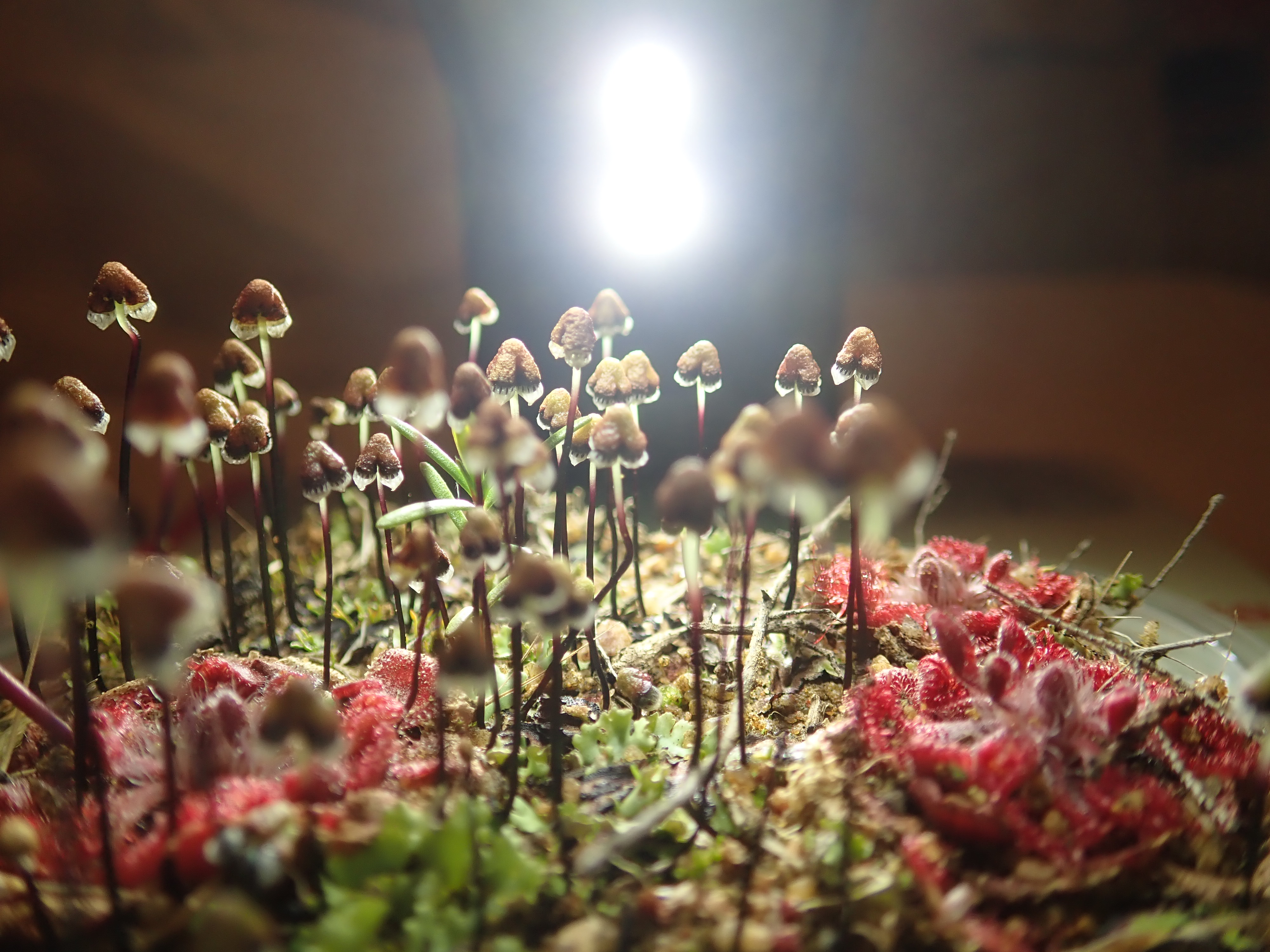

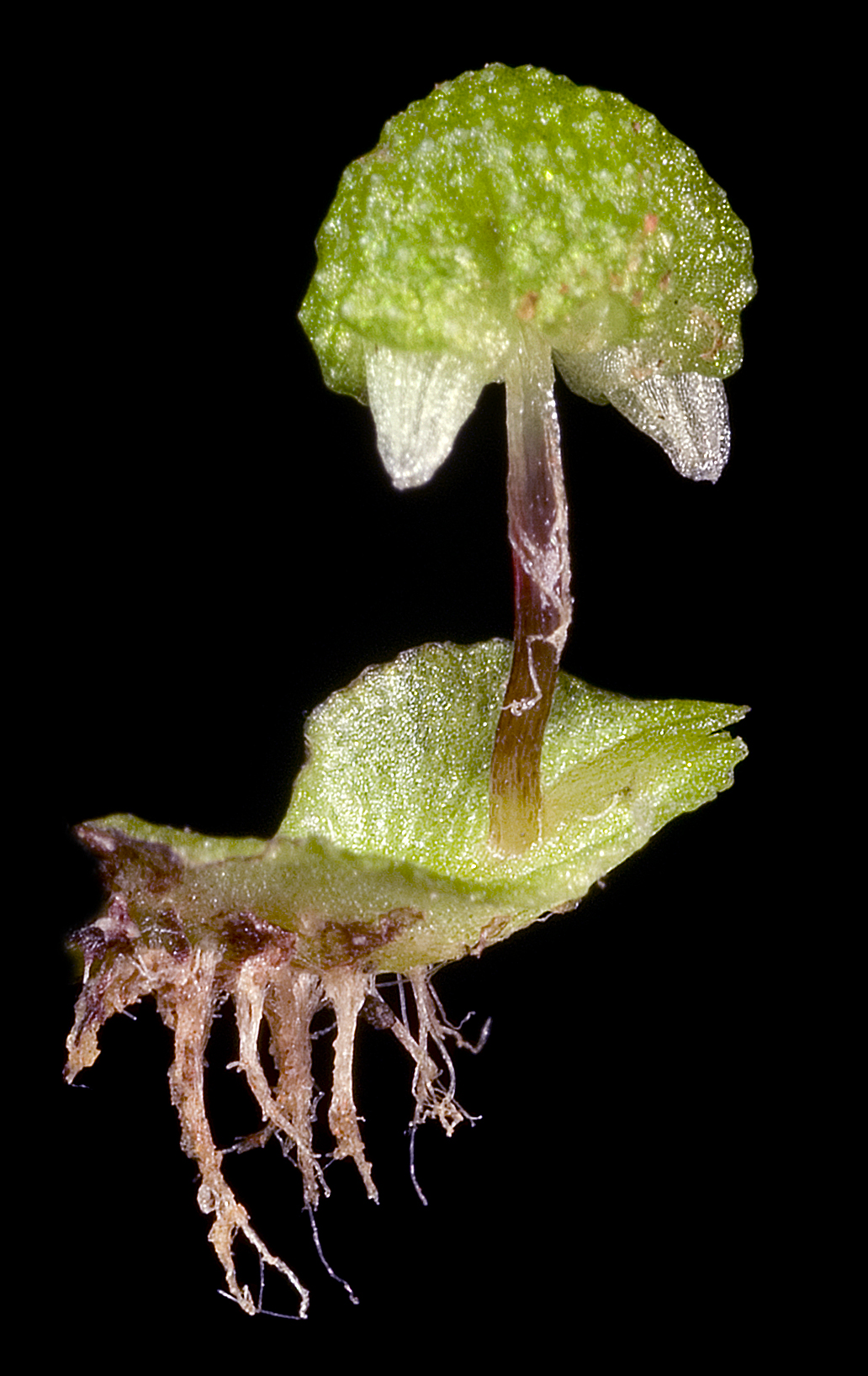

Conservation status
- Least Concern (NCA)

Scientific classification
- Kingdom: Plantae
- Division: Marchantiophyta
- Class: Marchantiopsida
- Order: Marchantiales
- Family: Aytoniaceae
- Genus: Asterella
- Species: A. drummondii

Binomial name
- Asterella drummondii (Taylor) R.M.Schust. ex D.G.Long

= Asterella drummondii =

Species of plant

Asterella drummondii is a liverwort in the family Aytoniaceae, which was first described as Fimbraria drummondii by Taylor in 1846, from material collected by Ronald Gunn in Tasmania, and James Drummond (for whom it is named) in Western Australia from the Swan River. It is found in all states of Australia, in semi-arid areas.

== Description ==
Asterella drummondii is a liverwort occurring on soil crusts or organic material in both wet and dry habitats. The thallus usually has a single tongue-like shape but sometimes appears as a star shaped rosette with a red/black margin, making the species easily found. When the thallus is dry, it rolls up to expose dark wavy margins. The fruiting bodies occur on dark stalks on the surface of the thallus. They hang down and have a white frill on the lower edge.
