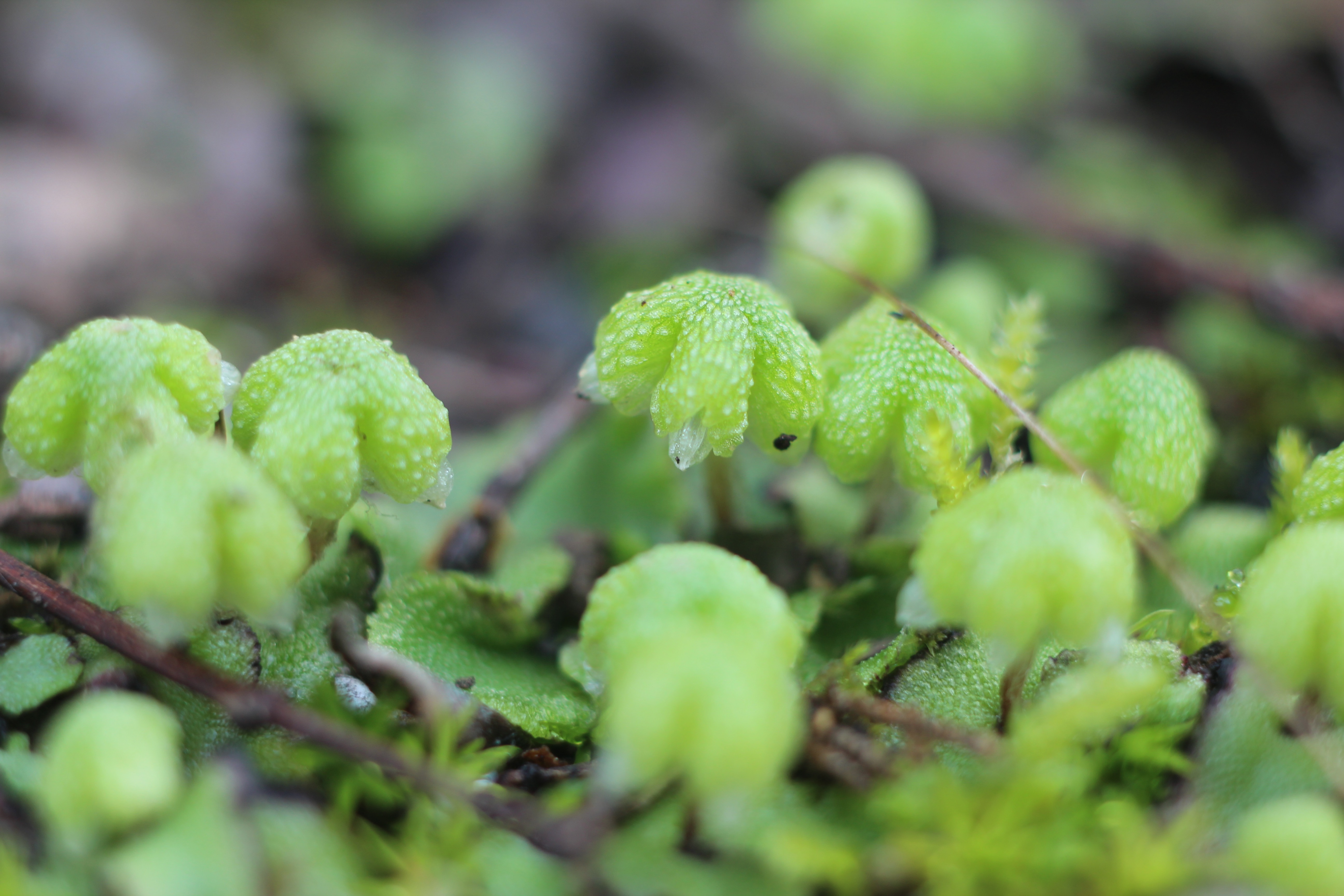
- Asterella californica female receptacles

Conservation status
- Apparently Secure (NatureServe)

Scientific classification
- Kingdom: Plantae
- Clade: Embryophytes
- Division: Marchantiophyta
- Class: Marchantiopsida
- Order: Marchantiales
- Family: Aytoniaceae
- Genus: Asterella
- Species: A. californica

Binomial name
- Asterella californica (Hampe ex Austin) Underw.

Synonyms
- Fimbriaria californica Hampe ex Austin

= Asterella californica =

Species of plant

Asterella californica is a complex thallic liverwort in the phylum Marchantiophyta. A. californica often grows as colonies of flat rosettes of light green, rigid thalli, with undersides dark wine-red to nearly black. The receptacles are rounded, with four lobes each bearing a single sporangium sheathed by a white tattered skirt. A. californica is dioecious with separate male plants often intermingled with female plants. This species is found throughout California. See Distribution information below. Asterella californica is the commonest species of the three species of Asterella occurring in California; the other two species are A. bolanderi and A. palmeri.

== Description ==
Plants are pale green dorsally with purple ascending margins and dark purple undersides, thallus edges tending to curl upward exposing the dark underside when dry. Thalli are simple or somewhat sparingly dichotomous, 8–25 mm long, usually 1-3 times dichotomous, the ultimate segments emarginated, obovate, obcordate, or broadly oblong, indistinctly areolate, 4–12 mm in maximum width. The plants dry up during the long rainless summers, but the ends of the branches remain alive, so that each growing tip becomes the beginnings of a new plant. It was found that a surprisingly large amount of the thallus remains alive, and within a few hours after the dried plants are supplied with water, the forward part of the thallus has assumed its active condition and begins to grow. In Asterella, the first antheridia were mature in about two weeks. This early development of the reproductive organs raised the question whether they might not begin their development before the close of the growing period in the spring.

== Reproduction ==
=== Male plants ===
Antheridia are clearly circumscribed, slightly elevated, strongly papillate, oval to linear-oblong, sometimes forked discs, situated in the median line of the thallus at some distance back from the apex. While working on male individuals in his laboratory George Pierce observed, then measured, antherozoids–packets of ciliated sperm cells and encasing slime–being "forceably ejected" from the thallus. One may say, then, that Asterella can throw its antherozoids, under favorable conditions, to a vertical height of 14–20 cm.

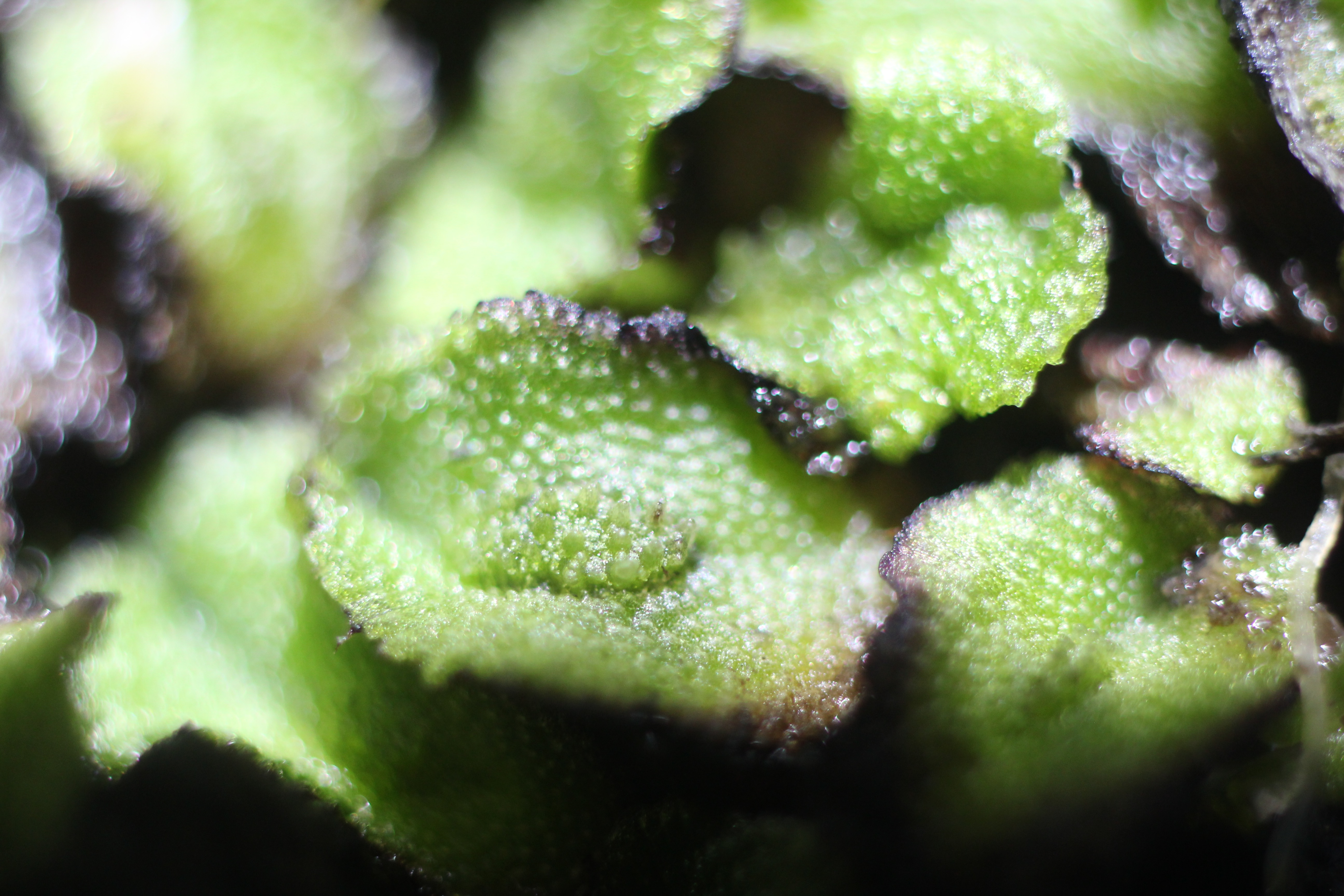
Macro image of male Asterella californica showing antheridia

=== Female plants ===
Each "umbrella", or archegoniophore, is clearly visible raised above the thallus of mature female plants is not itself a sporophyte but is in fact gametophyte tissue. The part of the "umbrella" at the top of the stem is called the female receptacle or carpocephalum. The receptacle is initially on the thallus surface and the stalk grows to raise it. The archegonia are found on the female receptacle and initially they are in the upper surface and face upward. They are fertilized when the stem is still fairly short. The stem continues to grow and the receptacle continues to grow by centrally added tissue. This moves the fertilized archegonia outward and the receptacle eventually folds over to orient the developing sporophytes so that they face down.

Peduncle straw-colored sometimes with a brown or purplish pigmentation, 1–3 cm high. Disk of receptacle green, about 5 mm across, low-hemispherical, deeply lobed, almost smooth, the lobes mostly 4 (sometimes 5).

=== Sporophyte ===
Capsule circumscissile at the middle or above by an irregular line, the operculum breaking up into fragments. Spores yellow, mostly 100 to 120 μm in diameter, with wavy wings 12-20 μm wide along the edges, the surface covered over more or less completely with a fine and often irregular reticulum with meshes 3-4 μm across. Elaters yellow variously curved, mostly 240-450 μm long and 12-16 μm wide. The yellow spores with their distinct marginal wings, fine surface reticulation, and sparesly developed ridges on the faces are also very distinctive of the species.

== Taxonomy ==
In 1810 Palisot de Beauvais established the genus Asterella, but in 1820 Nees established the genus Fimbriaria in error. The genus name Fimbriaria was used by Bolander in his catalogue of plants growing in the vicinity of San Francisco in 1870, but it is antedated by Asterella. The genus name means "little star" in reference to the star-like appearance of pores in the thallus of some species as viewed from above.

== Distribution and habitat ==
Asterella californica is widespread and common on lightly shaded slopes and banks and around rock outcrops, mostly in oak forest, chaparral on desert scrub, mostly below 3000 feet (but to 7000 feet in San Bernardino County). A. californica occurs throughout the Coast Ranges, western Klamath Ranges, Sacramento Valley, west slope of the Sierra Nevada, coastal Southern California and the Channel Islands, Transverse and Peninsular Ranges, western Colorado Desert; east to Arizona, north to southwestern Oregon, and south to northern Baja California. Growing on mineral soil or among rocks on mineral soil on open or lightly shaded banks.
