= Acrogenotheca elegans =

Scientific classification
- Kingdom: Fungi
- Division: Ascomycota
- Class: Dothideomycetes
- Genus: Acrogenotheca
- Species: A. elegans

Binomial name
- Acrogenotheca elegans (Fraser) Ciferri and Batista 1963

Synonyms
- Capnodium elegans L. R. Fraser 1935

Species of fungus

Acrogenotheca elegans is a fungus species in the genus Acrogenotheca described originally from Australia and found very commonly in New Zealand.
