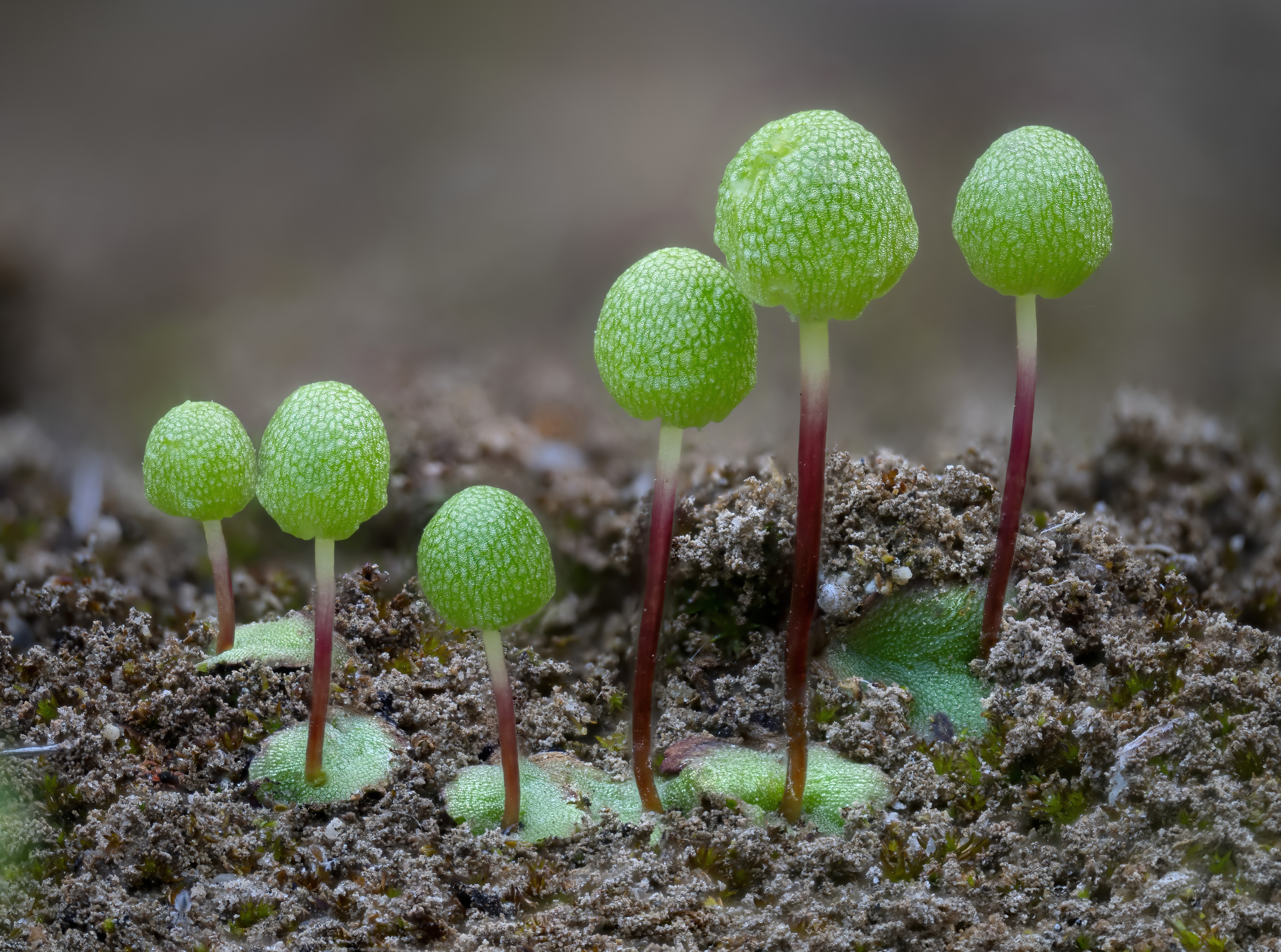
- Baja California, Mexico, 2024

Conservation status
- Vulnerable (NatureServe)

Scientific classification
- Kingdom: Plantae
- Clade: Embryophytes
- Division: Marchantiophyta
- Class: Marchantiopsida
- Order: Marchantiales
- Family: Aytoniaceae
- Genus: Asterella
- Species: A. palmeri

Binomial name
- Asterella palmeri (Austin) Underw.

Synonyms
- Fimbriaria palmeri (Austin, 1875); Fimbriaria nudata (Howe, 1893); Asterella nudata (Underw., 1895); Asterella palmeri (Underw., 1895)

= Asterella palmeri =

Species of plant

Asterella palmeri, also known as Palmer's asterella, is a species of liverwort native to southwestern North America that can be found growing between roughly 30° and 40° north latitude. The plant is found in the U.S. state of California as far north as Redding, and in the Mexican state of Baja California as far south as Punta Baja, as well as in the northwestern corner of U.S. state of New Mexico. According to California bryologists William T. Doyle and Raymond E. Stotler, Palmer's asterella is typically found around chaparral, conifers, and in oak woodland in "exposed to lightly shaded summer-dry soil; usually on gentle to steep slopes." This liverwort is usually found below 950 metres (3,120 ft) elevation, but in the southern Sierra Nevada can be found at up to 1,250 metres (4,100 ft) above sea level.

The range of A. palmeri overlaps somewhat with the range of Asterella californica. A. palmeri is morphologically most similar to A. saccata, A. muscicola and the East Asian species A. grollei.

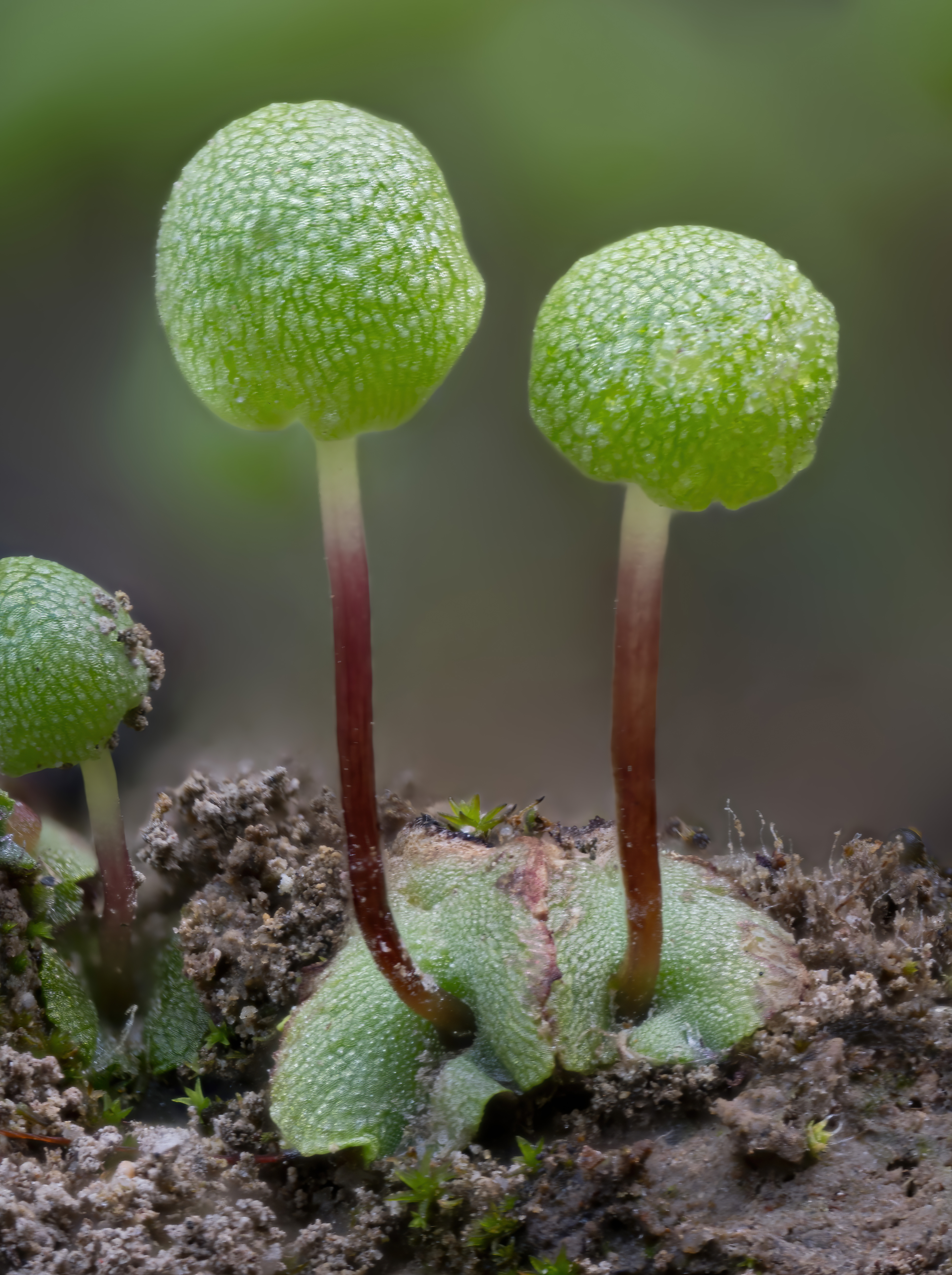
Asterella palmeri closeup

The holotype was collected by Dr. Edward Palmer on Guadalupe Island off the Pacific coast of Mexico. It was first described as Fibriaria palmeri by C. F. Austin in 1875 in the Bulletin of the Torrey Botanical Club.
