= Actinoporus elegans =

Scientific classification
- Kingdom: Animalia
- Phylum: Cnidaria
- Subphylum: Anthozoa
- Class: Hexacorallia
- Order: Actiniaria
- Family: Capneidae
- Genus: Actinoporus
- Species: A. elegans

Binomial name
- Actinoporus elegans Duchassaing, 1850

Synonyms
- Aureliana elegans Andres, 1883

Species of cnidarian

Actinoporus elegans, commonly known as the elegant anemone or the brown-striped anemone, is a species of sea anemone in the family Aurelianidae. This species may exhibit a high degree of colour variability, from blue to white to nearly transparent.

The column is smooth and textured near the top and bottom, growing to a maximum of 15 centimetres (5.9 in) in height and with a diameter of about 5 centimetres (2.0 in). The base, about the same diameter as the column, is deeply buried in the substratum. The disc is flat and also about the same diameter as the column. Although the surface of the disc is hidden by tentacles at the fringes, there is a small exposed area at the centre where the distance between them is greater. Both the base and column are mostly white with some clear areas. Near the disc, the ridges may be a translucent brown colour. This translucency is due to the thinness of the base and column walls.

The tentacles are short and wart-like, appearing almost non-existent, giving the surface of the disc a "finely beaded" appearance. They are arranged in irregular radial sections, more crowded at the margin of the disc than at the centre. The tentacles bear stinging nematocytes on the outer half of the ectoderm (outside layer). The tentacles may be opaque white or red, with spots of various colours such as yellow, brown, and pink on the tips, though white is more common at the fringe. The individual tentacles are unable to retract; however, the disc as a whole can almost be retracted totally.

A. elegans inhabits the tropical Atlantic Ocean, from the Caribbean Sea to Brazil. Although previously known only from the western Atlantic, populations were discovered in the east Atlantic at São Tomé and Príncipe in 2004 and in 2006, the first records of this species in the area.
