= Adeorbis elegans =

Scientific classification
- Kingdom: Animalia
- Phylum: Mollusca
- Class: Gastropoda
- (unranked): clade Caenogastropoda clade Hypsogastropoda clade Littorinimorpha
- Superfamily: Rissooidea
- Family: Tornidae
- Genus: Adeorbis (synonym for Tornus)
- Species: A. elegans

Binomial name
- Adeorbis elegans (A. Adams, 1850)

Synonyms
- Cyclostrema elegans A. Adams, 1850

Species of gastropod

Adeorbis elegans is a species of very small sea snail with a translucent shell, a marine gastropod mollusk in the family Tornidae.
