= Asterella elegans =

Scientific classification
- Kingdom: Plantae
- Division: Marchantiophyta
- Class: Marchantiopsida
- Order: Marchantiales
- Family: Aytoniaceae
- Genus: Asterella
- Species: A. elegans

Binomial name
- Asterella elegans (Spreng.) Trevis.

Synonyms
- Fimbraria elegans Spreng.; Fimbraria cubanensis Lehm. ex Mont.; Hypenantron elegans (Spreng.) Trevis.; Fimbraria elegans var. cubanensis (Lehm. ex Mont.) Gottsche, Lindenb. & Nees; Asterella austinii Underw.; Asterella cubanensis (Lehm. ex Mont.) Underw.; Asterella wrightii Underw.; Fimbraria austinii (Underw.) Steph.; Fimbraria wrightii (Underw.) Steph.; Asterella reticulata A.Evans; Asterella evansii Kachroo

Species of liverwort

Asterella elegans, the elegant asterella, is a species of liverwort in the family Aytoniaceae. It is found in Texas, Mexico, Guatemala and Cuba.
