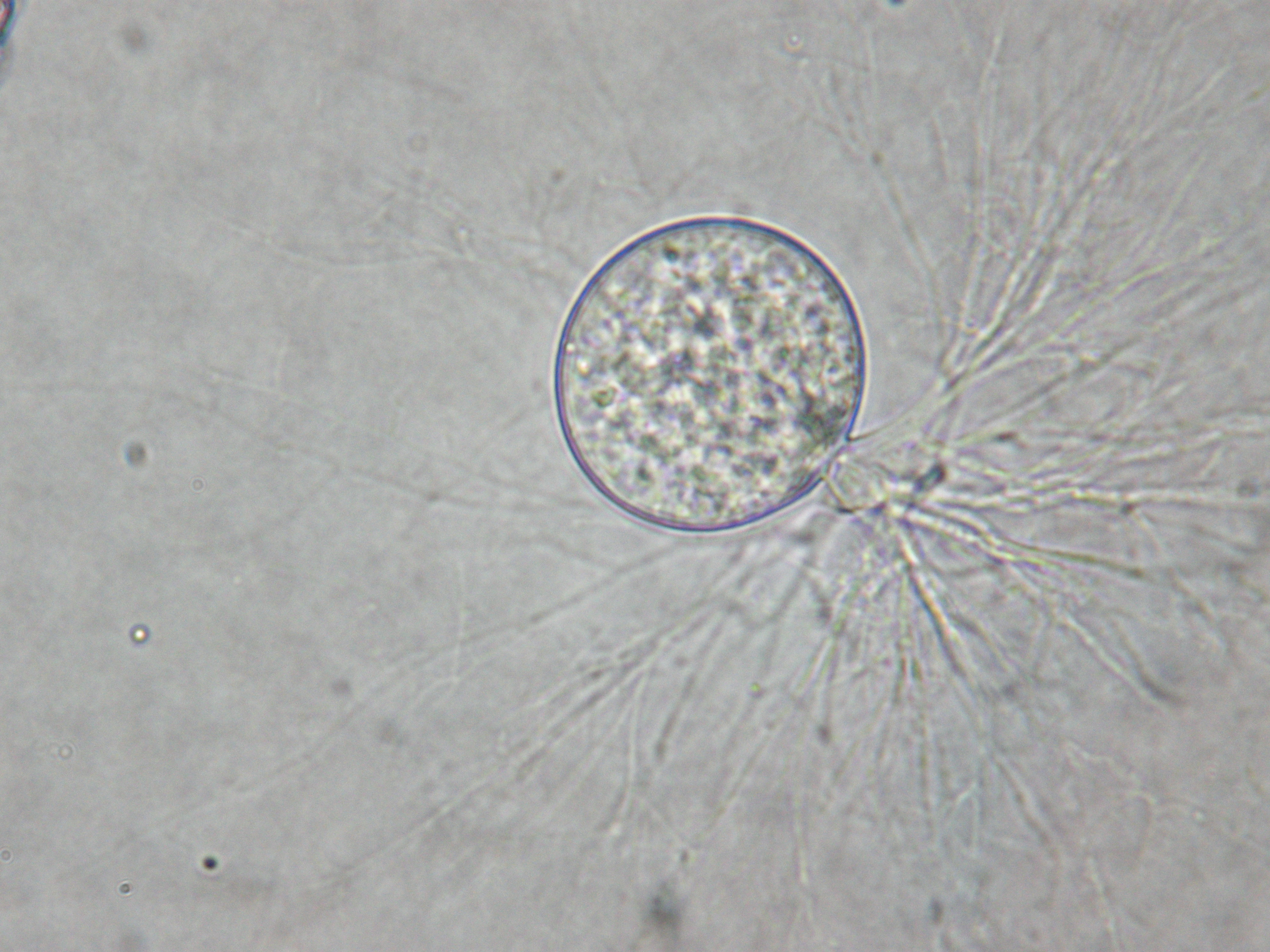
- Chytriomyces hyalinus growing on nutrient agar

Scientific classification
- Kingdom: Fungi
- Division: Chytridiomycota
- Class: Chytridiomycetes
- Order: Chytridiales
- Family: Chytriomycetaceae; Letcher (2011)

Type genus
- Chytriomyces Karling (1949)

= Chytriomycetaceae =

Family of fungi

The Chytriomycetaceae are a family of fungi in the order Chytridiales.

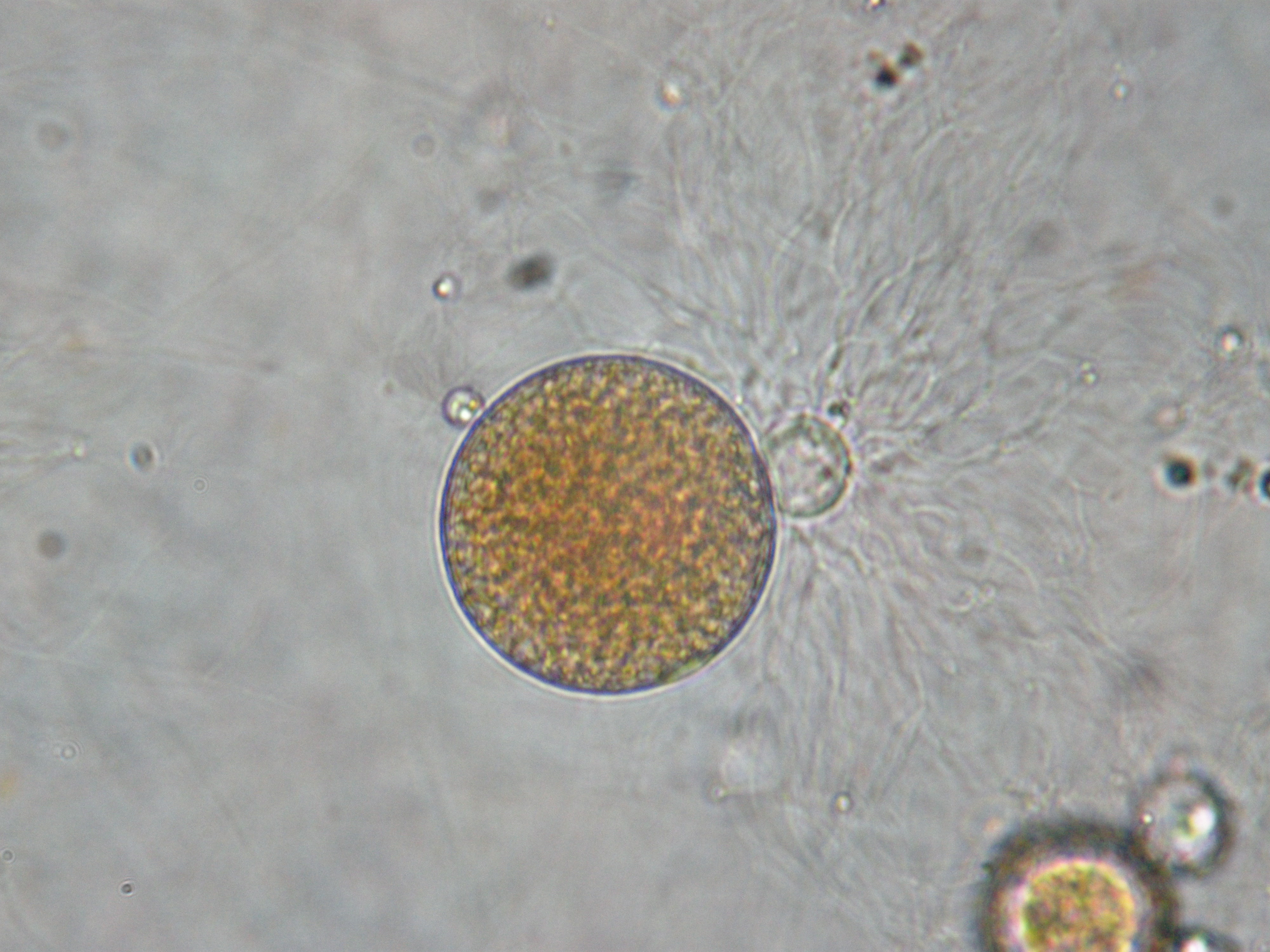
Rhizoclosmatium aurantiacum zoosporangium with characteristic orange coloration and apophysis.

== Genera ==
- Chytriomyces
- Rhizoclosmatium
- Rhizidium
- Podochytrium
- Obelidium
- Siphonaria
- Entophlyctis
- Physocladia
- Asterophlyctis
- Fayochytriomyces
- Avachytrium
- Odontochytrium
- Rodmanochytrium
