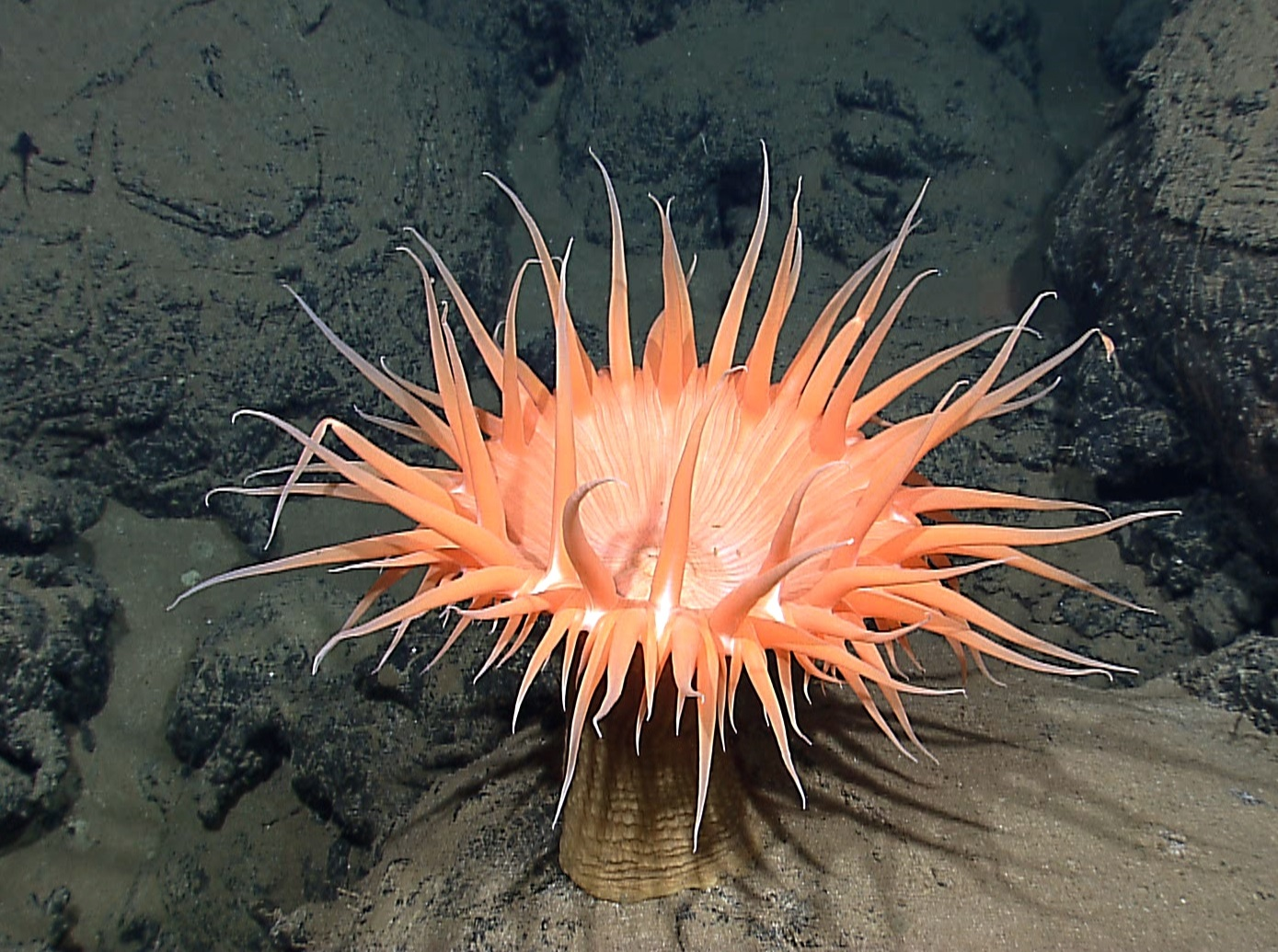
- Actinostola sp.

Scientific classification
- Domain: Eukaryota
- Kingdom: Animalia
- Phylum: Cnidaria
- Class: Hexacorallia
- Order: Actiniaria
- Family: Actinostolidae
- Genus: Actinostola; Verrill, 1883

Species
- see text

= Actinostola =

Genus of sea anemones

Actinostola is a genus of sea anemones in the order Actiniaria. All members of this genus are deep-sea species, with some occurring at hydrothermal vents.

== Species ==
The following species are recognised by the World Register of Marine Species:

- Actinostola abyssorum (Danielssen, 1890)
- Actinostola bulbosa (Carlgren, 1928)
- Actinostola callosa (Verrill, 1882)
- Actinostola capensis (Carlgren, 1928)
- Actinostola carlgreni Wassilieff, 1908
- Actinostola chilensis McMurrich, 1904
- Actinostola crassicornis (Hertwig, 1882)
- Actinostola faeculenta (McMurrich, 1893)
- Actinostola georgiana Carlgren, 1927
- Actinostola groenlandica Carlgren, 1899
- Actinostola kerguelensis Carlgren, 1928
