= Chytridiaceae =

Scientific classification
- Kingdom: Fungi
- Division: Chytridiomycota
- Class: Chytridiomycetes
- Order: Chytridiales
- Family: Chytridiaceae; Nowak. (1878)

Type genus
- Chytridium A.Braun (1851)

Family of fungi

The Chytridiaceae are a family of fungi in the order Chytridiales. The family contains 33 genera and 238 species according to a 2008 estimate.

== Genera ==
- Chytridium
- Cylindrochytrium
- Dangeardia
- Dangeardiana
- Dendrochytridium
- Irineochytrium
- Loborhiza
- Macrochytrium
- Nowakowskia
- Phlyctochytrium
- Physorhizophidium
- Polyphagus
- Polyphlyctis
- Pseudopileum
- Rhopalophlyctis
- Saccomyces
- Scherffeliomyces
- Scherffeliomycopsis
- Septosperma
- Solutoparies
- Sparrowia
- Sporophlyctidium
- Sporophlyctis
- Dinochytrium
- Zygorhizidium
- Vendomyces (?)
