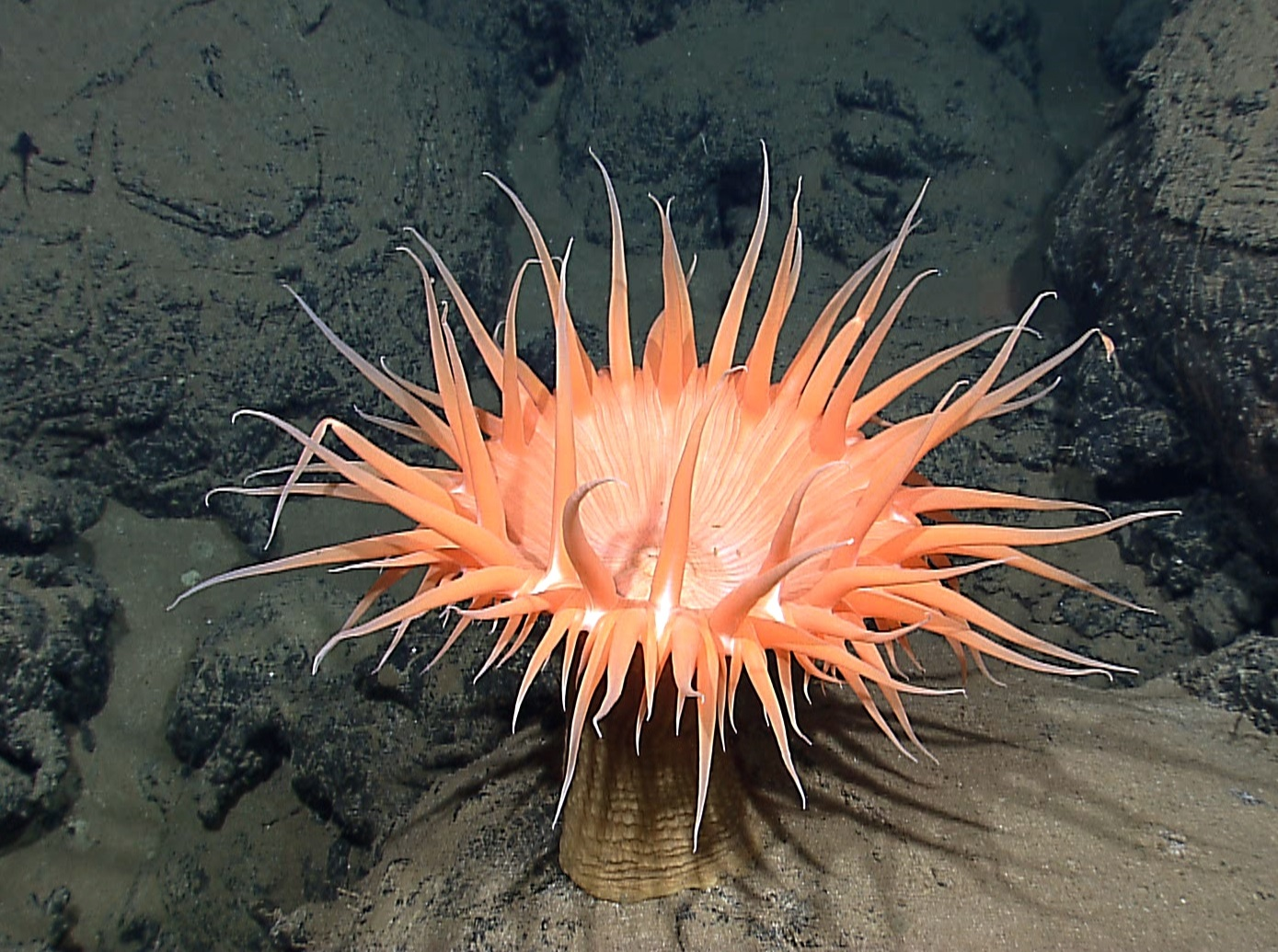
- Actinostola sp.

Scientific classification
- Kingdom: Animalia
- Phylum: Cnidaria
- Subphylum: Anthozoa
- Class: Hexacorallia
- Order: Actiniaria
- Superfamily: Actinostoloidea
- Family: Actinostolidae; Carlgren, 1932

Genera
- See text

= Actinostolidae =

Family of sea anemones

Actinostolidae is a family of sea anemones in the order Actiniaria. Members of this family are deep sea species, with some occurring at hydrothermal vents.

== Genera ==
The following genera are recognised by the World Register of Marine Species:

- Actinoloba de Blainville, 1830
- Actinostola Verrill, 1883
- Antholoba Hertwig, 1882
- Anthosactis Danielssen, 1890
- Antiparactis Verrill, 1899
- Bathydactylus Carlgren, 1928
- Cnidanthus Carlgren, 1927
- Glandulactis Riemann-Zürneck, 1978
- Hadalanthus Carlgren, 1956
- Hormosoma Stephenson, 1918
- Isoparactis Stephenson, 1920
- Ophiodiscus Hertwig, 1882
- Paranthus Andres, 1883
- Parasicyonis Carlgren, 1921
- Pseudoparactis Stephenson, 1920
- Pycnanthus McMurrich, 1893
- Sicyonis Hertwig, 1882
- Stomphia (Gosse, 1859)
- Synsicyonis Carlgren, 1921
- Tealidium Hertwig, 1882

== See also ==
- Anthosactis pearseae
