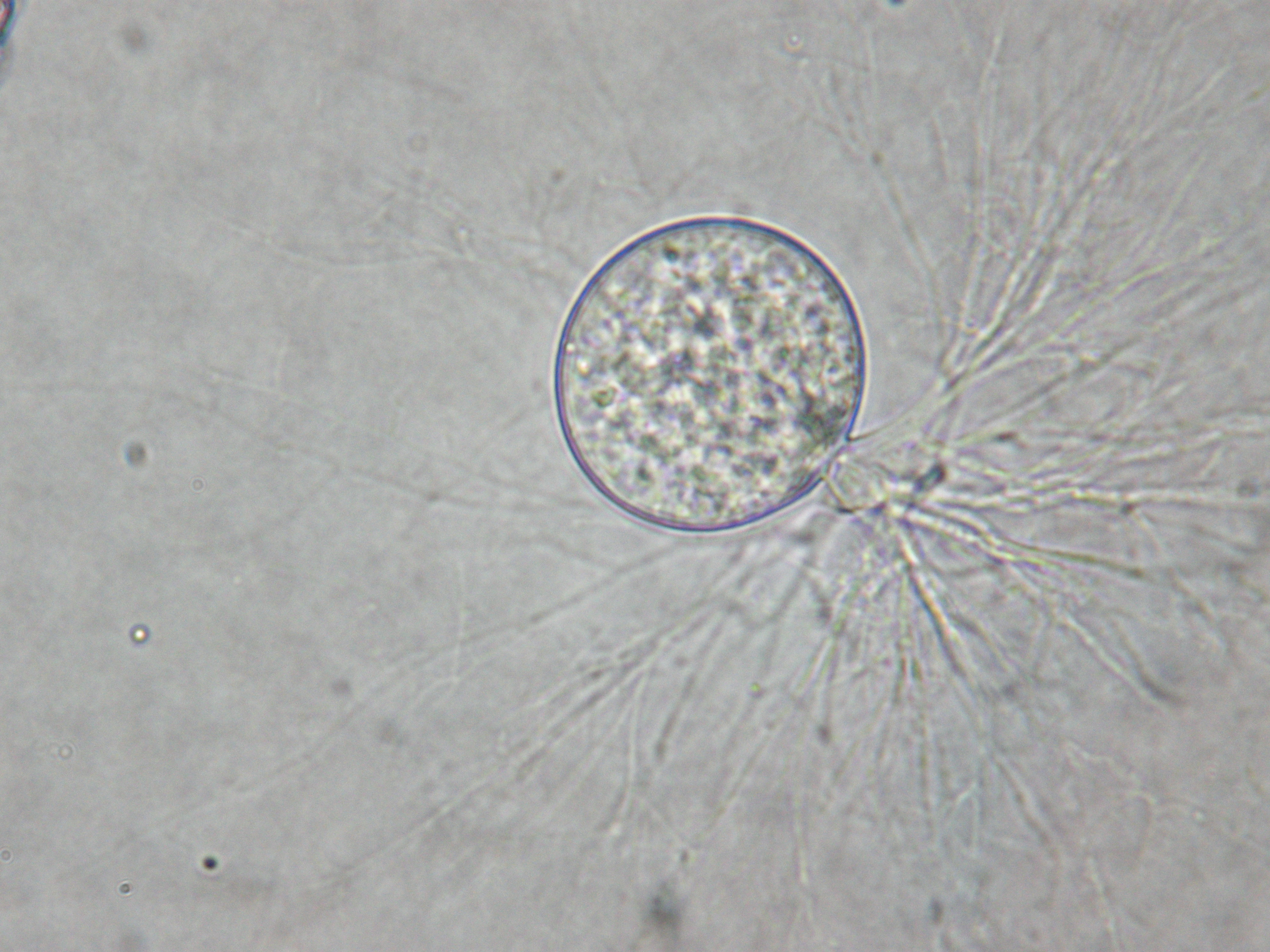
- Chytriomyces hyalinus growing on nutrient agar

Scientific classification
- Kingdom: Fungi
- Division: Chytridiomycota
- Class: Chytridiomycetes
- Order: Chytridiales; Cohn (1879)

Families
- Chytridiaceae; Chytriomycetaceae

= Chytridiales =

Order of fungi

Fungi of the order Chytridiales, like other members of its division, may either have a monocentric thallus or a polycentric rhizomycelium. When the ribosomal genes of members classified in this order were first examined using molecular techniques, it was discovered that the order contained some species that were not related. With the culture and characterization of Chytridium olla, the type species of this order, the limits of the Chytridiales were established. The Chytridiales is now monophyletic and species such as Polychytrium aggregatum, Chytriomyces angularis and Cladochytrium replicatum have been transferred to other orders.

== Genera incertae sedis ==
- Achlyella
- Achlyogeton
- Coralliochytrium
- Delfinachytrium
- Pseudorhizidium
- Dermomycoides
- Dictyomorpha
- Ichthyochytrium
- Mucophilus
- Myiophagus
- Plasmophagus
- Rhizidiocystis
- Rhizosiphon
- Sagittospora
- Septolpidium
- Sorokinocystis - Sorokinocystis mirabilis (Sorokīn) Doweld (2014)
- Trematophlyctis
