= Anemone crab =

The common name anemone crab may refer to any of the following species:

- Neopetrolisthes ohshimai, a north-west Pacific porcelain crab (Porcellanidae)
- Mithraculus cinctimanus, a Caribbean spider crab (Majidae)
- Lybia spp.
