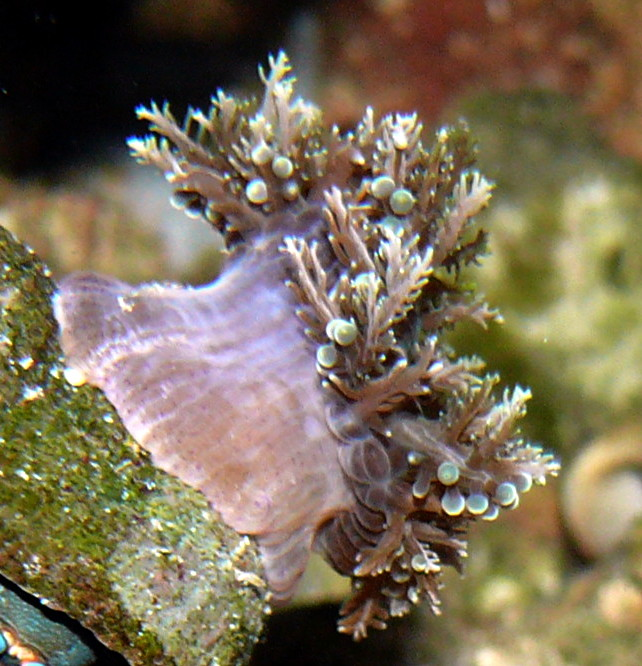

Conservation status
- Data Deficient (IUCN 3.1)

Scientific classification
- Domain: Eukaryota
- Kingdom: Animalia
- Phylum: Cnidaria
- Subphylum: Anthozoa
- Class: Hexacorallia
- Order: Actiniaria
- Family: Thalassianthidae
- Genus: Thalassianthus
- Species: T. aster

Binomial name
- Thalassianthus aster Rüppell & Leuckart, 1828

Synonyms
- Epicladia quadrangula Hemprich & Ehrenberg in Ehrenberg, 1834; Thalassianthes aster Rüppell; Thallasianthus aster

= Thalassianthus aster =

Species of sea anemone

Thalassianthus aster is a species of sea anemone in the family Thalassianthidae. It dwells in a number of habitats, even existing symbiotically on top of other motile invertebrates such as hermit crabs in a relationship similar to the pom pom crab. Its nematocysts contain a Type-II Na+-channel toxin known as δ-TLTX-Ta1a according to the currently developing systematic nomenclature for peptide and protein toxins from sea anemones.

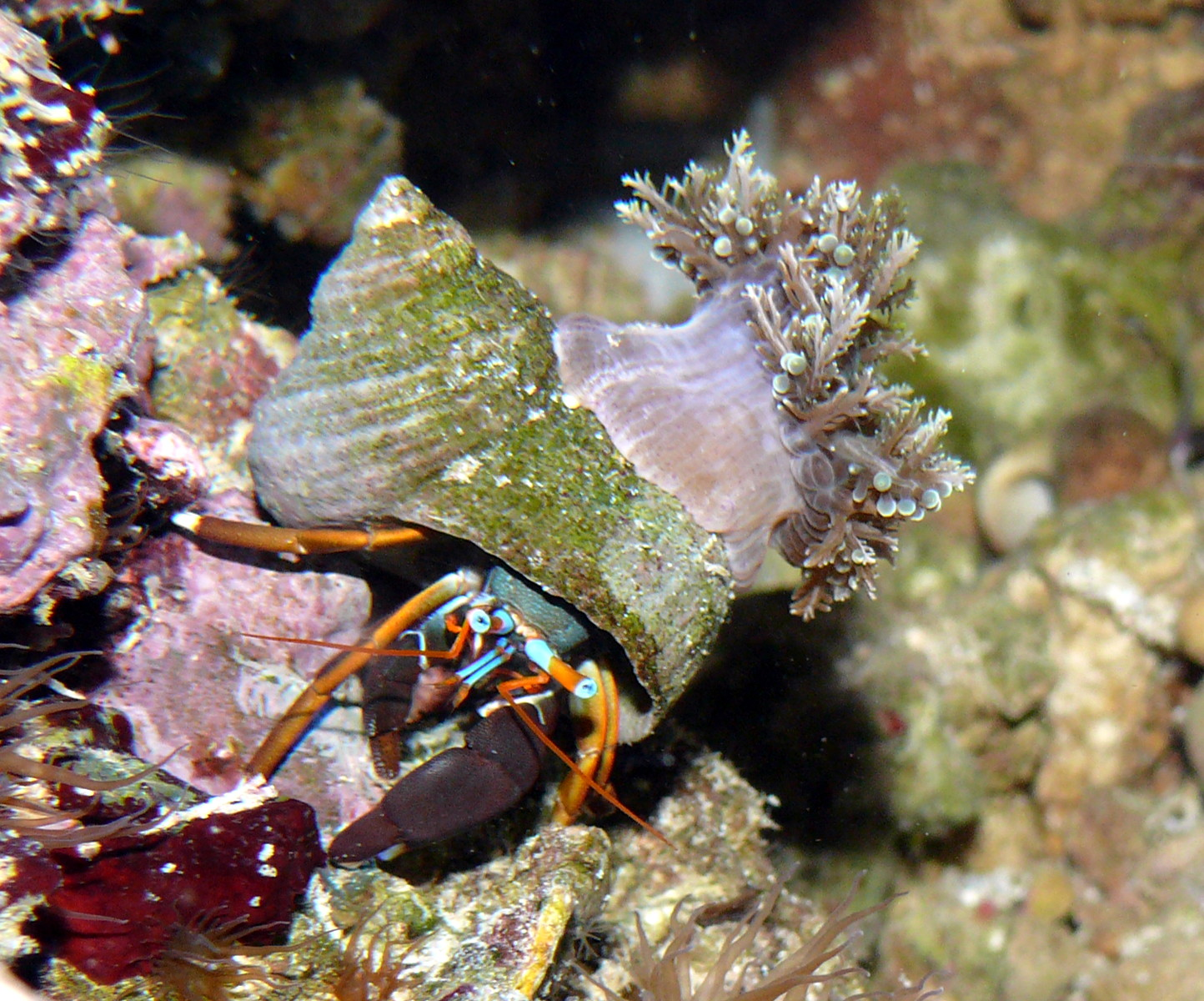
On a hermit crab

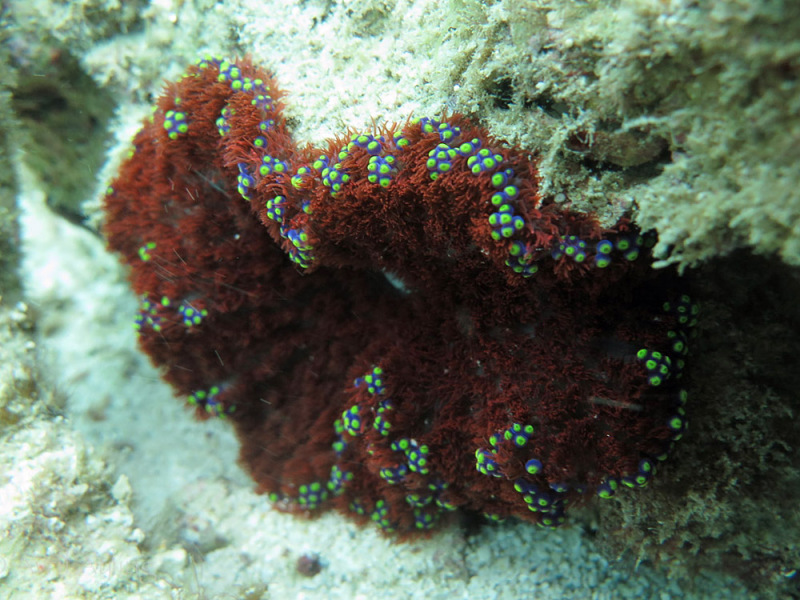
Red color morph

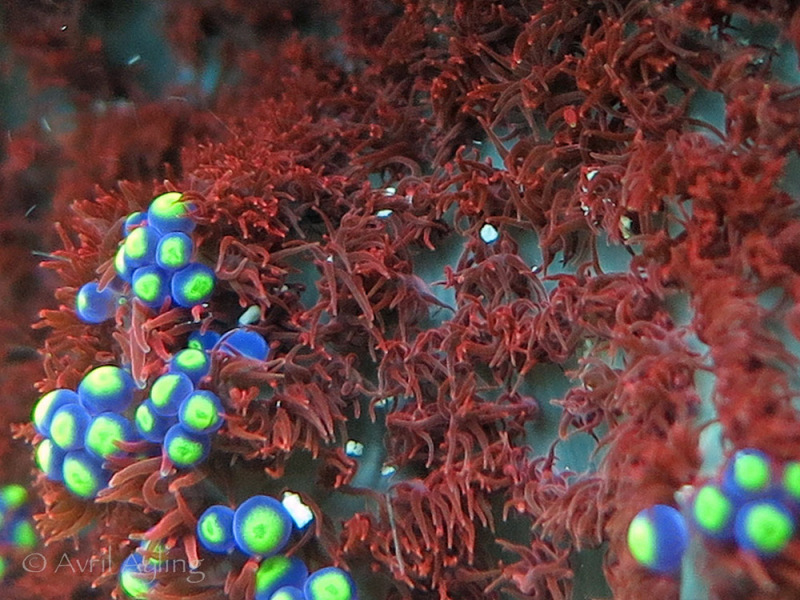
Stinging nematocysts
