= Lebrunia =

Lebrunia may refer to:

- Lebrunia (cnidarian), a genus of sea anemones
- Lebrunia (plant), a monotypic plant genus comprising the species Lebrunia bushaie
