= L. australiensis =

L. australiensis may refer to:

- Ligia australiensis, the Australian marine slater, a species of woodlouse in the family Ligiidae
- Lithodes australiensis, a species of king crab
- Lybia australiensis, a species of crab in the family Xanthidae
