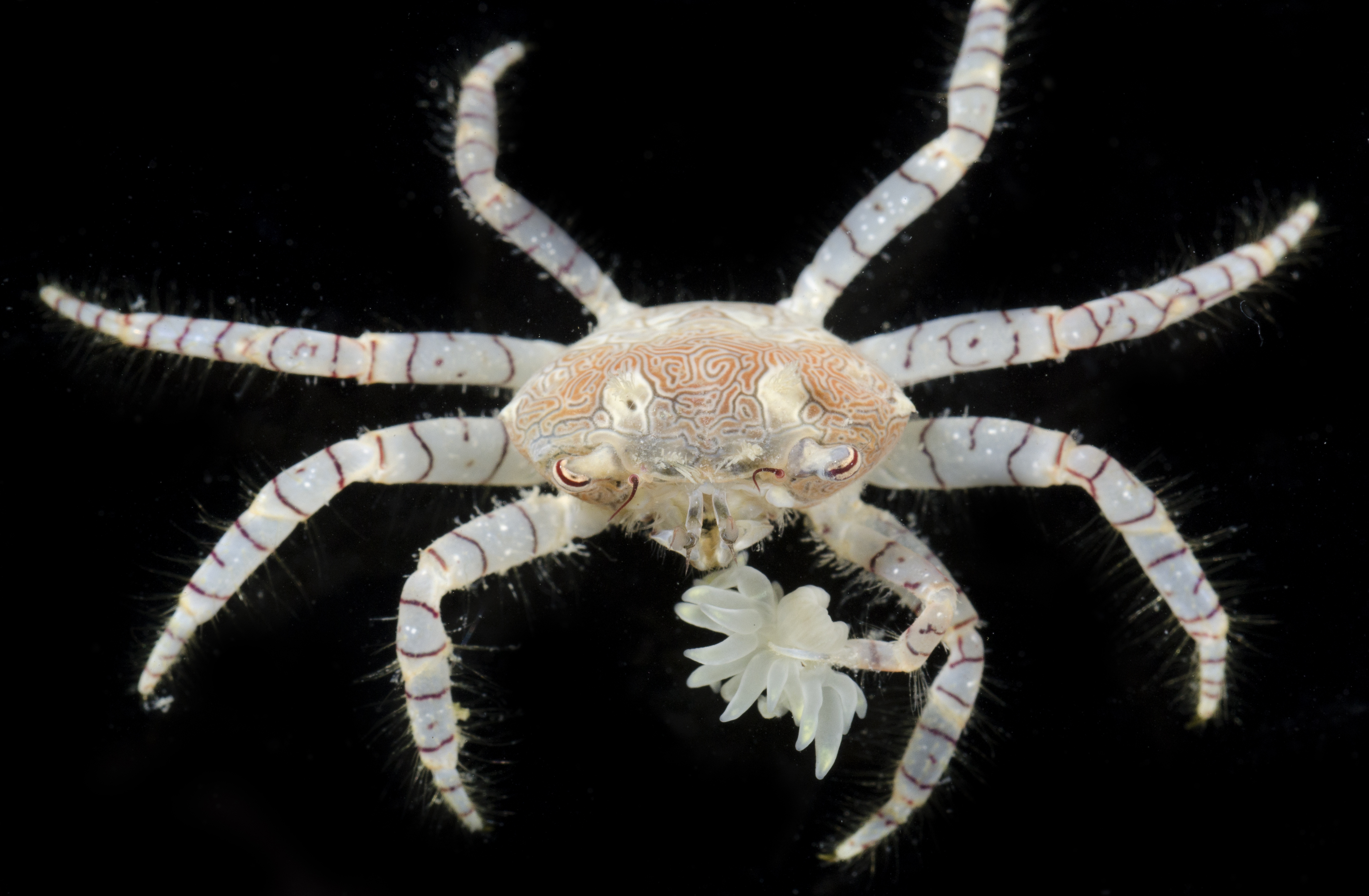

Scientific classification
- Kingdom: Animalia
- Phylum: Arthropoda
- Clade: Pancrustacea
- Class: Malacostraca
- Order: Decapoda
- Suborder: Pleocyemata
- Infraorder: Brachyura
- Family: Xanthidae
- Genus: Lybia
- Species: L. edmondsoni

Binomial name
- Lybia edmondsoni Takeda & Miyake, 1970

= Lybia edmondsoni =

Species of crab

Lybia edmondsoni is a species of small crab in the family Xanthidae and is endemic to the Hawaiian Islands. Like other members of the genus Lybia, it is commonly known as the pom-pom crab or boxer crab because of its habit of carrying a sea anemone around in each of its claws, these resembling pom-poms or boxing gloves. Its Hawaiian name is kūmimi pua, meaning "inedible flower crab". In ancient times, this animal was used by men claiming to be sorcerers.

== Description ==
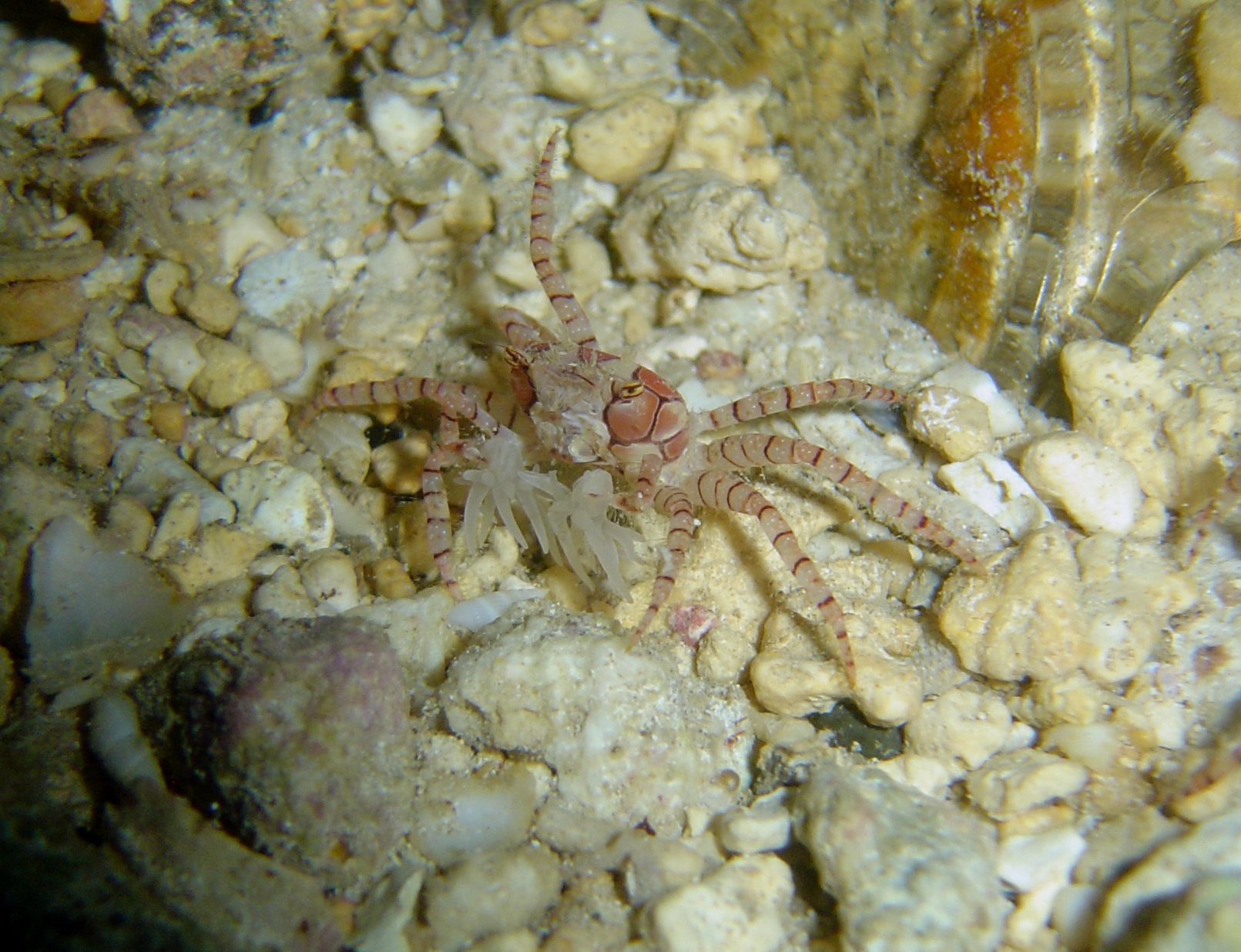
L. edmondsoni blending in with its surroundings.

The carapace of L. edmondsoni can reach 0.5 inches (13 mm) in width. It sports unusual polygonal patterns in pink, brown or yellow. The chelipeds are not heavily armoured as in most crab species but are fine and delicate, the propodal-carpal joint being very flexible, and there are several backward-pointing spines. The walking legs are banded in dark purple. On its favorite substrates, such as thin sand or rubble, the crab is almost invisible.

The common name "pom-pom crab" comes from its symbiotic practice of brandishing a stinging sea anemone (usually Triactis producta) in each claw to defend against predators and possibly to stun prey. Its alternative common name, "boxer crab", comes from its pugnacious response to threats.

== Distribution and habitat ==
Lybia edmondsoni is endemic to Hawaii but is very similar in its size and behavior to its sister species, L. tessellata, which is much more widespread in the tropical Indo-Pacific. L. edmondsoni is found in shallow water, down to a depth of about 20 m (66 ft), and hides under rocks or among coral debris. It is also found on sandy and gravelly flats, where it is well camouflaged, and on live corals where it clings with its long, slender legs.

== Biology ==
Lybia edmondsoni has relatively unarmoured chelae and is neither able to defend itself well nor feed itself efficiently as do other crabs. The sea anemones it holds are grasped delicately with its chelae and are then held in place by several small spines. The anemones are used defensively and also gather food particles with their tentacles which the crab scrapes off for its own use. The crabs often molt at night, and by the morning, although their shell is not yet fully hardened, they have already grasped hold of their anemones.

The sea anemone T. producta can undergo asexual reproduction by fission. In the research study mentioned below, two crabs that only had one anemone each when caught, and two others that each had one anemone removed, were all found to have a partial anemone in each claw during the course of the next few days. These went on to develop into normal individuals. One crab was observed in the process of pulling an anemone in half by holding it with both its chelae and then drawing them apart until the tissues parted.

== Behavior ==
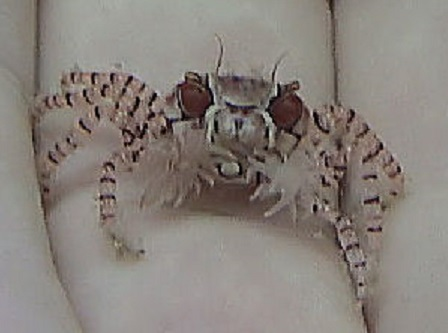
L. edmondsoni carrying two anemones.

In 1905, James Edwin Duerden made a study of the relationships between boxer crabs and their associated sea anemones, what species of anemone were selected, how they were acquired, how they were used and the feeding behavior of both anemones and crabs. His work remains the most comprehensive study of mutualism between crabs and sea anemones.

Research undertaken in 1997 by I. Karplus and others investigated how these aggressive crabs responded to other crabs of the same species in their vicinity, and whether their anemones were used as weapons in these encounters. Of the 50 crabs used in the study, 48 had two anemones each when first caught while the remaining two had just one. It was found that when two well-matched crabs met on neutral ground, much of the agonistic activity took place when the crabs were still some distance from each other, and involved threateningly extending a leg holding an anemone in the direction of the other crab. Some crabs retired from the fray at this stage but if the encounter proceeded to contact between the protagonists, the grapple was between the hindmost walking legs and the anemones were held out to the rear, well away from the contact zone. As well as aggressive moves, certain maintenance activities also took place while the crabs were close to one another. These included an individual crab rubbing its legs together or putting its mouthparts to the base of one of its anemones, but these movements also sometimes occurred when no other crab was present so were discounted as belligerent activities. Three hypotheses were put forward for the non-use of anemones during encounters:

1. T. producta is very toxic to the other crab; anemone is not used because of the possibility of self-harm.
2. T. producta is not toxic to the other crab; anemone is not used because it would be pointless to use it.
3. T. producta is such a valuable resource for the crab that it cannot be risked in such an encounter.

Although some research was done to try to find out which of these hypotheses might be correct, the results were inconclusive.

The fighting behavior between the crabs is largely ritualised with much weapon-waving but little actual contact. The anemone is obviously of great importance to the crab, but the benefits to the anemone of the relationship are less apparent. Advantages to the anemone may include being brought into contact with more food and oxygen than it would encounter if it were stationary and the avoidance of the risk of being submerged in shifting sediment.

Duerden observed in 1905 that boxer crabs missing a single anemone would tear the other in two to provide one for each claw. A 2017 study observed this behavior, along with theft of anemone fragments from other boxer crabs. Torn anemones soon grow to the size of the original, and this explains why nearly all wild boxer crabs, even those in the juvenile stage, carry two anemones.
