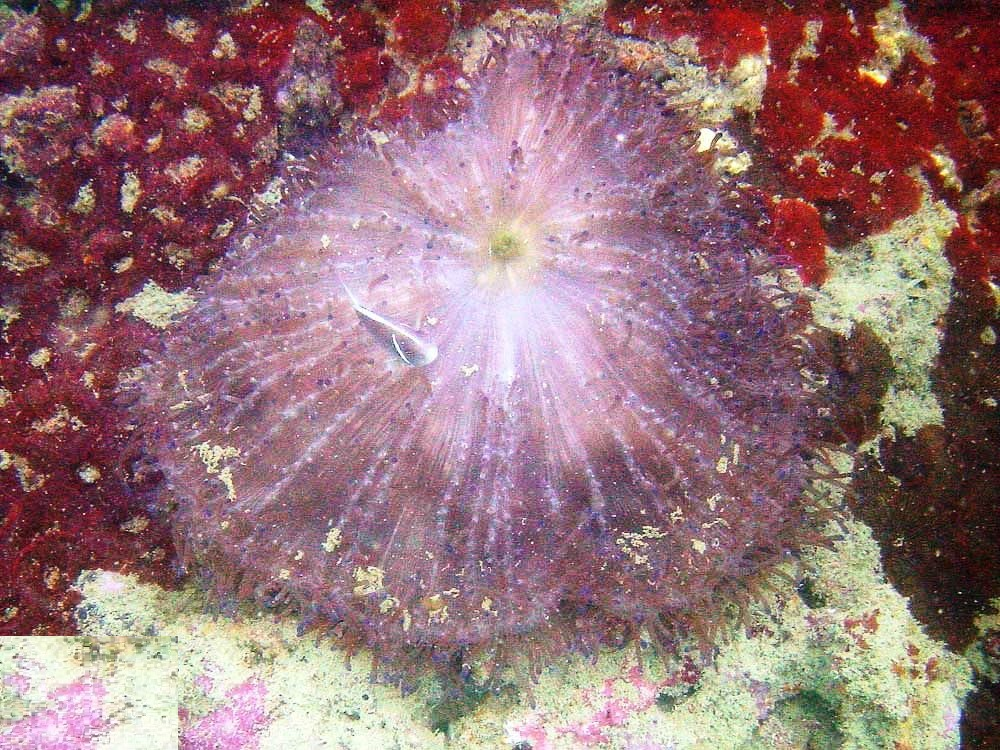

Conservation status
- Data Deficient (IUCN 3.1)

Scientific classification
- Domain: Eukaryota
- Kingdom: Animalia
- Phylum: Cnidaria
- Subphylum: Anthozoa
- Class: Hexacorallia
- Order: Actiniaria
- Family: Thalassianthidae
- Genus: Heterodactyla
- Species: H. hemprichii

Binomial name
- Heterodactyla hemprichii Ehrenberg, 1834

Synonyms
- Heterodactyla hemprichi Ehrenberg, 1834; Thalassianthus hemprichi (Ehrenberg, 1834); Thalassianthus hemprichii (Ehrenberg, 1834)

= Heterodactyla hemprichii =

Species of sea anemone

Heterodactyla hemprichii is a species of sea anemone in the family Thalassianthidae, and was first formally described in 1834 by Christian Gottfried Ehrenberg.

This sea anemone does not host any varieties of clownfish, but has been associated with some species of commensal anemone shrimp. This is a medium to large species of anemone characterized by "bunches of grape-like nematospheres," radially arranged, and densest on the outermost edges of its oral disc.
