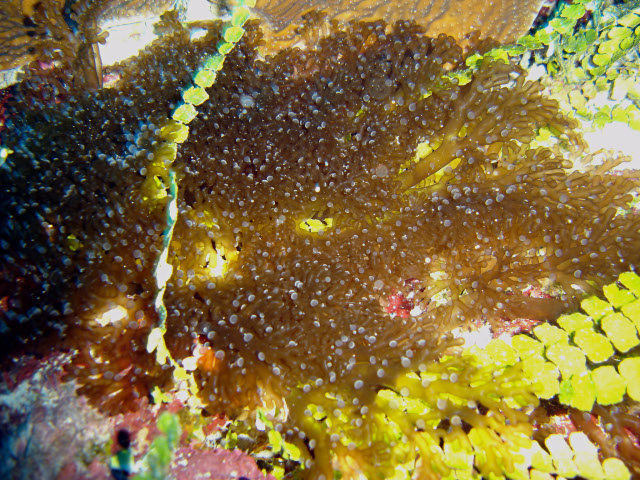

Scientific classification
- Kingdom: Animalia
- Phylum: Cnidaria
- Subphylum: Anthozoa
- Class: Hexacorallia
- Order: Actiniaria
- Family: Aliciidae
- Genus: Lebrunia
- Species: L. coralligens

Binomial name
- Lebrunia coralligens (Wilson, 1890)

Synonyms
- Hoplophoria coralligens Wilson, 1890; Lebrunea coralligens

= Lebrunia coralligens =

Species of sea anemone

Lebrunia coralligens, commonly known as the hidden anemone, is a species of sea anemone in the family Aliciidae. It is found in shallow water in the Bahamas, the Caribbean, and Brazil. It lives in fissures in corals and rocks.

== Description ==
Lebrunia coralligens has a broad basal disc and a smooth column, the upper part of which has several long outgrowths known as pseudotentacles as well as feeding tentacles on the oral disc. The pseudotentacles are photosynthetic organs; they are lobed and may branch slightly but they are much less branched than the pseudotentacles of the closely related Lebrunia danae. The tips may be darker in colour than the rest of the pseudotentacles and are slightly swollen and sometimes double-lobed, and the stalks have white rings and dark lines. The pseudotentacles are armed with small vesicles containing nematocysts and these are mostly concentrated near the tips. The colour of Lebrunia coralligens varies but the pseudotentacles are often the only parts visible and are usually tan or dark grey, or sometimes bluish-green. With the pseudotentacles extended, this species may measure 6 cm (2.4 in). The upper part of the column bears spirocysts and nematocysts (armed cells). The spirocysts are non-venomous and are used to entangle prey, while the nematocysts inject venom into it. At night the long, feeding tentacles are extended.

== Distribution and habitat ==
Lebrunia coralligens is known from the Caribbean Sea, the Bahamas and Brazil at depths down to about 10 m (33 ft). It inhabits crevices in coral heads and fissures in rocks, and often the only parts of the animal that are visible are the tips of the pseudotentacles.

== Biology ==
Sea anemones of this species have a symbiotic relationship with zooxanthellae, photosynthetic single-celled algae residing within the tissues of the host. There are between twenty and thirty times more algal cells in the pseudotentacles than there are in the true tentacles. There is a daily rhythm by which the pseudotentacles spread out to expose themselves to light by day and close up at night, at which time the feeding tentacles expand. When the anemone is in a low nutritional state, the pseudotentacles expand fully during the day, but a well-fed anemone only partially expands them. The expansion of the true tentacles is a feeding response and is increased when the animal is in a high nutritional state.

In Barbados, breeding takes place in May and June. Up to fifty planula larvae are released from an adult, each one being approximately 1 mm (0.04 in) long and half that width, with zooxanthellae already present in their tissues. The larvae usually settle on the seabed, often in groups, within 24 hours and undergo metamorphosis into juvenile sea anemones. These have eight tentacles at first but further whorls of tentacles arise as they grow. The pseudotentacles do not emerge until about six weeks after settlement.
