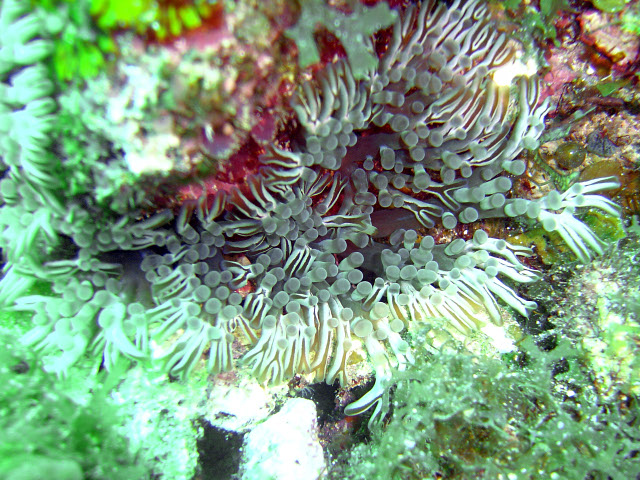

Scientific classification
- Kingdom: Animalia
- Phylum: Cnidaria
- Subphylum: Anthozoa
- Class: Hexacorallia
- Order: Actiniaria
- Family: Aliciidae
- Genus: Lebrunia
- Species: L. neglecta

Binomial name
- Lebrunia neglecta (Duchassaing & Michelotti, 1860)

Synonyms
- List: Actinodactylus neglectus Duchassaing de Fonbressin & Michelotti, 1860; Labrunia danae; Lebrunea danae; Lebrunea neglecta; Lebrunia danae (Duchassaing & Michelotti, 1860); Lubrunia danae; Oulactis danae Duchassaing de Fonbressin & Michelotti, 1860; Rhodactis danae Duchassaing & Michelotti; Rodactis danae; Stauractis incerta Andres, 1883; Taractea danae Duchassaing

= Lebrunia neglecta =

Species of sea anemone

Lebrunia neglecta is a species of sea anemone in the family Aliciidae. It is found in the Caribbean Sea and Gulf of Mexico.

== Description ==
Lebrunia neglecta is an unusual sea anemone in that its tentacles are almost hidden by the ring of six much branching large frond-like pseudotentacles that grow up from the rim of the oral disc. These are some shade of pale or darker brown and have densely branched tips. Below these, on the side of the frond are small, whitish spherical vesicles containing nematocysts that are powerful enough to sting a human. After contact with a prey item, the pseudotentacles retract and the tentacles, which are also armed with nematocysts, grasp the prey and draw it into the mouth. The column of the anemone is usually invisible, being anchored in a crevice. This species can grow to a diameter of 20 cm (8 in). It is very similar in appearance to the closely related Lebrunia coralligens, but the pseudotentacles of that species are much less branched, and often have swollen, double-lobed tips.

== Distribution ==
Lebrunia neglecta is found in Bermuda, the Bahamas, the Caribbean Sea, the Gulf of Mexico and the north coast of Brazil. It grows in reef environments at a depth of two to sixty metres (six to two hundred feet) with its column hidden in a crevice in the rock or in a massive coral head.

== Ecology ==
The tissues of Lebrunia neglecta contain the symbiotic unicellular alga Symbiodinium. This is photosynthetic and provides the anemone with energy. The pseudotentacles of Lebrunia neglecta resemble the fronds of brown seaweeds in the family Dictyotaceae in appearance and it is possible that the anemone is mimicking the harmless alga in order to lure potential prey closer. The pseudotentacles are retracted at dusk.

A number of different invertebrates live in close association with Lebrunia neglecta. These include Pederson's cleaning shrimp (Ancylomenes pedersoni), the spotted cleaner shrimp (Periclimenes yucatanicus), the shrimp Periclimenes rathbunae, the shrimp Thor amboinensis, the arrow crab Stenorhynchus seticornis, the anemone crab Mithraculus cinctimanus and a brittle star. These animals enjoy the protection provided by the anemone's nematocysts and are found either among the pseudotentacles or in their own characteristic stations close to the anemone.
