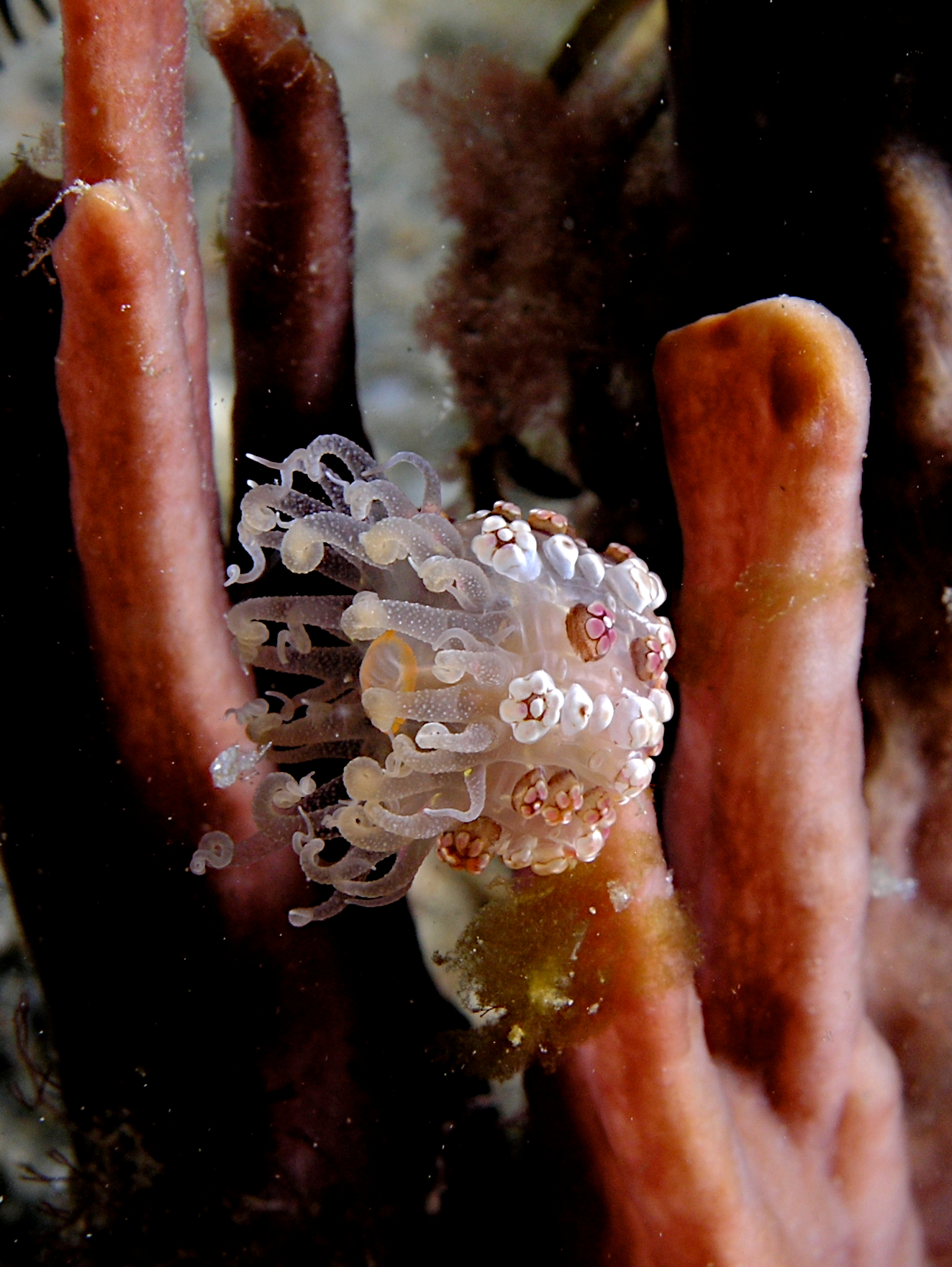
- Alicia rhadina (solitary anemone)

Scientific classification
- Kingdom: Animalia
- Phylum: Cnidaria
- Subphylum: Anthozoa
- Class: Hexacorallia
- Order: Actiniaria
- Family: Aliciidae
- Genus: Alicia
- Species: A. rhadina

Binomial name
- Alicia rhadina Haddon & Shackleton, 1893

= Alicia rhadina =

Species of sea anemone

Alicia rhadina is a species of sea anemone in the family Aliciidae. It is found in the Southern Ocean.
