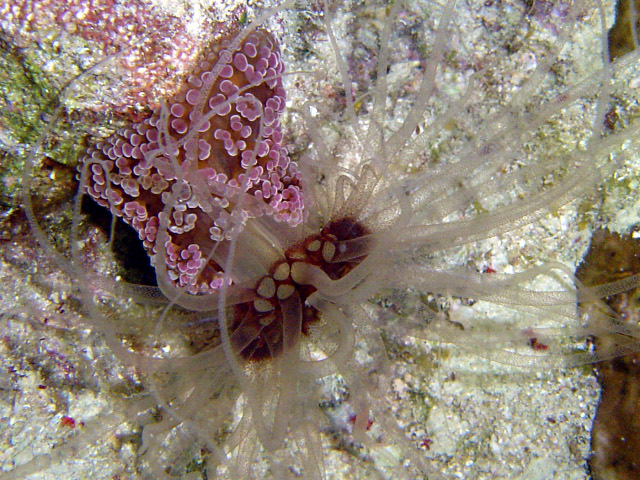

Scientific classification
- Kingdom: Animalia
- Phylum: Cnidaria
- Subphylum: Anthozoa
- Class: Hexacorallia
- Order: Actiniaria
- Family: Aliciidae
- Genus: Alicia
- Species: A. pretiosa

Binomial name
- Alicia pretiosa Dana, 1846

Synonyms
- Actinia pretiosa Dana, 1846; Cereus pretiosus

= Alicia pretiosa =

Species of sea anemone

Alicia pretiosa is a species of sea anemone in the family Aliciidae and can be found in the Red Sea and South Pacific Ocean.
