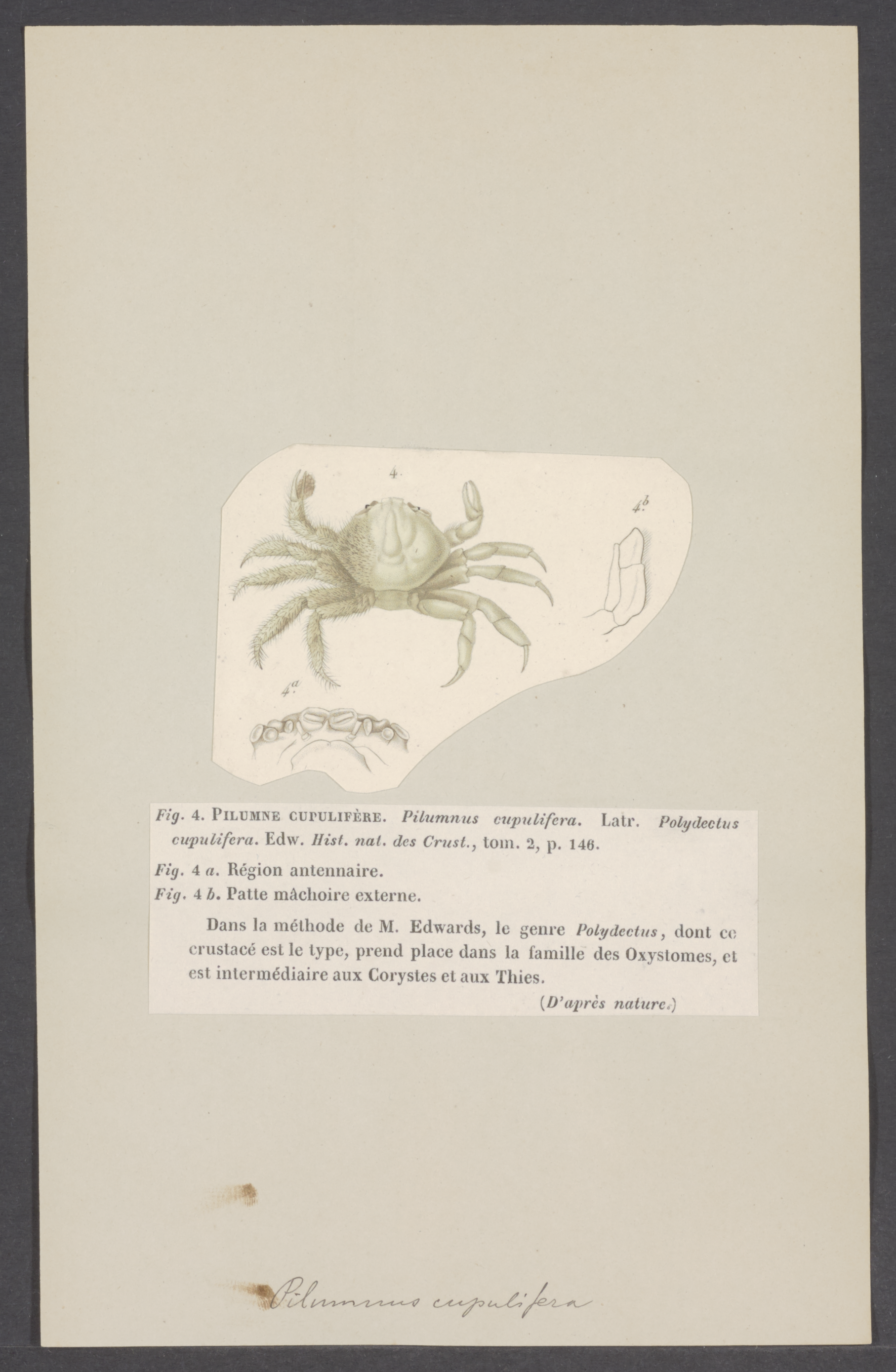
- A drawing of Pilumnus cupulifera

Scientific classification
- Kingdom: Animalia
- Phylum: Arthropoda
- Class: Malacostraca
- Order: Decapoda
- Suborder: Pleocyemata
- Infraorder: Brachyura
- Family: Xanthidae
- Genus: Polydectus
- Species: P. cupulifer

Binomial name
- Polydectus cupulifer (Latreille in Milbert, 1812)

Synonyms
- Cancer cupulifer Latreille in Milbert, 1812; Polydectus villosus Dana, 1852

= Polydectus =

Genus of crabs

Polydectus cupulifer is a species of crab in the family Xanthidae, and the only species in the genus Polydectus. Together with the genus Lybia, it forms the subfamily Polydectinae. It is found in the Indo-Pacific, ranging from Madagascar and the Red Sea in the west to Japan, Hawaii and French Polynesia in the east. P. cupulifer is densely covered with setae (bristles), and frequently carries a sea anemone in each chela (claw).
