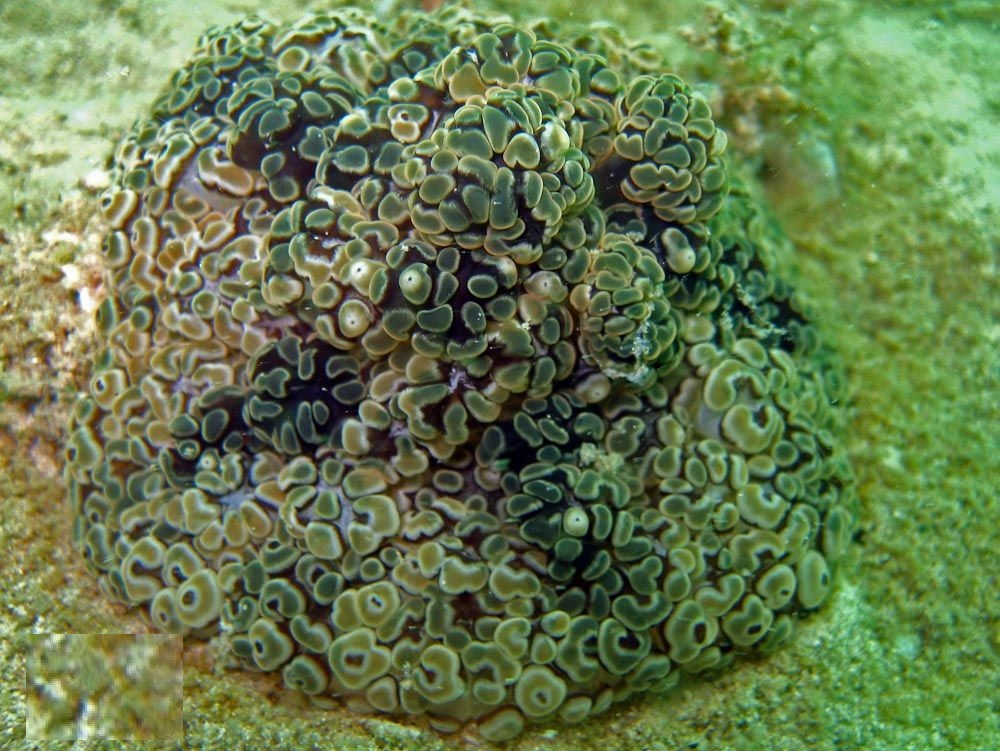

Scientific classification
- Kingdom: Animalia
- Phylum: Cnidaria
- Subphylum: Anthozoa
- Class: Hexacorallia
- Order: Actiniaria
- Family: Aliciidae
- Genus: Alicia
- Species: A. sansibarensis

Binomial name
- Alicia sansibarensis Carlgren, 1900

= Alicia sansibarensis =

Species of sea anemone

Alicia sansibarensis, commonly known as tuberculate night anemone, is a species of sea anemone in the family Aliciidae. It is found in the Indian and Pacific Oceans. Alicia sansibarensis have tentacles that are very long and snake, which are used for the protection of clownfish from predators.
