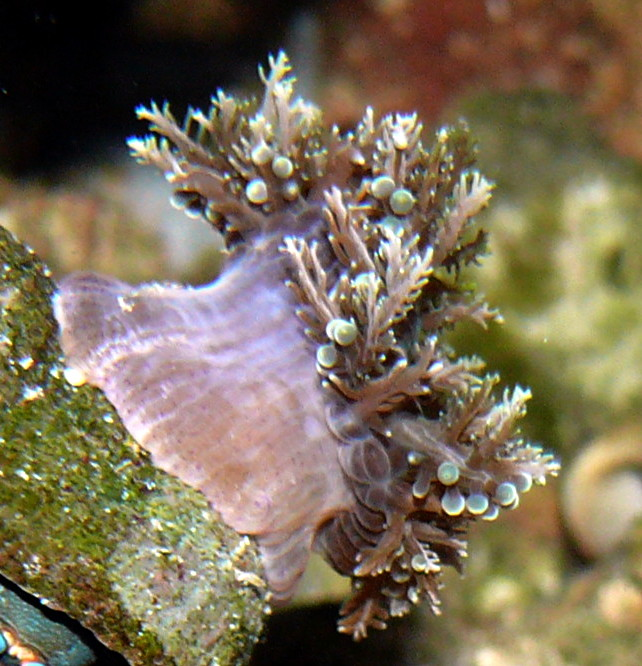
- Thalassianthus aster

Scientific classification
- Domain: Eukaryota
- Kingdom: Animalia
- Phylum: Cnidaria
- Subphylum: Anthozoa
- Class: Hexacorallia
- Order: Actiniaria
- Family: Thalassianthidae
- Genus: Thalassianthus

Synonyms
- Thalassianthes; Thallasianthus

= Thalassianthus =

Genus of sea anemones

Thalassianthus is a genus of sea anemones of the family Thalassianthidae.

== Species ==
The following species are recognized:

- Thalassianthus aster Rüppell & Leuckart, 1828
- Thalassianthus kraepelini Carlgren, 190
- Thalassianthus senckenbergianus Kwietniewski, 1896
