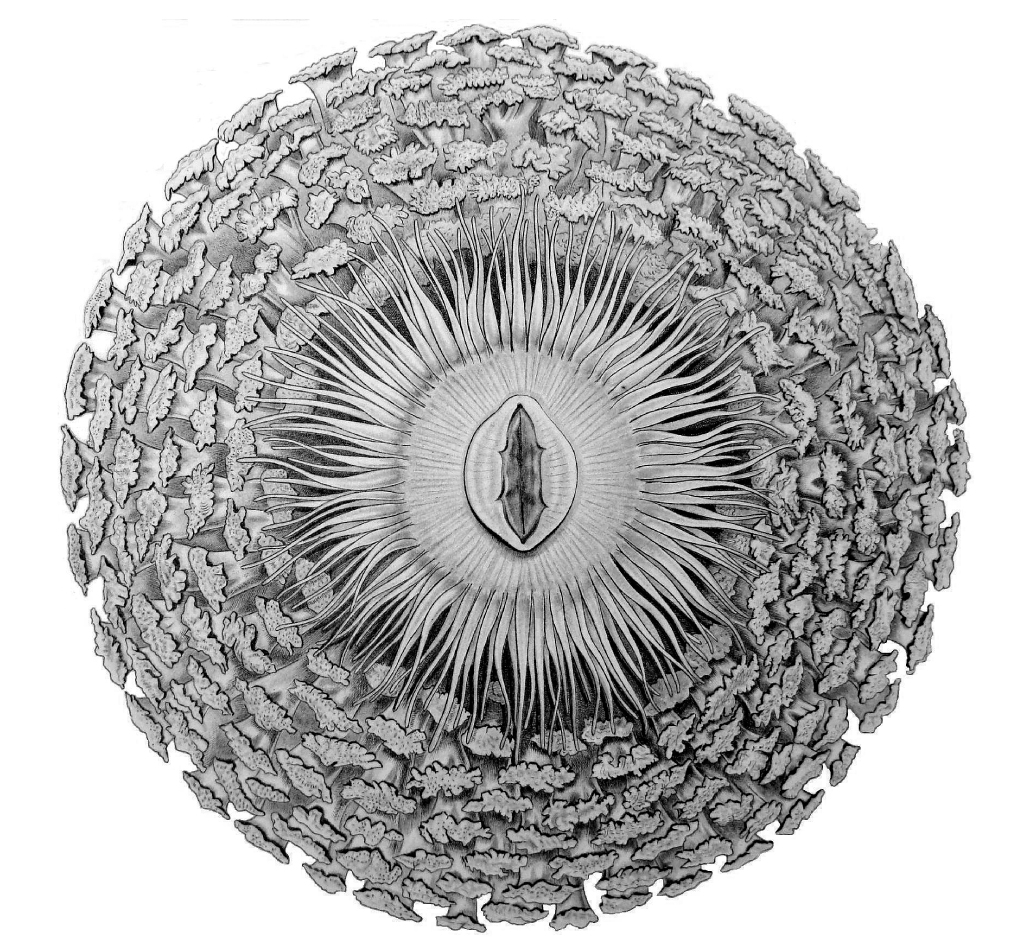
- Holotype of Phyllodiscus semoni (drawn from a preserved specimen)

Scientific classification
- Kingdom: Animalia
- Phylum: Cnidaria
- Subphylum: Anthozoa
- Class: Hexacorallia
- Order: Actiniaria
- Family: Aliciidae
- Genus: Phyllodiscus; Kwietniewski, 1897
- Species: P. semoni

Binomial name
- Phyllodiscus semoni Kwietniewski, 1897

= Phyllodiscus =

Phyllodiscus semoni

Genus of sea anemones

Phyllodiscus is a monotypic genus of sea anemones in the family Aliciidae. The only species is Phyllodiscus semoni, commonly known as the night anemone, which is native to shallow seas in the central Indo-West Pacific, such as Indonesia, the Philippines and southern Japan. It is venomous and can cause a painful, long-lasting sting to humans. It is called unbachi-isoginchaku in Japanese which translates as "wasp-sea anemone".

== Description ==
Phyllodiscus semoni has a broad basal disc attached to the substrate. The lower portion of the column is smooth and the middle section has a radially arranged series of pseudo-tentacles, thick, stalked and branched outgrowths which show great variety in their appearance between different individuals. There are a number of hemispherical vesicles on the branches, and occasionally on the stalks. These contain nematocysts containing short and long-shafted stinging threads. The upper section of the column is short and smooth with a few nematocysts. The oral disc has a marginal ring of up to 160 long tentacles, two siphonoglyphs (feeding grooves) and a central mouth.

== Behaviour ==
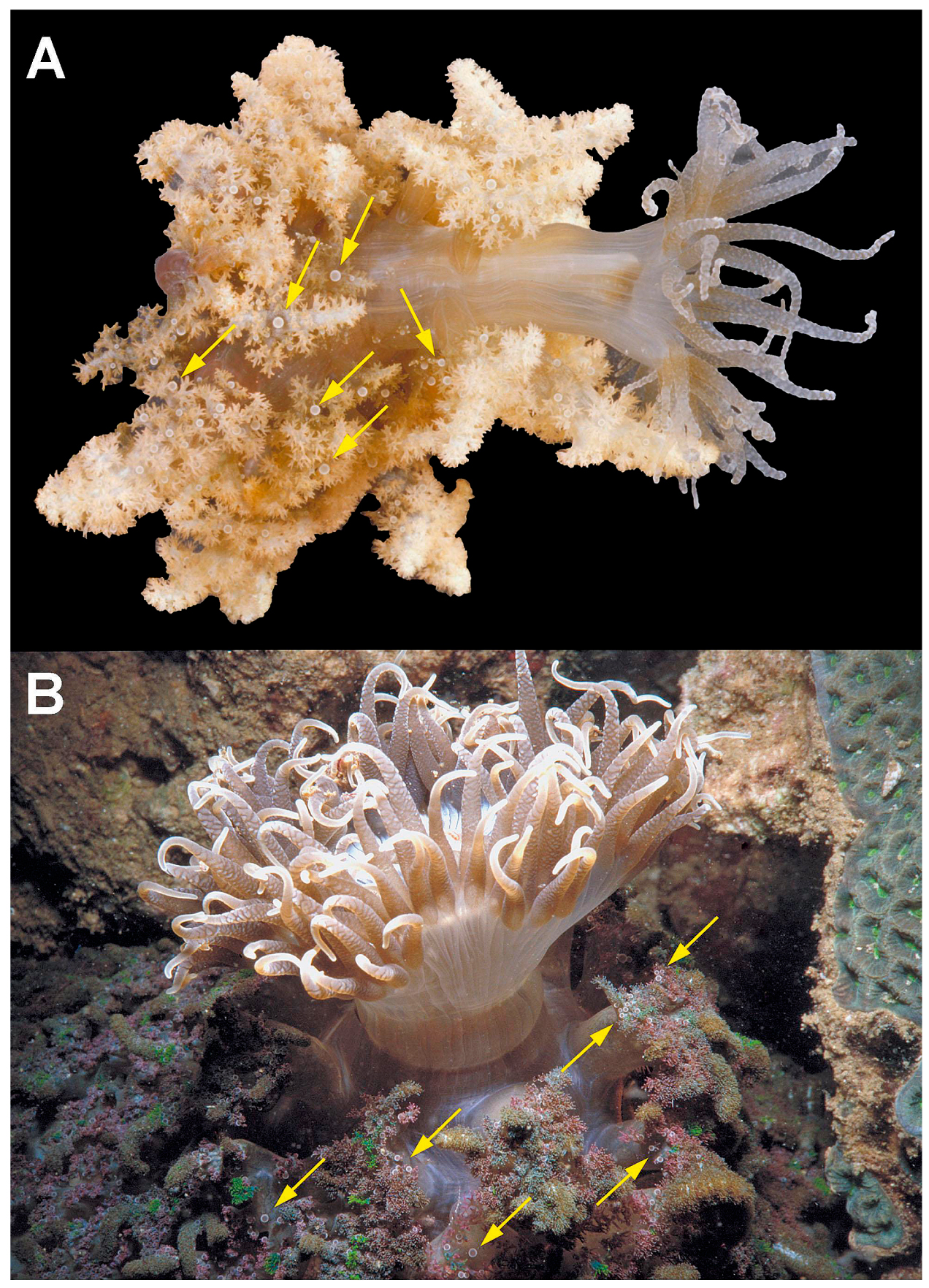
A = Branched morphotype with pseudotentacles (arrows show vesicles) B = Smooth disc morphotype

There are a range of different morphotypes of this sea anemone. Some are smooth discs, some are similar to branching corals and others to dead coral rock covered by algae, resembling these models not only in shape, but also in colour. Some individuals are solitary and others form aggregations of similar morphotypes. The aggregations include a range of different-sized individuals and are likely to be clones formed by asexual reproduction, possibly by fragmentation when the sea anemone moves across the substrate. The different morphotypes show great resemblance to corals, algae and other objects in the environment and the sea anemone seems to use camouflage, mimicry and masquerade to blend itself into its surroundings, deceive potential prey and confuse potential predators.

Phyllodiscus semoni is a zooxanthellate species of sea anemone, housing symbiotic photosynthetic dinoflagellates within its tissues. These are concentrated in the pseudotentacles which are spread out widely during the day to maximise their exposure to the light. At the same time the oral disc, mouth, and tentacles are retracted into the interior of the animal and it is not apparent that it is a sea anemone at all. At night the oral disc emerges and the tentacles expand to feed on zooplankton and small invertebrates.

== Venom ==
This sea anemone is venomous and its stings can cause painful injuries to humans, and on rare occasions can result in acute kidney damage. The toxin has been shown to kill the shrimp Palaemon paucidens and cause haemolysis in sheep red blood cells. Human contact with Phyllodiscus semoni can cause a severe dermatitis with ulceration and swelling of the affected part which may persist for months. Several haemolytic toxins have been isolated from Phyllodiscus semoni and it is the first sea anemone whose venom has been shown to damage the kidneys and cause acute renal failure. The venom does not appear to affect other major organs.
