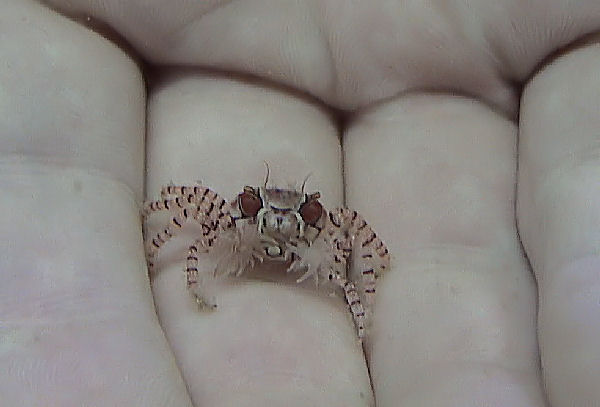
- Lybia edmondsoni with Triactis producta on the claws

Scientific classification
- Kingdom: Animalia
- Phylum: Cnidaria
- Subphylum: Anthozoa
- Class: Hexacorallia
- Order: Actiniaria
- Family: Aliciidae
- Genus: Triactis; Klunzinger, 1877
- Species: T. producta

Binomial name
- Triactis producta Johnson, 1861

Synonyms
- List: Actinia prehensa Moebius; Buneodopsis prehensa (Andrews) [lapsus]; Bunodeopsis prehensa (Möbius, 1880); Hoplophoria cincta (Haddon & Shackleton); Phyllodiscus cincta (Haddon & Shackleton, 1893); Phyllodiscus cinctus (Haddon & Shackleton, 1893); Phyllodiscus indicus Stephenson, 1921; Sagartia prehensa Moebius; Sagartia pugnax Verrill, 1928; Triactis cincta (Haddon & Schackleton, 1893); Viatrix cincta Haddon & Shackleton, 1893

= Triactis =

Triactis producta

Genus of sea anemones

Triactis is a genus of sea anemone in the family Aliciidae. It is monotypic, having only one species – Triactis producta. This species is found in shallow waters in the Indo-Pacific where it lives on the seabed, rocks and corals. It derives much of its energy needs from the symbiotic algae it contains. It also forms a mutualistic relationship with small Lybia crabs.

== Description ==
Triactis producta is a small, cryptic, pale brown sea anemone. The base grows to about 1 cm (0.4 in) in diameter and the column tapers slightly and extends to about 1.5 cm (0.6 in) in height. It is topped by a crown of about 50, relatively long tentacles. Halfway up the column there is a ring of branching, pale brown pseudo-tentacles. These are tubular extensions of the wall of the column and on their upper side there are a few semi-spherical bulges known as vesicles. These can be grey, pink or green and are packed with stinging cells called cnidocytes.

== Distribution and habitat ==
Triactis producta is found in shallow waters of the tropical Indo-Pacific Ocean, its range extending from the Red Sea and Mozambique to Hawaii and French Polynesia. It is inconspicuous, often growing in crevices and concealed among the branches of stony corals. It often occurs in dense clusters of what are probably cloned individuals.

== Biology ==
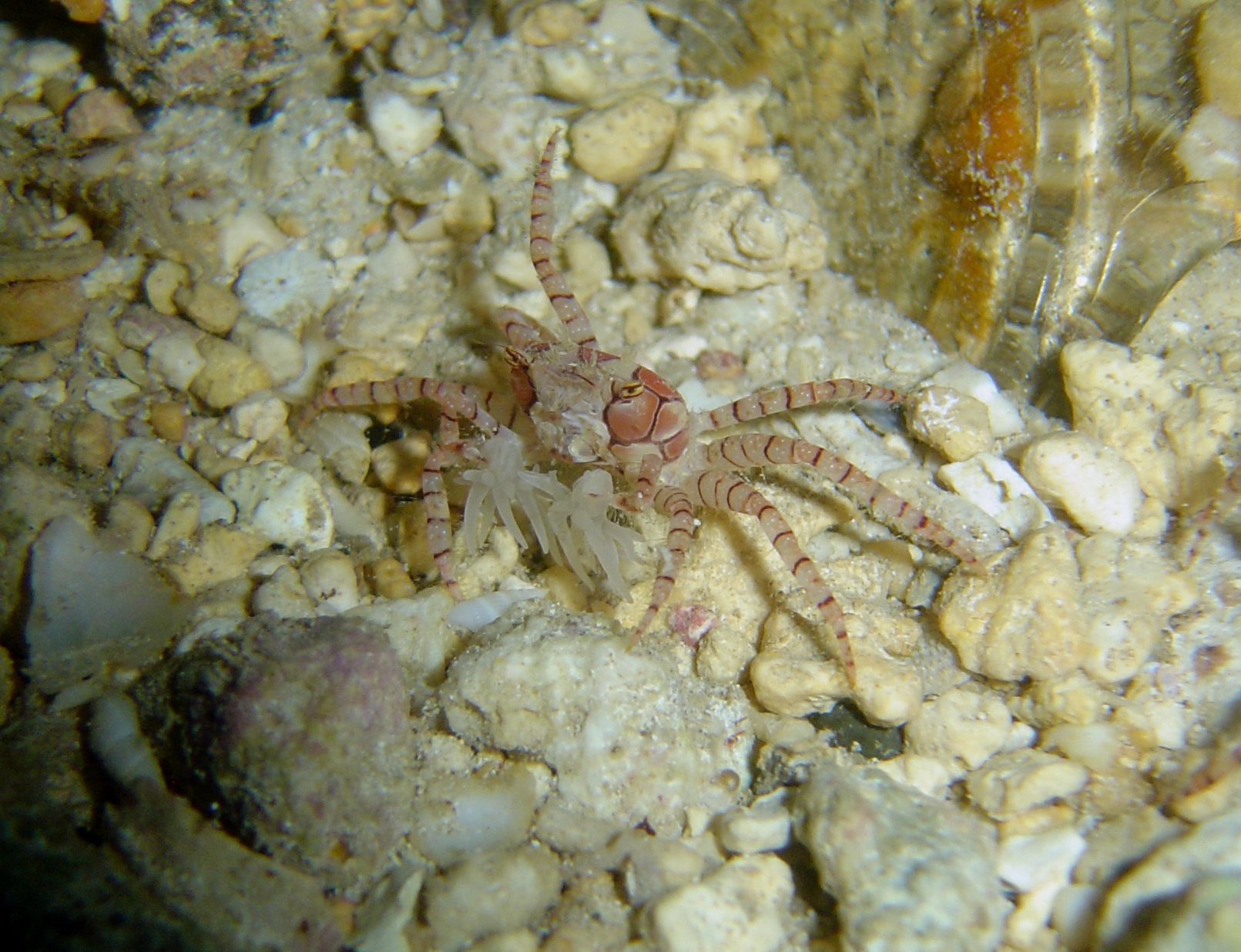
Lybia edmondsoni with Triactis producta

Triactis producta has two ways of feeding. In the daytime, when the light is bright, it retracts its tentacles and extends its pseudo-tentacles. These are dark brown because of the dense concentration of symbiotic algae known as zooxanthellae that they contain. These produce sugars by photosynthesis in sunlight which the anemone uses as nourishment. Retracting its tentacles maximises the photosynthetic potential of the anemone. The well-armed vesicles protect the pseudo-tentacles which may appear edible to a potential predator. At night, or when the animal is in a dim light, the crown of tentacles expands and the tentacles search for small invertebrates in the surrounding water, immobilising them with their cnidocytes.

Boxer crabs in the genus Lybia have developed a mutualistic relationship with small sea anemones such as Triactis producta. The crab's front limbs have modified chelae, each of which can gently grip a sea anemone by its column, and it usually holds one in each claw. The living anemone is brandished like a weapon to keep predators away and is also used in ritualistic territorial protection. The sea anemones used are small and seldom exceed a column height of 8 mm (0.3 in). If it loses one of its anemones, the crab can tear the other one in half, after which each part grows into a new individual. The crab also uses the anemones to immobilise and capture prey on its behalf. The sea anemones seem unharmed by being used in this way.

== Interactions with humans ==
In the Red Sea, Triactis producta is reported to be one of the most venomous of sea anemones. The symptoms of stings to bare skin include pain and swelling. In one reported case, these lasted for several weeks and were accompanied by a pigmented, blistered lesion and prolonged skin sensitivity. The toxic agent was found to be very stable and resistant to chemicals and heat treatment.
