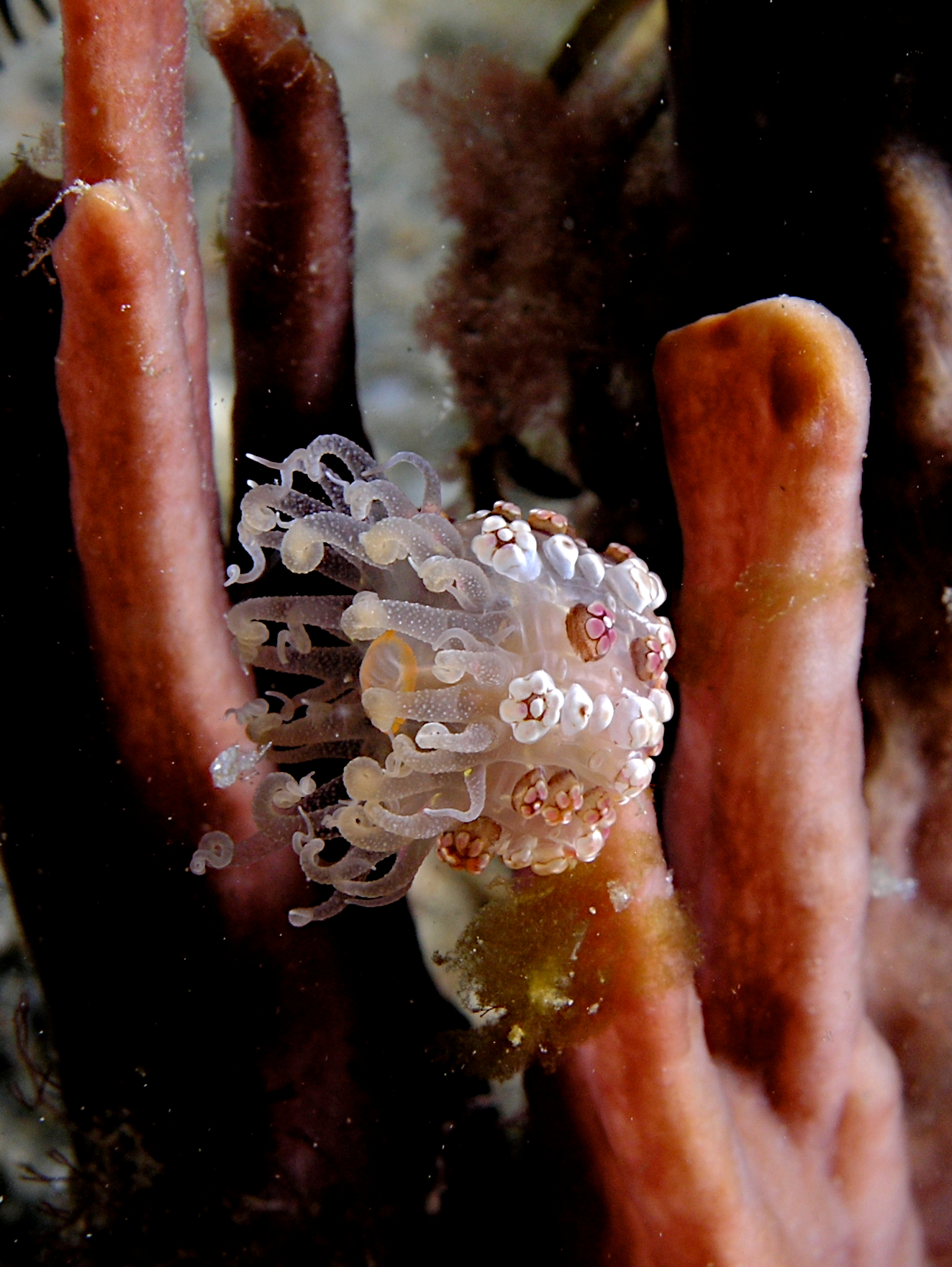
- Alicia rhadina (solitary anemone)

Scientific classification
- Kingdom: Animalia
- Phylum: Cnidaria
- Subphylum: Anthozoa
- Class: Hexacorallia
- Order: Actiniaria
- Family: Aliciidae
- Genus: Alicia; Johnson, 1861

= Alicia (cnidarian) =

Family of sea anemones

Alicia is a genus of sea anemones in the family Aliciidae and contains the following species:

- Alicia beebei Carlgren, 1940
- Alicia mirabilis Johnson, 1861
- Alicia pretiosa (Dana, 1846)
- Alicia rhadina Haddon & Shackleton, 1893
- Alicia sansibarensis Carlgren, 1900
- Alicia uruguayensis Carlgren, 1927
