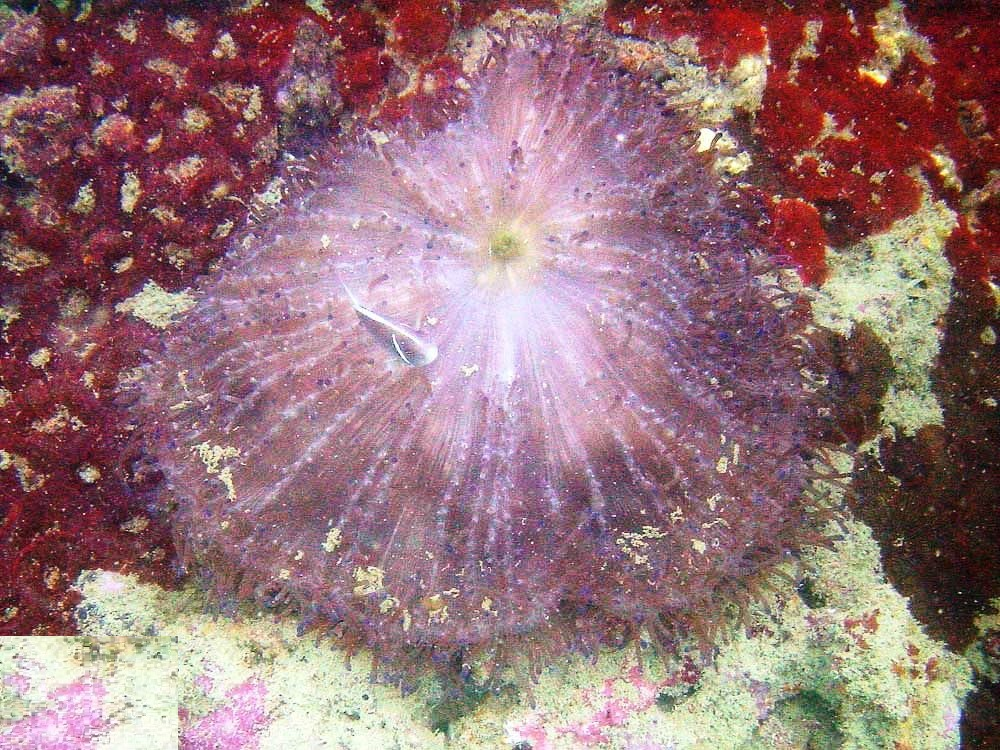
- Heterodactyla hemprichii

Scientific classification
- Domain: Eukaryota
- Kingdom: Animalia
- Phylum: Cnidaria
- Subphylum: Anthozoa
- Class: Hexacorallia
- Order: Actiniaria
- Family: Thalassianthidae
- Genus: Heterodactyla; Hemprich & Ehrenberg in Ehrenberg, 1834

= Heterodactyla =

Genus of sea anemones

Heterodactyla is a genus of sea anemones of the family Thalassianthidae. The genus was first described in 1834 by Wilhelm Hemprich and Christian Gottfried Ehrenberg.

== Species ==
The following species are recognized:

- Heterodactyla hemprichii
- Heterodactyla hypnoides
