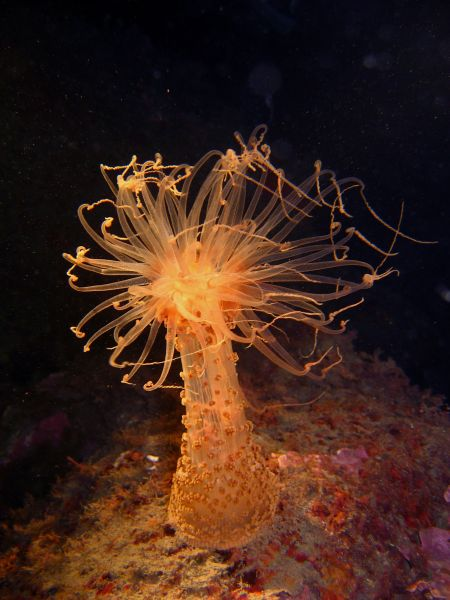

Conservation status
- Least Concern (IUCN 3.1) (Mediterranean)

Scientific classification
- Kingdom: Animalia
- Phylum: Cnidaria
- Subphylum: Anthozoa
- Class: Hexacorallia
- Order: Actiniaria
- Family: Aliciidae
- Genus: Alicia
- Species: A. mirabilis

Binomial name
- Alicia mirabilis Johnson, 1861

Synonyms
- Alicia costae (Panceri, 1868); Cladactis costa Panceri, 1868; Cladactis costae Panceri, 1868; Cladactis mirabilis (Johnson, 1861)

= Alicia mirabilis =

Species of sea anemone

Alicia mirabilis, commonly known as the berried anemone, is a species of sea anemone in the family Aliciidae. It changes shape as night falls expanding its column and tentacles to catch its food. It can be found in the Azores, Portugal, Spain and the Mediterranean and Red Seas.

== Description ==
By day, Alicia mirabilis resembles a pile of berries, thus the common name berried anemone. By night, it expands its column to up to 40 cm tall and opens its tentacles. When fully extended, the tentacles may actually be longer than the column height. Both the tentacles and the "berries" contain stinging cells.

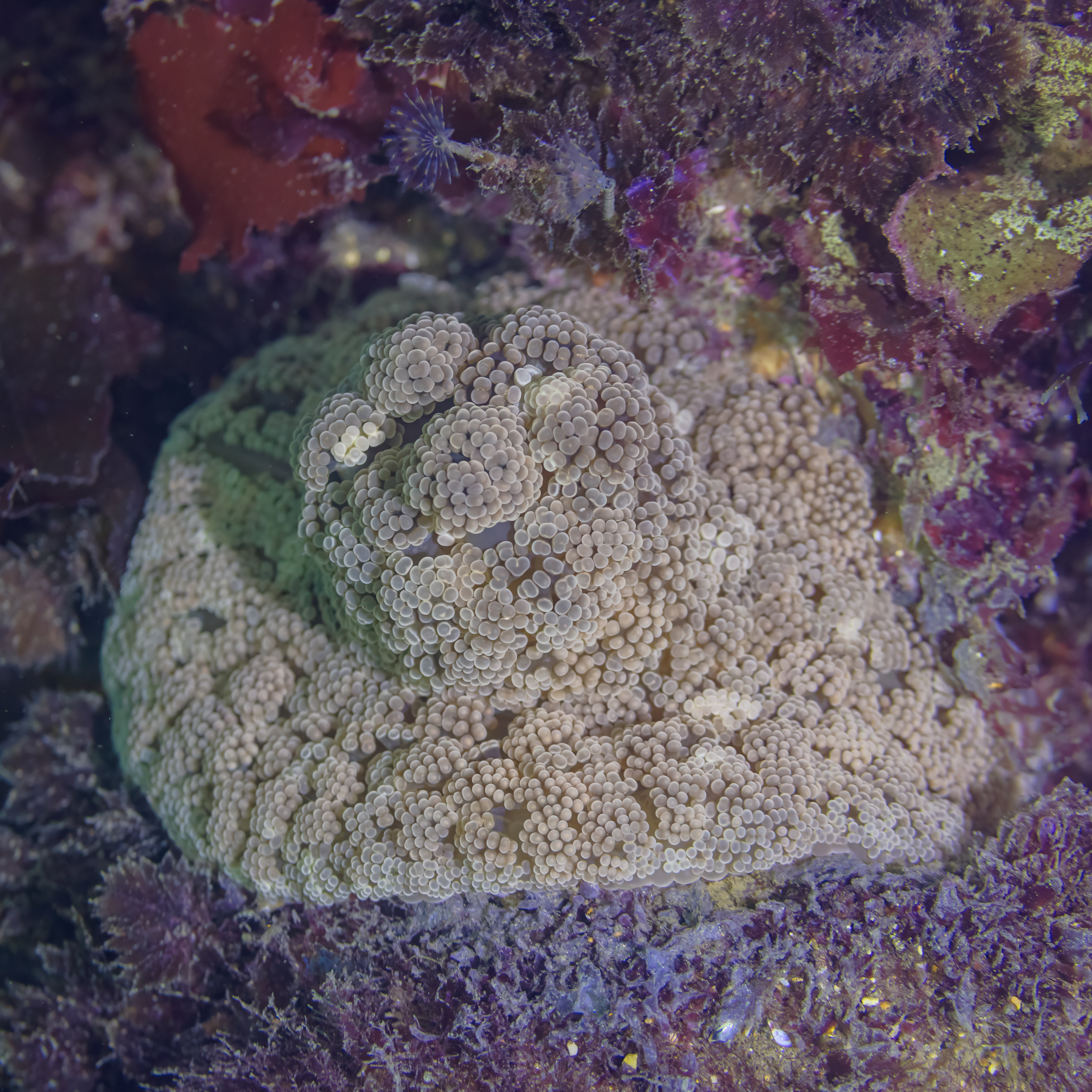
Aspect during the day
