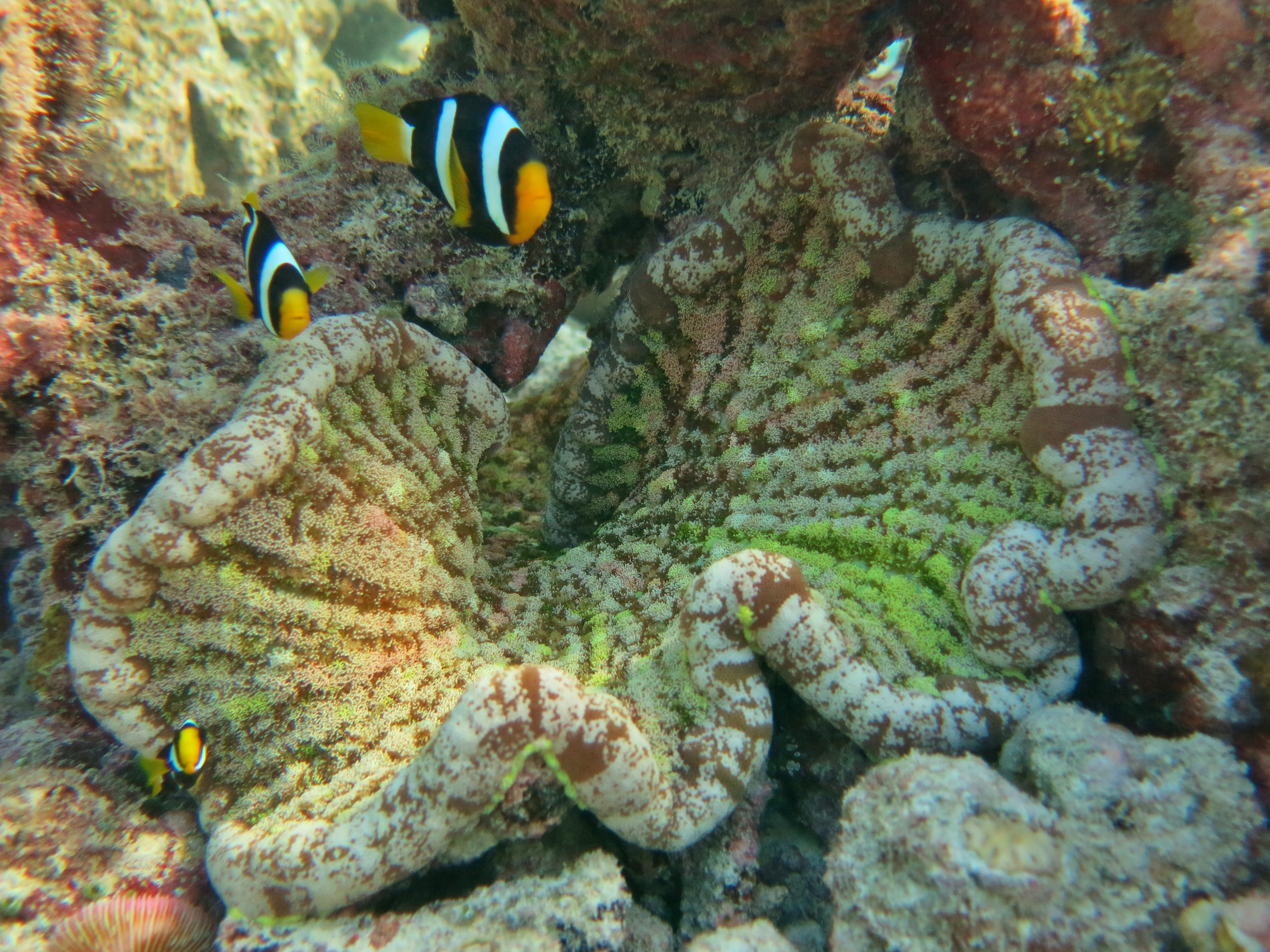
- C. adhaesium showing the distinctive edge tentacles

Scientific classification
- Kingdom: Animalia
- Phylum: Cnidaria
- Subphylum: Anthozoa
- Class: Hexacorallia
- Order: Actiniaria
- Family: Thalassianthidae
- Genus: Cryptodendrum; Klunzinger, 1877
- Species: C. adhaesivum

Binomial name
- Cryptodendrum adhaesivum (Klunzinger, 1877)

Synonyms
- (Genus): Cryptodendron Klunzinger, 1877; (Species): Cryptodendron adhaesivium; Cryptodendron adhaesivum; Cryptodendrum adhesivum [lapsus]; Stoichactis digitata Doumenc, 1973

= Cryptodendrum =

Genus of sea anemones

Cryptodendrum is a genus of sea anemones in the family Thalassianthidae. It is monotypic with a single species, Cryptodendrum adhaesivum, also commonly known as the adhesive anemone, pizza anemone, and nap-edged anemone. Like all symbiotic anemones it hosts zooxanthellae, symbiotic algae that help feed their host.

== Description ==
This anemone grows to a size of 30 centimeters and is distinguished by its colored, beaded and waving curved edge. It has two different forms of tentacles. At the center of the oral disc, it has narrow, short, about 5 mm long, tentacles that are branched with five or more "fingers", like a small, inflated rubber glove. The tentacles are extremely sticky. The tentacles at the edge have a bubble-like thickening of about one millimeter diameter at the end. The two types of tentacles are usually different colors.

=== Similar species ===
The two different tentacles and pizza crust type edge distinguish C. adhaesivum from superficially similar Stichodactyla specimens.

== Distribution ==
C. adhaesivum is widely distributed being found in tropical waters from the Indian Ocean to the Western Pacific.

== Symbionts ==
The relationship between anemonefish and their host sea anemones is highly nested in structure. This anemone however is able to survive without anemonefish and most specimens are found without anemonefish. As the single hosted anemonefish, Amphiprion clarkii, is the extreme generalist, it may be that C. adhaesivum is a marginal host tolerated only by the least selective fish and only when no other host is available.

C. adhaesivum is also associated with juvenile Dascyllus trimaculatus the threespot dascyllus.

A number of other species are associated with C. adhaesivum, however the relationship is commensal rather than mutual as the anemone does not appear to benefit from the association. These species are

- Neopetrolisthes maculatus a porcelain crab
- Shrimp from the Periclimenes genus
- Thor amboinensis the squat or sexy shrimp

== Gallery ==
C. adhaesivum and symbionts

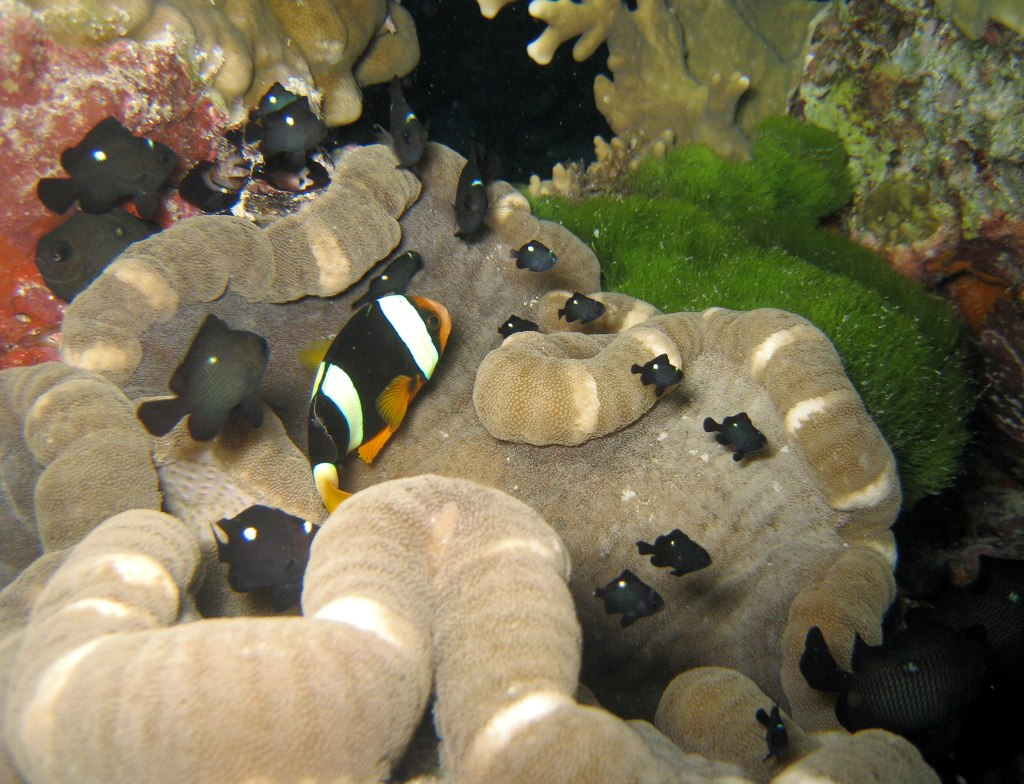
Amphiprion clarkii & Dascyllus trimaculatus

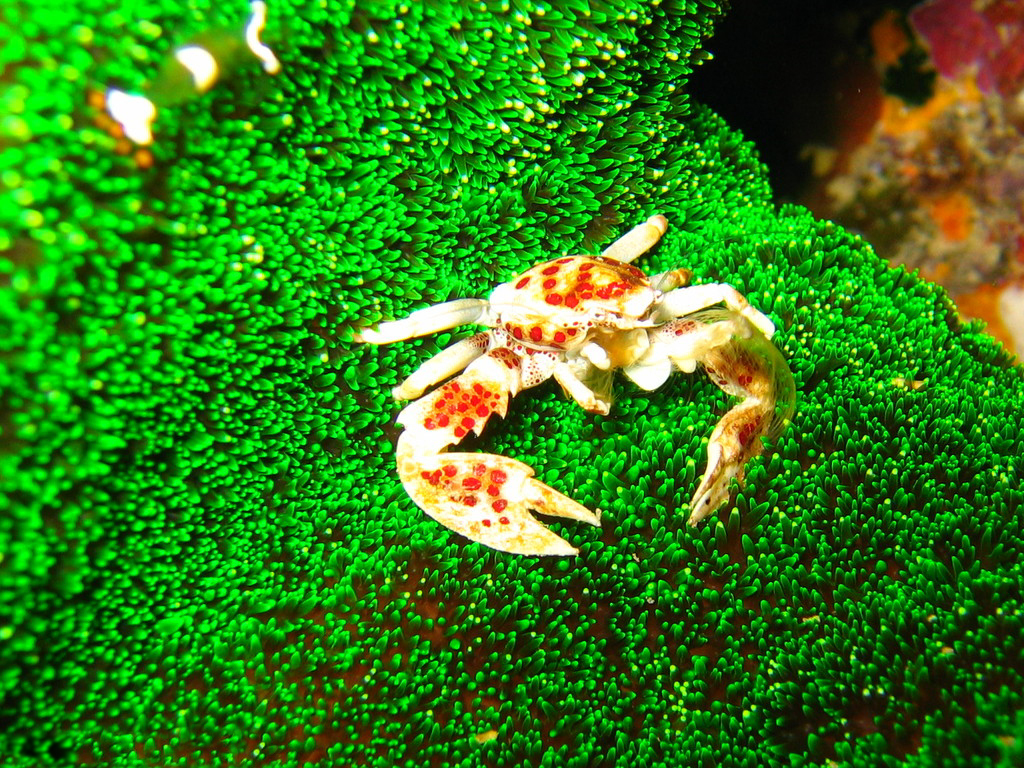
Neopetrolisthes maculatus (porcelain crab)
