= Mithraculus cinctimanus =

Scientific classification
- Kingdom: Animalia
- Phylum: Arthropoda
- Clade: Pancrustacea
- Class: Malacostraca
- Order: Decapoda
- Suborder: Pleocyemata
- Infraorder: Brachyura
- Family: Mithracidae
- Genus: Mithraculus
- Species: M. cinctimanus

Binomial name
- Mithraculus cinctimanus Stimpson, 1860

Synonyms
- Mithrax (Mithraculus) commensalis Manning, 1970; Mithrax affinis Desbonne, 1867

Species of crab

Mithraculus cinctimanus, the banded clinging crab, is a species of crab in the family Majidae. It is found in the Caribbean region and is usually associated with a sea anemone, sponge or coral.

== Description ==
Mithraculus cinctimanus is a small crab with an oval carapace slightly longer than it is wide. The front third is slightly hairy and the surface of the hind two thirds is roughened by small tubercles. The front edge has several blunt spines. The colour of the carapace is variable often being olive brown with several large creamy patches. The legs have bands of the same colours and their outer segments are hairy. The fingers of the chelae do not completely close and have rounded tips. An adult Mithraculus cinctimanus is about 22 millimetres (0.87 in) long.

== Distribution ==
Mithraculus cinctimanus is found in the Caribbean region its range including Florida, the West Indies, Curaçao, Colombia and Venezuela.

== Biology ==
Mithraculus cinctimanus feeds on filamentous green algae growing on rocks. Young crabs are often found living on the surface of the mushroom coral Ricordea florida. At this stage of their lives, the carapace is often covered with felt-like red algae which provides the crab with camouflage.

== Ecology ==
Mithraculus cinctimanus is usually found living commensally with a sponge, coral or a sea anemone. The host is often the sun sea anemone Stichodactyla helianthus or in deeper water, the anemone Lebrunia danae. On this latter anemone, Mithraculus cinctimanus is part of an assemblage of commensal invertebrates each occupying its own characteristic position. It is found hiding under the rim of extended pseudotentacles and when these are retracted, it also retreats leaving only its chelae, eyes and the front part of its head exposed. It seldom moves away from the anemone and seems to be immune to the stings produced by its host's nematocysts.
