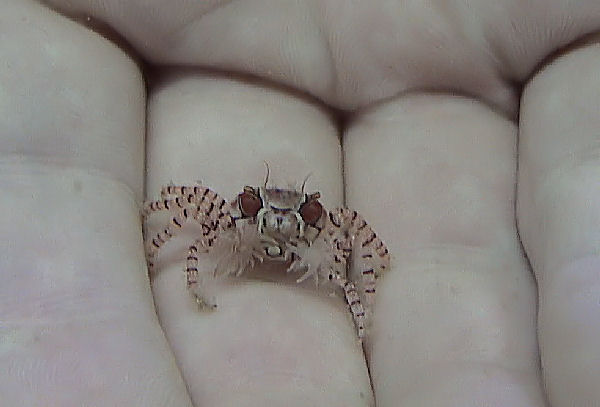
- Hawaiian pompom crab, Lybia edmondsoni

Scientific classification
- Kingdom: Animalia
- Phylum: Arthropoda
- Clade: Pancrustacea
- Class: Malacostraca
- Order: Decapoda
- Suborder: Pleocyemata
- Infraorder: Brachyura
- Family: Xanthidae
- Subfamily: Polydectinae
- Genus: Lybia; H. Milne-Edwards, 1834

Type species
- Grapse tessellata Latreille in Milbert, 1812

= Lybia =

Lybia Temporal range: Early Middle Miocene-Present, 16–0 Ma

Genus of crabs

Lybia is a genus comprising eight species of small marine crabs from the family Xanthidae. Commonly known as boxer crabs and pom-pom crabs, these crabs are famous for their symbiosis with small aquatic invertebrates, particularly sea anemones, which they hold in their specialized claws for defense, and in some cases, feeding. The genus has a diverse distribution, ranging across the Indo-Pacific and existing as early as the Middle Miocene.

== Morphology ==
Lybia crabs are small, achieving a maximum size of 1–2 cm (0.39–0.79 in) in adulthood. Each chela (claw) is equipped with a set of small hooks, which aid the crab in maintaining its grasp on the anemone. These claws are decidedly specialized for carrying anemones, which appears to be their only function for the crab; when anemones are absent, Lybia chelae have not been observed in use for burrowing, defence, or prey capture. They are devoid of any stereotypical features commonly associated with crab chelae. Thus, food gathering, burrowing, intraspecific relations, and anemone collection must instead be done with the crab's walking limbs. Chelae are delicate and have no recorded observations of sexual dimorphism.

Size, colouration, and shape of the carapace, chelae, and associated hooks are common diagnostic features for distinguishing the species of Lybia.

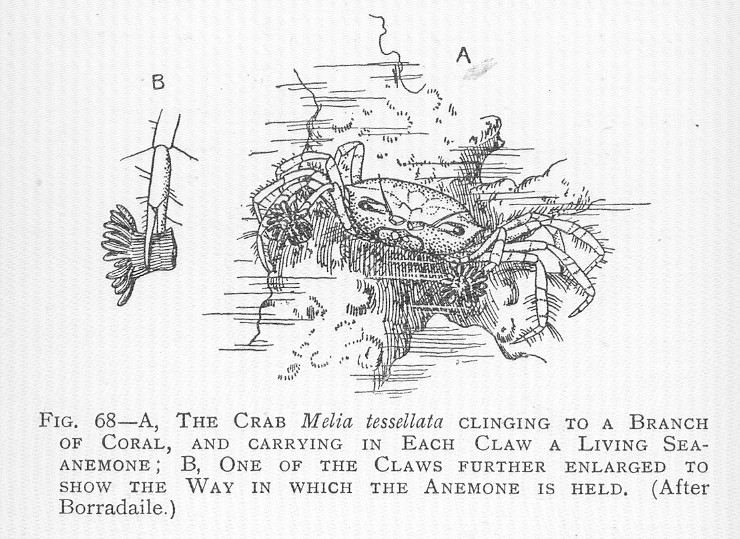
Diagram of Lybia tessellata carrying anemones, with a close-up of the chela and its hooks

== Distribution ==
Occurrences reported to GBIF as of April 2025 marked in red

The eight extant species within Lybia are distributed across varying regions of the Indo-Pacific, including Hawaii, Indonesia, Japan, Australia, and Africa. They tend to reside in warm, shallow marine waters, often hidden beneath rocks or coral. The specific range of each species of Lybia is dependent on the distribution of their specific anemone symbiont.

== Ecology ==
=== Behaviour ===
Lybia are commonly referred to as 'pom-pom crabs' for their cheerleader-like appearance, often carrying a single anemone in each of their claws. Several other variations of anemone holding have been reported, however. If the anemone is too large, the crab may use its walking legs to assist in holding the symbiont. In other cases, the crab may carry more than two anemones, using its walking legs to carry the extras. If the crab somehow loses an anemone, it can induce splitting, which tears the remaining anemone into two fragments that regenerate into complete individuals. In other instances, where both anemones are lost, the crab may try to "steal" one from rival crabs.

During moulting, Lybia crabs temporarily release their anemones, later retrieving them from the shed exoskeleton and carefully taking them back one at a time. Similarly, during grooming, they also temporarily release one anemone, securing it with the first walking leg on the same side, and using the free claw to clean the frontal region. Some species, such as Lybia leptochelis, exhibit swapping behaviour; the crab may replace smaller anemones with larger ones, but never the reverse.

The uniqueness of symbioses between Lybia crabs and sea anemones is multi-faceted. For the crab, this relationship is a form of obligate symbiosis, as they almost always equip sea anemones in their claws. Through these extensive interactions between the crab and their anemone symbionts, Lybia crabs often alter their anemone's long-term structure. The anemone pom-poms often appear reduced in size compared to free-living ones. For example, the sea anemone's column outgrowths may be altered from these symbiotic interactions. Lybia species tend to prefer anemones that do not have outgrowths, as this allows for easier handling. Other invertebrates with a variety of morphological features have also demonstrated this phenomenon when found in symbiosis with Lybia.

Gries et al. (2023) suggested that anemone-waving motion made by Lybia are to deter predation. In contrast, Schnytzer et al. (2013) recognised an unusual case of kleptoparasitism between Lybia and anemones. The crab, being larger than the anemone, uses it to obtain food at the expense of the anemone's foraging and growth, rather than the other way around as seen in most other kleptoparasitic relationships.

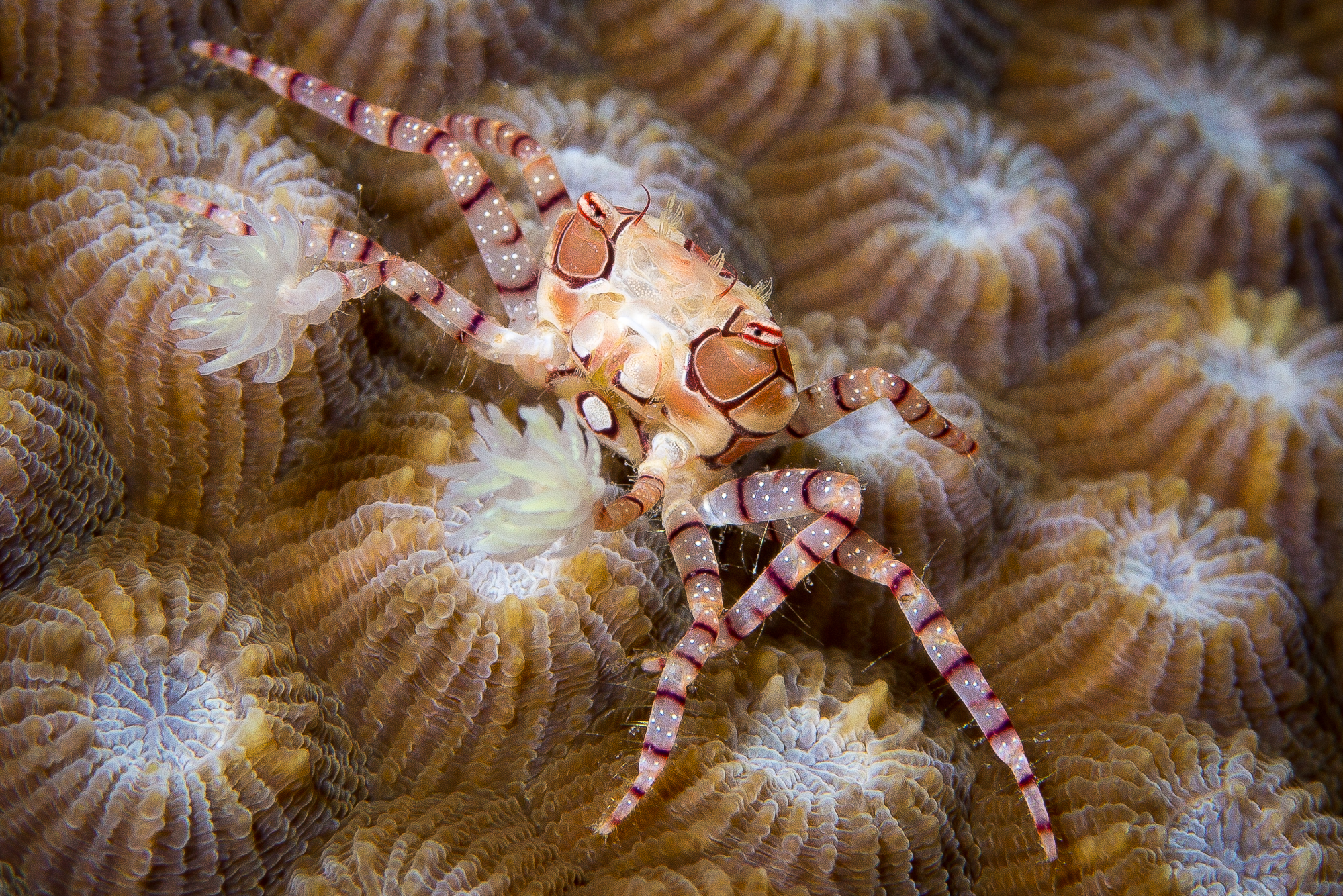
Lybia tessellata displaying its anemone pom-poms

=== Fighting ===
Fighting in Lybia is poorly documented. Most observations involve Lybia edmondsoni, which rarely makes direct contact with its anemones during intraspecific contests. Instead of direct claw-to-claw fighting, Lybia edmondsoni display their anemones by waving or extending them with the claw most distant from their opponent. Physical engagement primarily involves contact between the walking legs, with the anemones rarely making contact with the crab. Crabs that take part in these intraspecific interactions are often referred to as boxer crabs, as their motions mimic boxing matches, with the anemones as their gloves.

Many hypotheses exist for the purpose of this fighting strategy. One possible reason is that the anemones might be toxic to both crabs. If used in contests, they could pose a risk of harming not only their opponent, but also the crab carrying them. An alternative hypothesis suggests the opposite, stating that the anemones are harmless to Lybia edmondsoni, making them ineffective as weapons. A third possibility is that anemones are considered too valuable or fragile, so crabs avoid using them in combat to prevent potential damage or loss.

Male and female crabs exhibit similar fighting behaviours, likely because their claws are equally adapted for holding anemones rather than for combat.

=== Feeding ===
The first anemone-carrying behaviours recognized by Mobius in 1880 were those related to feeding. Lybia tesselata was found carrying a pair of live anemones with small hooks in its chelae, seemingly using the pair for food collection. Since then, different species of Lybia have been found using their anemone symbionts in varying manners to aid in food collection and intake. Three documented strategies are outlined below.

Prey stunning
Prey such as small fish or invertebrates are paralyzed using the cnidocytes of the crab's symbiont, notably seen in Lybia tessellata and Lybia leptochelis.
Grasping food
Anemones are used as tools. Lybia edmondsoni has employed this strategy by 'mopping' its anemone so that food is collected on the polyp. The crab then collects food particles from the anemone's surface via its walking limbs. In some cases, the crab will even grasp ingested food from the anemone's pharynx.
Distance
Anemones are held away from the food source, maximizing food access for the crab. Remaining particles collected by the symbiont may then be grasped from the anemone, as seen in Lybia leptochelis.

Food-grasping and anemone-distancing strategies are considered forms of kleptoparasitic interactions. In these interactions, the restriction of food access by the crab causes the anemone to remain at a reduced size, like a bonsai. In the absence of this kleptoparasitic interaction, the anemone will grow to considerably larger sizes.

=== Reproduction ===
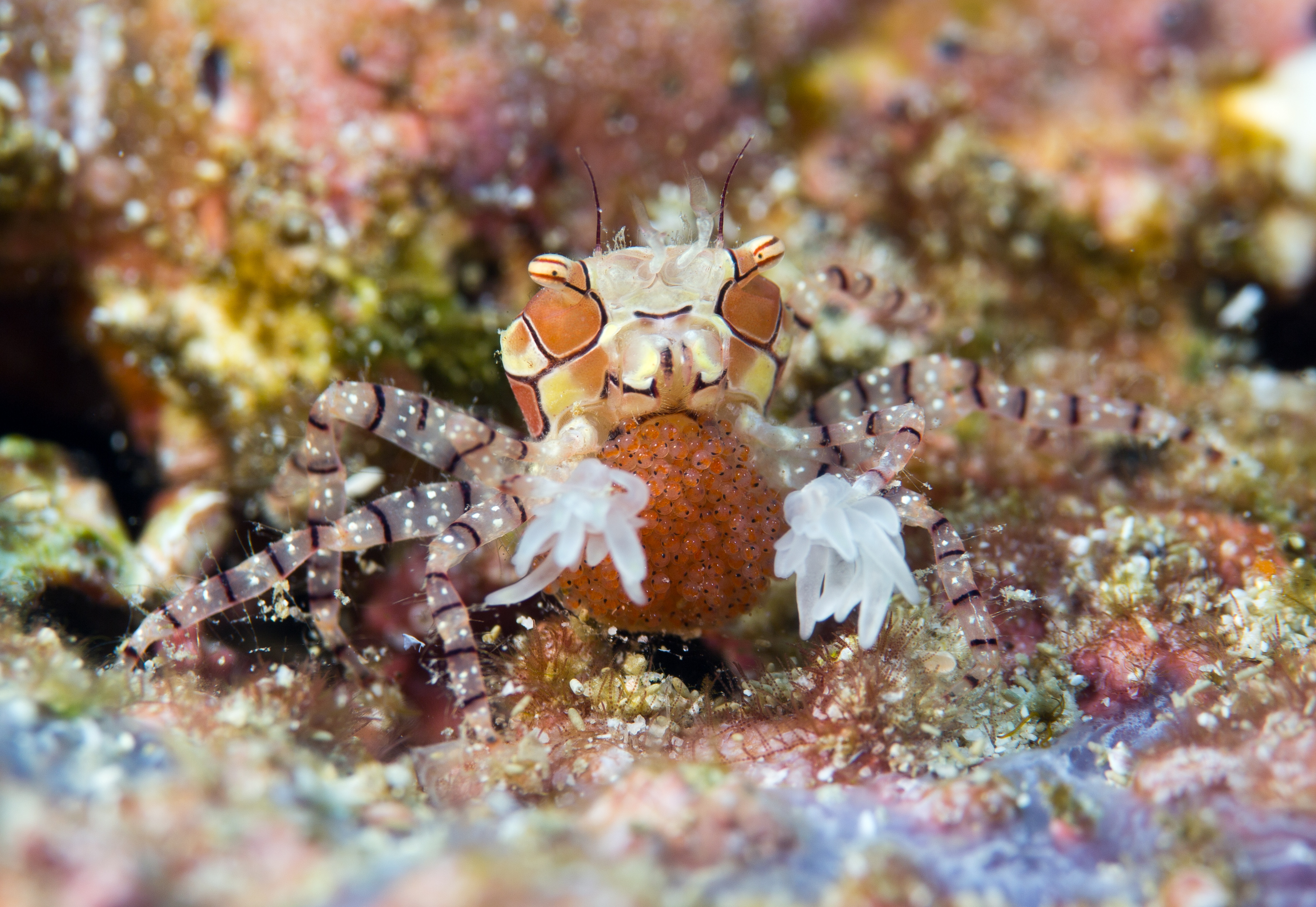
A gravid Lybia tessellata female carrying eggs within the abdominal apron

Very little is known regarding Lybia reproduction. However, studies of Leptodius crabs from the subfamily Xanthinae indicate that xanthid crabs are gravid during the summer months and release their eggs around September. Although the exact mechanism of reproduction is unknown, Lybia tessellata has been observed carrying its eggs within the abdominal apron.

== Taxonomy ==
Lybia was first classified as a genus by Henri Milne-Edwards in 1834, with Grapse tessellata (later changed to Lybia tessellata) as the type species.

The number of species within Lybia may be contentious. Previously, ten species were documented; two have moved to a different genus and others may not be adequately defined. The species Tunebia hatagumoana and Tunebia tutelenia, once part of Lybia, now form the genus Tunebia. Additionally, it has been suggested that Lybia leptochelis and Lybia pugil may be synonyms due to their morphological similarities. These ten species, with the addition of the teddy bear crab (Polydectus cupulifer) of another genus, form the subfamily Polydectinae.

The genus Lybia currently contains eight documented species:
| Species | Image | Known Distribution |
|---|---|---|
| Lybia australiensis (Ward, 1933) | None available. | Australia |
| Lybia caestifera (Alcock, 1898) | | China, Indian Ocean, Indonesia, Pacific Ocean, Papua New Guinea |
| Lybia denticulata Nobili, 1906 | | Red Sea |
| Lybia edmondsoni Takeda & Miyake, 1970 | | Hawaii (endemic) |
| Lybia leptochelis (Zehntner, 1894) | | Red Sea, Fiji, Indonesia, Indo-Pacific (broad oceanic range) |
| Lybia plumosa Barnard, 1947 | None available. | South Africa, Indo-Pacific (broad oceanic range) |
| Lybia pugil (Alcock, 1898) | | Australia, Indo-Pacific (broad oceanic range) |
| Lybia tessellata (Latreille in Milbert, 1812) | | East Africa, Red Sea, Indonesia, Australia, Indo-Pacific (broad oceanic range) |

Using mitochondrial genomics, it has been estimated that the anemone-holding habits of Lybia's subfamily Polydectinae likely evolved during the Eocene 43 million years ago. A fossilized carapace attributed to a species of Lybia has been retrieved from Megami Limestone, a locality from the Megami Formation, Japan, and dated to the early Middle Miocene.

== Human use ==
Crabs of Lybia have grown common in popular culture and media due to their cute size and interesting anemone-behaviours. Some species, such as Lybia tessellata, are also growing in popularity as pets among marine aquarists. Since no established aquaculture techniques exist for Lybia, all traded individuals are sourced from the wild. The continuous harvesting from coral reefs raises concerns about its ecological consequences, particularly given its specialized symbiotic relationship with sea anemones. Even in regions with existing regulations, local or national agencies often only limit the number of individuals that can be collected per day. These regulations may not fully account for total harvest impact or population sustainability.

Marine ornamental decapods are widely traded for their aesthetic appeal, with individual prices varying significantly among species. In 2003, Lybia tessellata was particularly notable in this trade, with an average price of $30 per individual, making it the second-most expensive species among marine ornamental decapods. However, due to a lack of research on its larval development, it has not yet been a major focus of commercial breeding programs.
