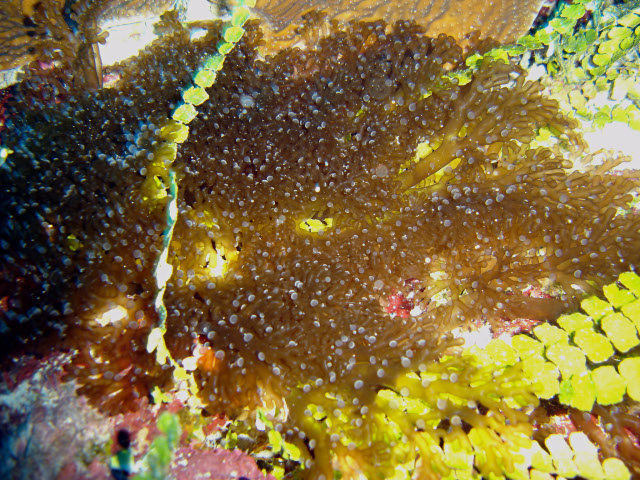
- Lebrunia coralligens

Scientific classification
- Kingdom: Animalia
- Phylum: Cnidaria
- Subphylum: Anthozoa
- Class: Hexacorallia
- Order: Actiniaria
- Family: Aliciidae
- Genus: Lebrunia; Duchassaing de Fonbressin & Michelotti, 1860

Synonyms
- Labrunia; Lebrunea; Lubrunia

= Lebrunia (cnidarian) =

Genus of sea anemones

Lebrunia is a genus of sea anemones in the family Aliciidae.

== Species ==
The following species are recognized:

- Lebrunia coralligens (Wilson, 1890)
- Lebrunia neglecta Duchassaing & Michelotti, 1860
