= Lybia australiensis =

Scientific classification
- Kingdom: Animalia
- Phylum: Arthropoda
- Clade: Pancrustacea
- Class: Malacostraca
- Order: Decapoda
- Suborder: Pleocyemata
- Infraorder: Brachyura
- Family: Xanthidae
- Genus: Lybia
- Species: L. australiensis

Binomial name
- Lybia australiensis (Ward, 1933)

Synonyms
- Prolybia australiensis Ward, 1933

Species of crab

Lybia australiensis is a species of small crab in the family Xanthidae. It is known only from the type specimen, collected in 1928 among bryozoans at Port Jackson, New South Wales.
