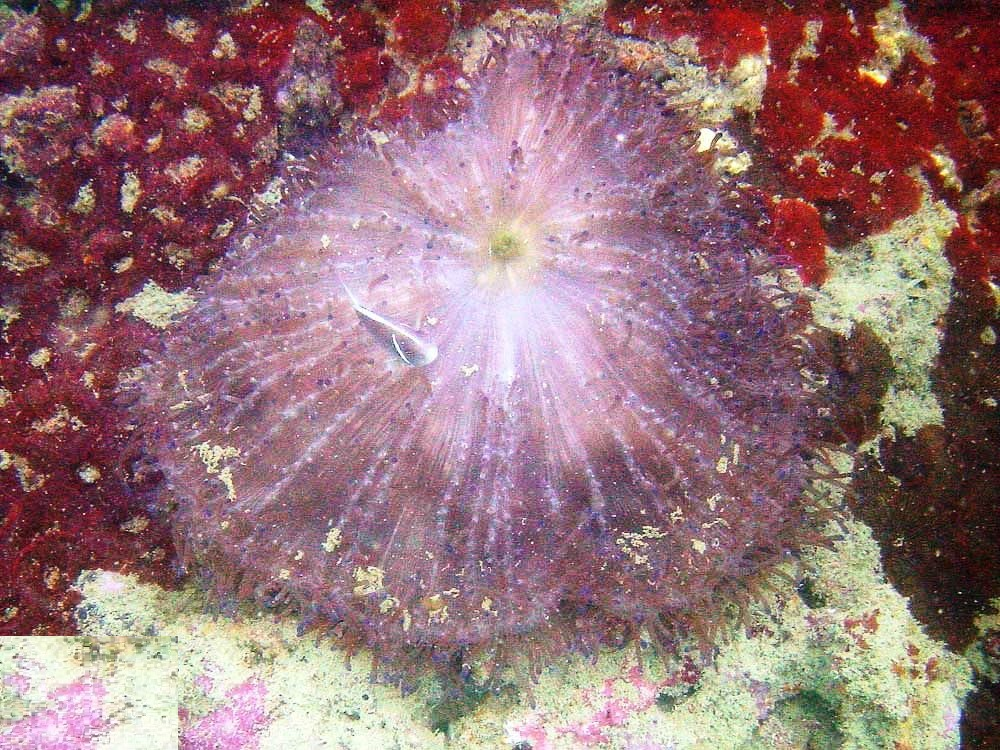
- Heterodactyla hemprichii

Scientific classification
- Kingdom: Animalia
- Phylum: Cnidaria
- Subphylum: Anthozoa
- Class: Hexacorallia
- Order: Actiniaria
- Superfamily: Actinioidea
- Family: Thalassianthidae; Milne-Edwards, 1857

Genera
- Actineria; Cryptodendrum; Heterodactyla; Thalassianthus

= Thalassianthidae =

Family of sea anemones

Thalassianthidae is a family of sea anemones that contains the genera Actineria, Cryptodendrum, Heterodactyla, and Thalassianthus. These sea anemones do not host any varieties of clownfishes, but have been associated with some species of commensal anemone shrimp.

Research has shown that three species of sea anemones belonging to the family Thalassianthidae - (Cryptodendrum adhaesivum, Heterodactyla hemprichii and Thalassianthus aster) - contain type 2 sodium channel peptide toxins capable of causing lethality to freshwater crabs. In addition, high molecular weight toxins appear to be a new type of toxin in the Thalassianthidae family of sea anemones. This information has not been found on any other scientific paper up to this point in time. Heterodactyla hemprichii is a species of sea anemone in the family Thalassianthidae This sea anemone does not host any varieties of clownfish.
