= Jacques-Gérard Milbert =

French painter

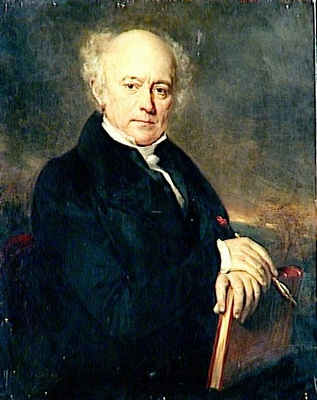
Jacques-Gérard Milbert, painted by Jean-Sébastien Rouillard (1831)

Jacques-Gérard Milbert (18 November 1766 – 5 June 1840) was a French naturalist and artist.

Milbert was a pupil of the landscape painter Pierre-Henri de Valenciennes, and went on to teach drawing at the Parisian school of mines – the École nationale supérieure des mines de Paris – from 1795.

In 1800, Milbert embarked on Nicolas Baudin's voyage to Australia. During the voyage, Milbert and several other artists became ill, and the artists and the captain came into conflict. This caused several artists, including Milbert, to leave the voyage at Mauritius, leaving Charles-Alexandre Lesueur to produce the voyage's scientific drawings. Milbert returned to France, where in 1812 he published a series of views of Mauritius, the Cape Colony and Tenerife, titled Voyage pittoresque à l'Ile de France, au Cap de Bonne Espérence et à l'Ile de Ténériffe, comprising two octavo volumes of text, and one quarto volume of plates.

In 1815, Milbert travelled to the United States, where he would remain for eight years, based in New York City, teaching, and travelling extensively in the northeastern United States. During his time there, he sent back 48 shipments of natural history specimens to the Muséum national d'histoire naturelle in Paris.

Milbert returned to France on 20 October 1823, and began teaching, again at the school of mines. He published several further volumes, including drawings from his travels in the United States. He died on 5 June 1840.

Milbert was awarded the Légion d'honneur and, after a campaign by scientists who had received his specimens, the government agreed to pay Milbert's widow a pension.
