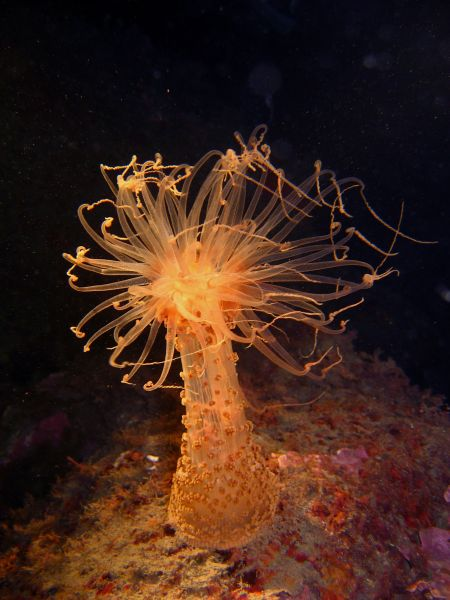
- Alicia mirabilis

Scientific classification
- Kingdom: Animalia
- Phylum: Cnidaria
- Subphylum: Anthozoa
- Class: Hexacorallia
- Order: Actiniaria
- Superfamily: Metridioidea
- Family: Aliciidae; Duerden, 1895

Genera
- See text

= Aliciidae =

Family of sea anemones

Aliciidae is a family of sea anemones, comprising the following genera:

- Alicia Johnson, 1861
- Cradactis McMurrich, 1893
- Lebrunia Duchassaing de Fonbressin & Michelotti, 1860
- Phyllodiscus Kwietniewski, 1897
- Triactis Klunzinger, 1877
