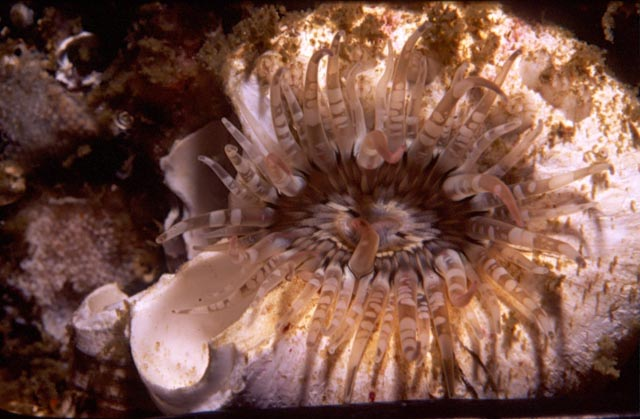

Scientific classification
- Kingdom: Animalia
- Phylum: Cnidaria
- Subphylum: Anthozoa
- Class: Hexacorallia
- Order: Actiniaria
- Family: Isanthidae
- Genus: Isanthus
- Species: I. capensis

Binomial name
- Isanthus capensis Carlgren, 1938

= Ring-tentacle anemone =

Species of sea anemone

The ring-tentacle anemone (Isanthus capensis) is a species of sea anemone in the family Isanthidae. This anemone was first described in 1938 by the Swedish zoologist, Oskar Carlgren.

== Description ==
The ring-tentacle anemone grows up to 1 cm in diameter. It is a small solitary anemone with numerous short striped tentacles and having stripes radiating out from its mouth. It is usually brown or greenish and its body column is smooth.

== Distribution ==
It has so far been found only on the Atlantic coast of the Cape Peninsula of South Africa. It appears to be endemic to this area, and lives from the intertidal zone down to about 5m under water. (It has apparently also been found in South Korea, in Gyeongsangnam-do and Namhae-do.)

== Ecology ==
This anemone is found between rocks and on seaweeds. It feeds on plankton.
