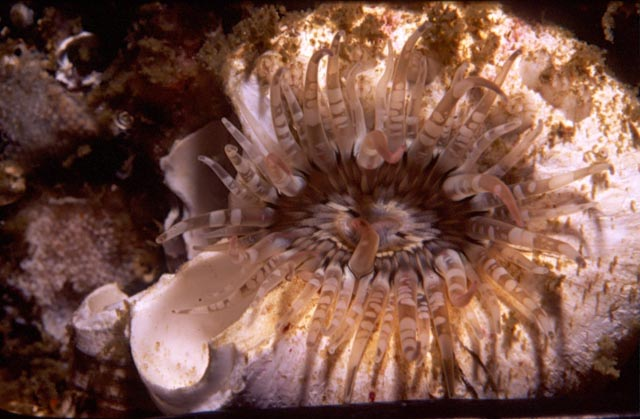
- Ring-tentacle anemone

Scientific classification
- Kingdom: Animalia
- Phylum: Cnidaria
- Subphylum: Anthozoa
- Class: Hexacorallia
- Order: Actiniaria
- Family: Isanthidae
- Genus: Isanthus

Species
- See text

= Isanthus =

Genus of sea anemones

Isanthus is a genus of sea anemones in the family Isanthidae.

== Species ==
Species in the genus include:

- Isanthus capensis Carlgren, 1938
- Isanthus homolophilus Chintiroglu & Doumenc, 1998
