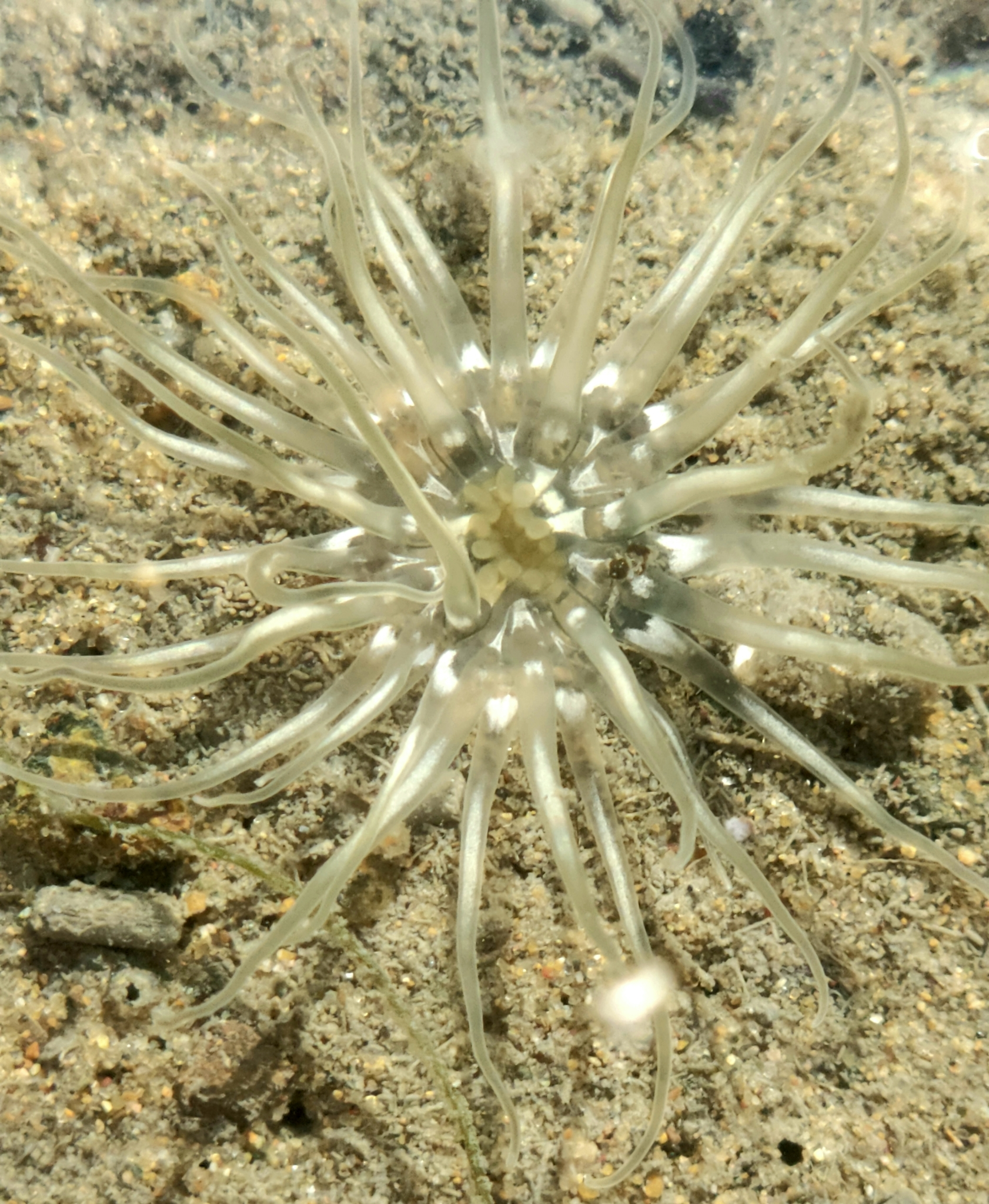
- Zaolutus actius

Scientific classification
- Kingdom: Animalia
- Phylum: Cnidaria
- Subphylum: Anthozoa
- Class: Hexacorallia
- Order: Actiniaria
- Superfamily: Metridioidea
- Family: Isanthidae; Carlgren, 1938

Genera
- See text

= Isanthidae =

Family of sea anemones

Isanthidae is a small family of sea anemones in the class Anthozoa.

== Genera ==
The following genera are recognized:

- Anthoparactis Häussermann & Rodríguez, 2014
- Austroneophellia Zamponi, 1978
- Cnidanthea
- Eltaninactis Dunn, 1983
- Isanthus
- Neophellia
- Paraisanthus Sanamyan & Sanamyan, 1998
- Zaolutus
