= Ptychodactis =

Scientific classification
- Domain: Eukaryota
- Kingdom: Animalia
- Phylum: Cnidaria
- Subphylum: Anthozoa
- Class: Hexacorallia
- Order: Actiniaria
- Family: Ptychodactinidae; Appellöf, 1893
- Genus: Ptychodactis; Appellöf, 1893

Synonyms
- List (Family): Ptychodacteae; Ptychodactiidae Appellöf, 1893; (Genus): Phychodactis

Genus of sea anemones

Ptychodactis is a genus of sea anemones. It is the only genus in the monotypic family Ptychodactinidae.

== Species ==
There are two species recognized in the genus:

- Ptychodactis aleutiensis Eash-Loucks, Jewett, Fautin, Hoberg & Chenelot, 2010
- Ptychodactis patula Appellöf, 1893
