= Ptychodactis patula =

Scientific classification
- Domain: Eukaryota
- Kingdom: Animalia
- Phylum: Cnidaria
- Subphylum: Anthozoa
- Class: Hexacorallia
- Order: Actiniaria
- Family: Ptychodactinidae
- Genus: Ptychodactis
- Species: P. patula

Binomial name
- Ptychodactis patula Appellöf, 1893

Species of sea anemone

Ptychodactis patula is a species of sea anemone. It occurs in the Arctic and northern Atlantic oceans.
