= Ptychodactis aleutiensis =

Scientific classification
- Domain: Eukaryota
- Kingdom: Animalia
- Phylum: Cnidaria
- Subphylum: Anthozoa
- Class: Hexacorallia
- Order: Actiniaria
- Family: Ptychodactinidae
- Genus: Ptychodactis
- Species: P. aleutiensis

Binomial name
- Ptychodactis aleutiensis Eash-Loucks, Jewett, Fautin, Hoberg & Chenelot, 2010

Species of sea anemone

Ptychodactis aleutiensis is a species of sea anemone found off the Aleutian Islands, Alaska.
