= Acricoactis =

Scientific classification
- Domain: Eukaryota
- Kingdom: Animalia
- Phylum: Cnidaria
- Class: Hexacorallia
- Order: Actiniaria
- Family: Acricoactinidae
- Genus: Acricoactis; Larson, 2016
- Species: A. brachyacontis

Binomial name
- Acricoactis brachyacontis Larson, 2016

Genus of sea anemones

Acricoactis is a genus of sea anemones of the family Acricoactinidae. It currently includes only one species.

== Species ==
The following species are recognized:

- Acricoactis brachyacontis Larson, 2016

== Distribution ==
This species was described from Alaska.
