= Acricoactinidae =

Scientific classification
- Kingdom: Animalia
- Phylum: Cnidaria
- Subphylum: Anthozoa
- Class: Hexacorallia
- Order: Actiniaria
- Superfamily: Metridioidea
- Family: Acricoactinidae; Larson, 2016

Family of sea anemones

Acricoactinidae is a family of sea anemones. It currently includes only one species.

== Genera ==
The following genera are recognized:

- Acricoactis Larson, 2016
