= Charisella =

Charisella may refer to:

- Charisella, a genus of fishes in the family Melanotaeniidae, synonym of Melanotaenia
- Charisella, a genus of cnidarians in the family Condylanthidae, synonym of Cadetactis
