= Cadetactis =

Scientific classification
- Kingdom: Animalia
- Phylum: Cnidaria
- Subphylum: Anthozoa
- Class: Hexacorallia
- Order: Actiniaria
- Family: Condylanthidae
- Genus: Cadetactis; Fautin, 2016
- Species: C. elongata

Binomial name
- Cadetactis elongata (Carlgren, 1950)

Synonyms
- Charisella Carlgren, 1950

Genus of sea anemones

Cadetactis is a monotypic genus of cnidarians belonging to the family Condylanthidae. The only species is Cadetactis elongata.
