= List of cnidarians of Ireland =

There are 302 species of cnidarians (phylum Cnidaria) recorded in Ireland.

The cnidarians' distinguishing feature is cnidocytes, specialized cells that they use mainly for capturing prey. Their bodies consist of mesoglea, a non-living jelly-like substance, sandwiched between two layers of epithelium that are mostly one cell thick. They have two basic body forms: swimming medusae and sessile polyps, both of which are radially symmetrical with mouths surrounded by tentacles that bear cnidocytes. Both forms have a single orifice and body cavity that are used for digestion and respiration. Many cnidarian species produce colonies that are single organisms composed of medusa-like or polyp-like zooids, or both (hence they are trimorphic).

Cnidarians found in Ireland and Irish waters include sea pens, sea anemones, hydroids, sea jellies ("jellyfish") and corals.

== Class Anthozoa ==
=== Order Actiniaria (sea anemones) ===
==== Family Actiniidae ====
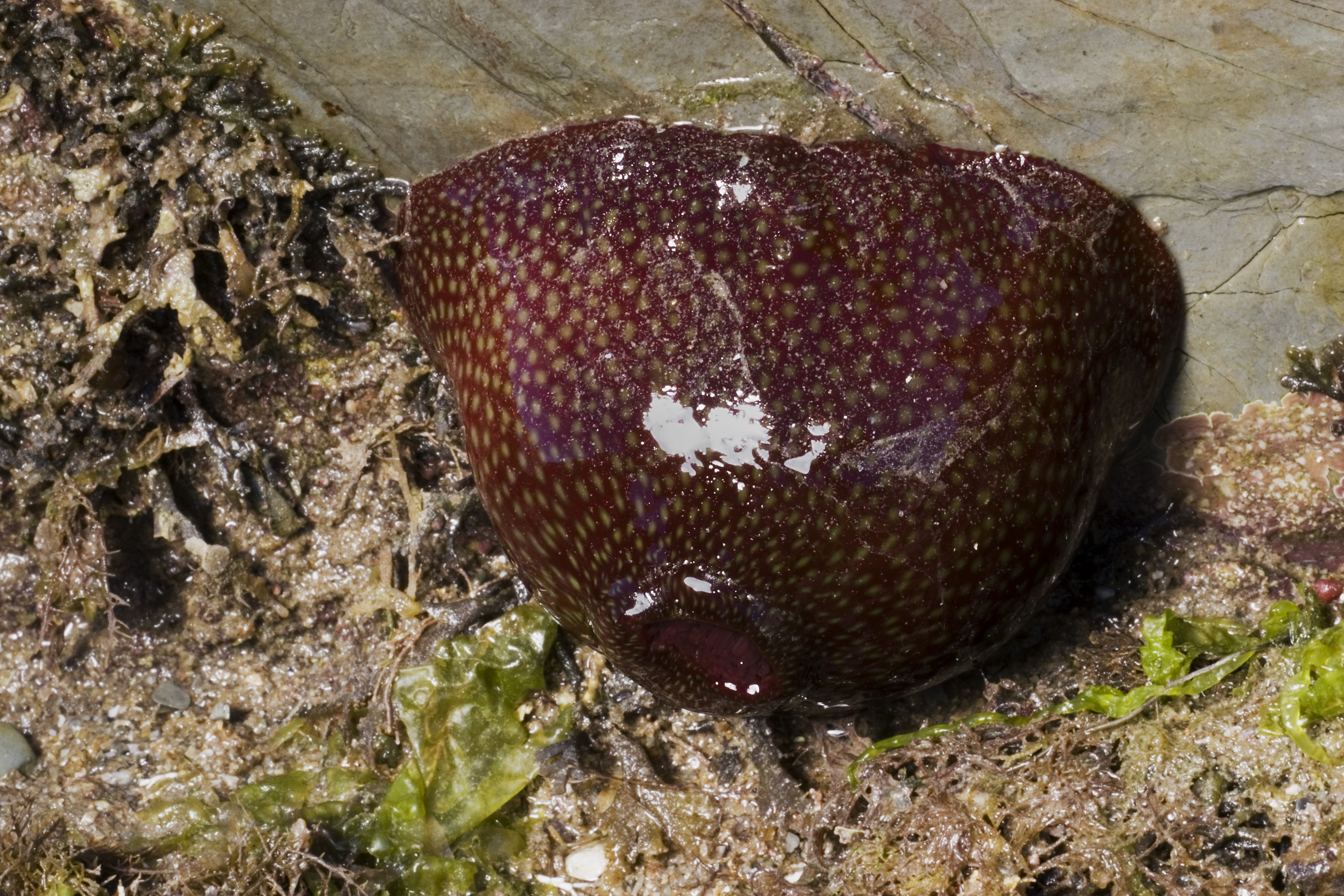
Actinia fragacea (strawberry anemone)

- Actinia equina (beadlet anemone)
- Actinia fragacea (strawberry anemone)
- Anemonia viridis (snakelocks anemone)
- Anthopleura ballii (red speckled anemone)
- Aulactinia verrucosa (gem anemone)
- Urticina eques
- Urticina felina (northern red anemones, dahlia anemone)

==== Family Actinostolidae ====
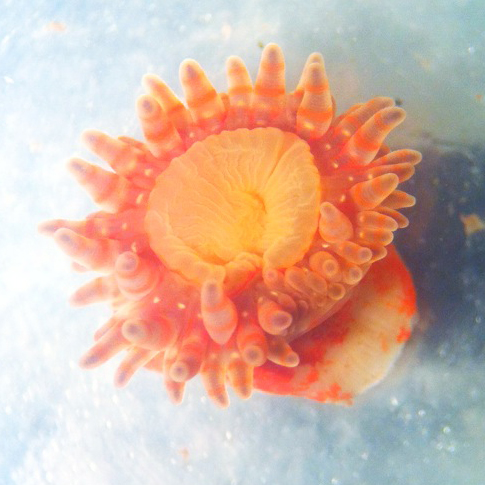
Stomphia coccinea

- Stomphia coccinea

==== Family Aiptasiidae ====
- Aiptasia mutabilis

==== Family Capneidae ====
- Capnea sanguinea

==== Family Edwardsiidae ====
- Edwardsia claparedii
- Edwardsia delapiae
- Edwardsia timida (timid burrowing anemone)
- Edwardsiella carnea
- Scolanthus callimorphus

==== Family Gonactiniidae ====
- Gonactinia prolifera

==== Family Halcampidae ====
- Halcampa chrysanthellum

==== Family Halcampoididae ====
- Halcampoides elongatus

==== Family Haloclavidae ====
- Mesacmaea mitchellii
- Peachia cylindrica

==== Family Hormathiidae ====
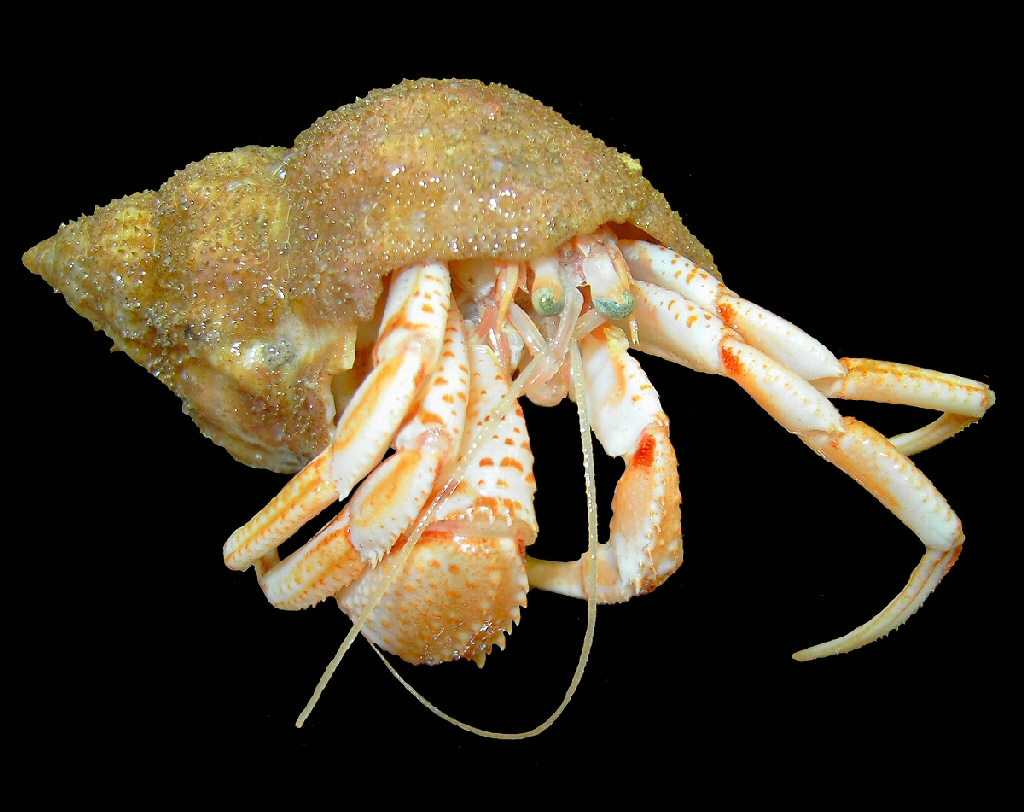
Calliactis parasitica living on the shell of a common whelk, occupied by soldier crab.

- Adamsia carciniopados
- Adamsia palliata (cloak anemone)
- Calliactis parasitica
- Cataphellia brodricii
- Hormathia coronata

==== Family Metridiidae ====
- Metridium senile (plumose anemone, frilled anemone)

==== Family Sagartiidae ====
- Actinothoe sphyrodeta
- Cereus pedunculatus (daisy anemone)
- Phellia gausapata
- Sagartia elegans
- Sagartia ornata
- Sagartia troglodytes (mud sagartia, cave-dwelling anemone)
- Sagartiogeton laceratus
- Sagartiogeton undatus

=== Order Alcyonacea (soft corals) ===
==== Family Alcyoniidae ====
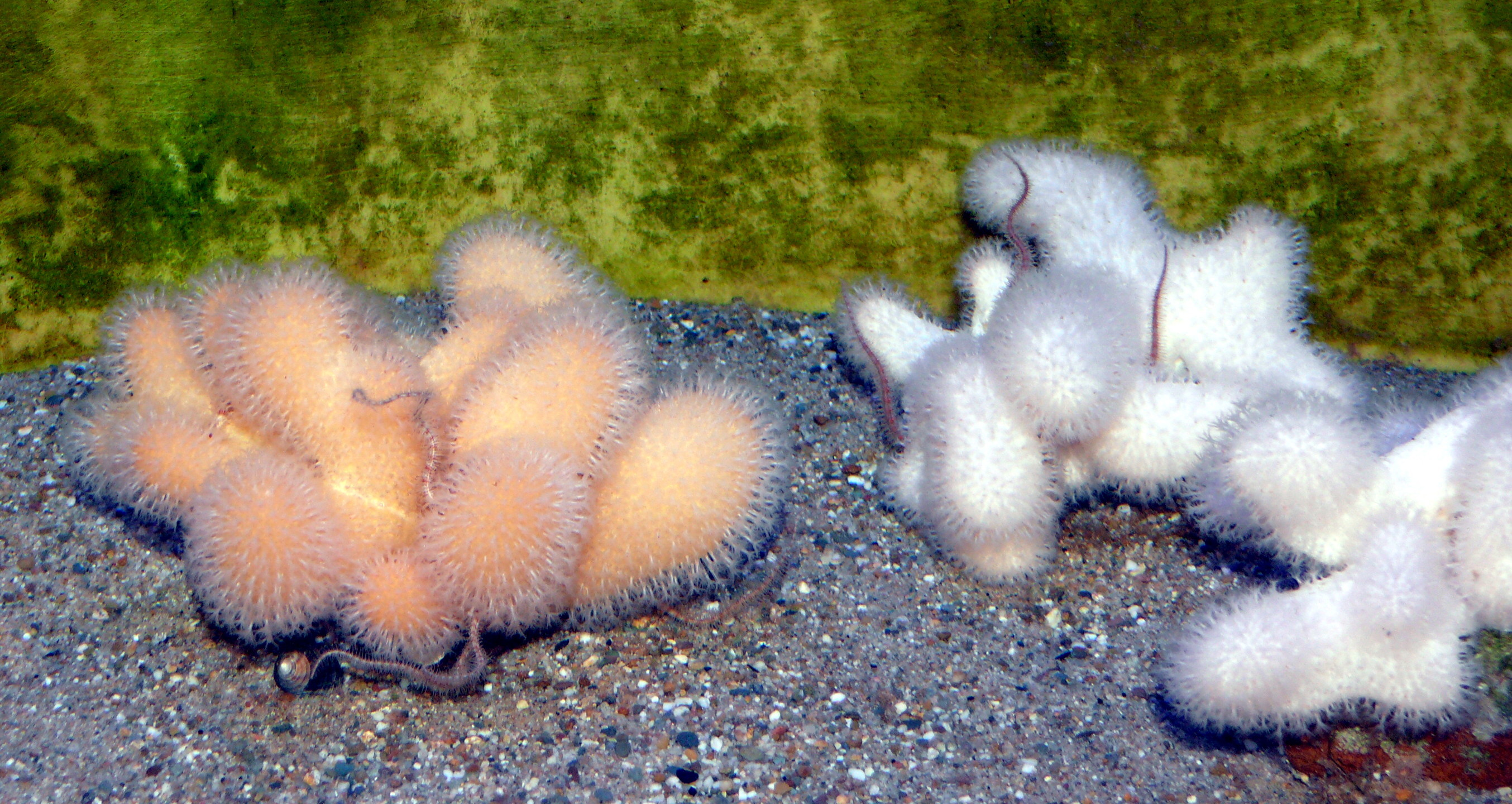
Alcyonium digitatum (dead man's fingers)

- Alcyonium digitatum (dead man's fingers)
- Alcyonium glomeratum (red sea fingers)
- Alcyonium hibernicum (pink sea fingers)
- Parerythropodium coralloides

==== Family Gorgoniidae ====
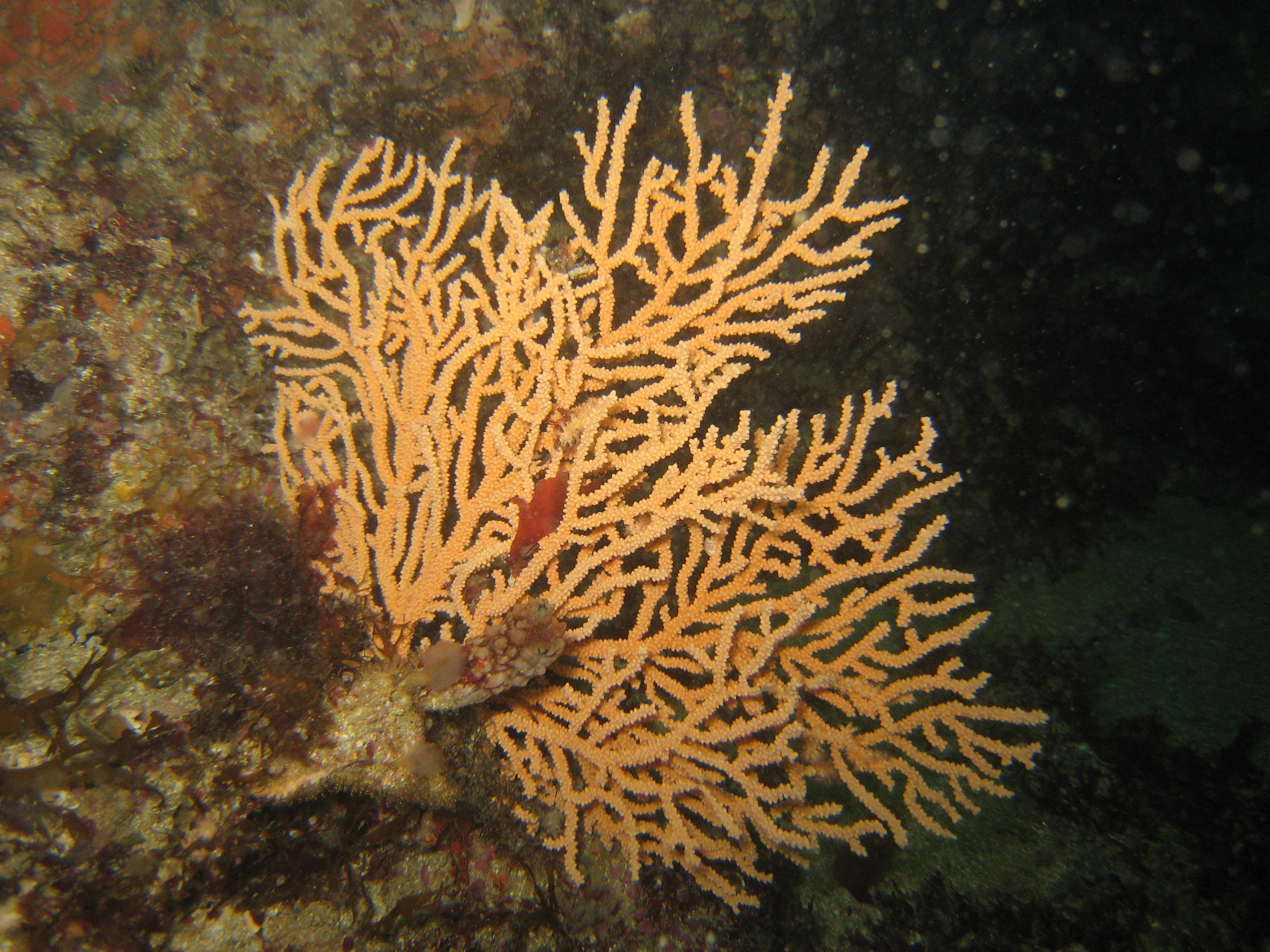
Eunicella verrucosa

- Eunicella verrucosa (broad sea fan, pink sea fan, warty gorgonian)

==== Family Plexauridae ====
- Swiftia pallida (northern sea fan)

=== Order Ceriantharia (tube-dwelling anemone) ===
==== Family Arachnactidae ====
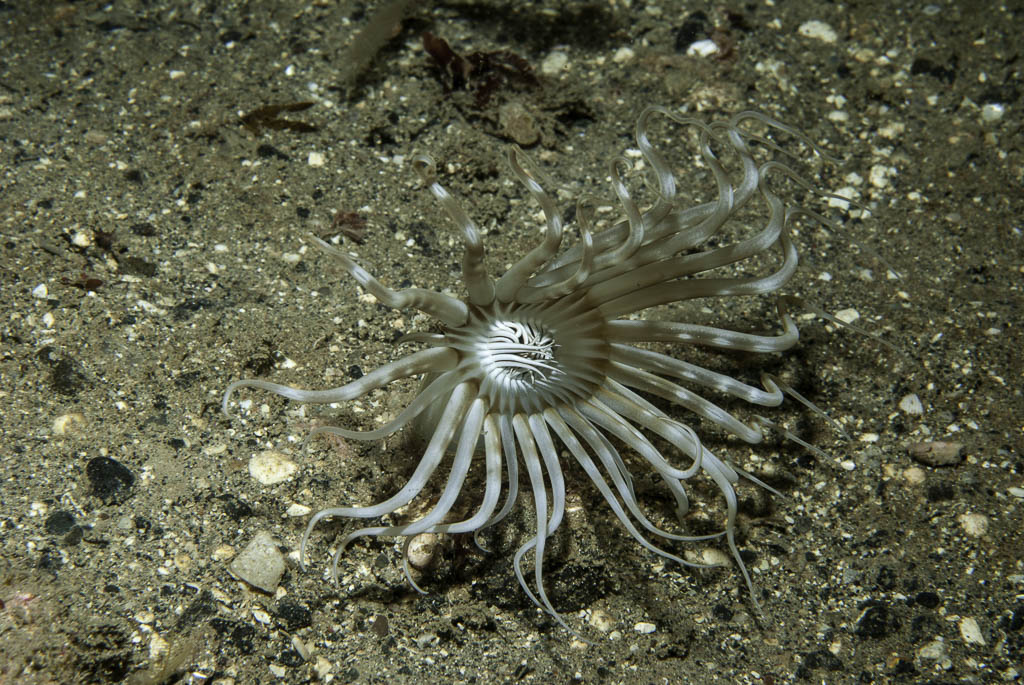
Arachnanthus sarsi, photographed off Rathlin Island

- Arachnanthus sarsi

==== Family Cerianthidae ====
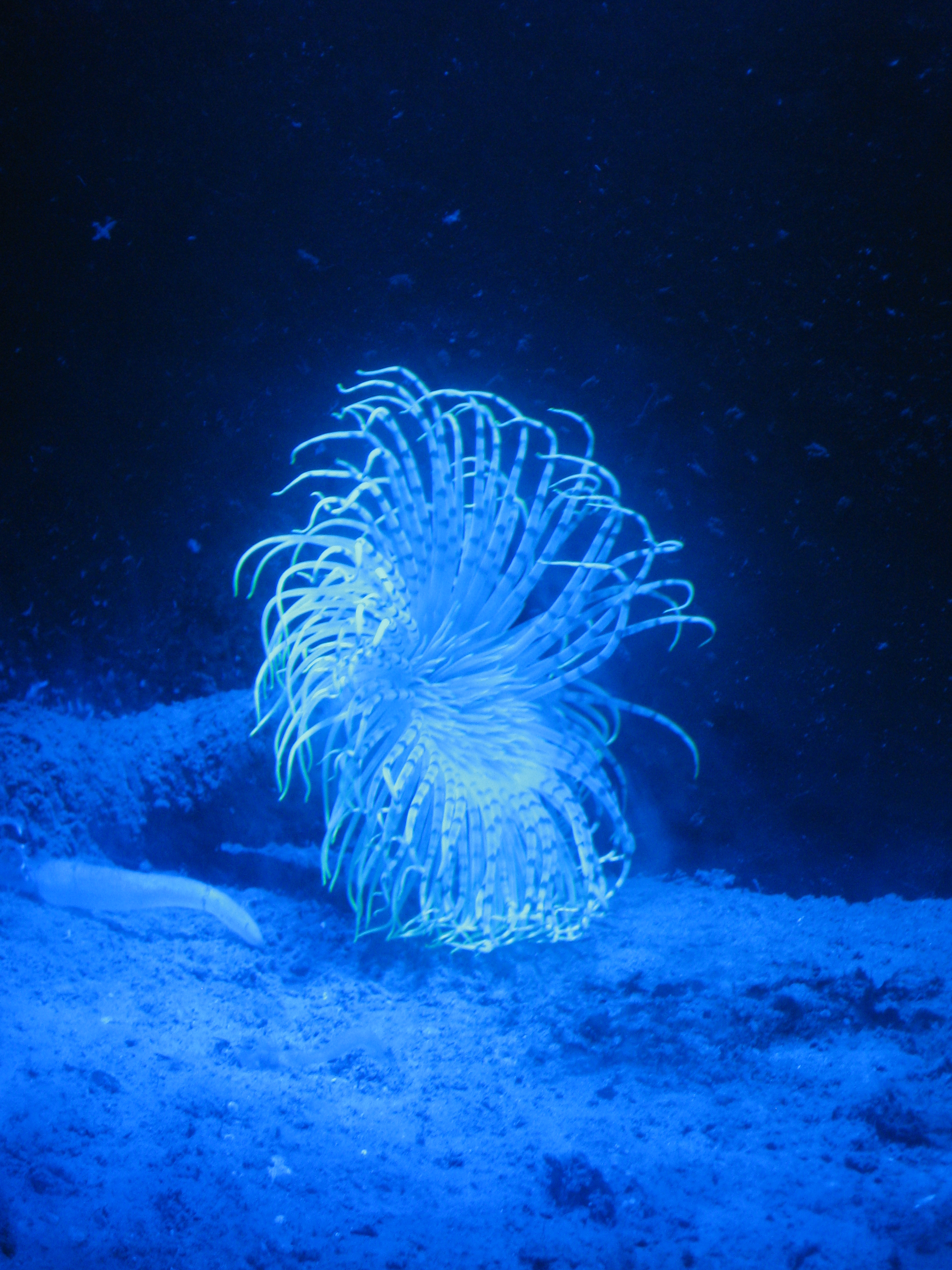
Pachycerianthus multiplicatus (firework anemone)

- Cerianthus lloydii (lesser cylinder anemone)
- Pachycerianthus multiplicatus (firework anemone)

=== Order Corallimorpharia ===
==== Family Corallimorphidae ====
- Corynactis viridis

=== Order Pennatulacea (sea pens) ===
==== Family Virgulariidae ====
- Virgularia mirabilis

=== Order Zoantharia ===
==== Family Epizoanthidae ====
- Epizoanthus couchii

==== Family Parazoanthidae ====
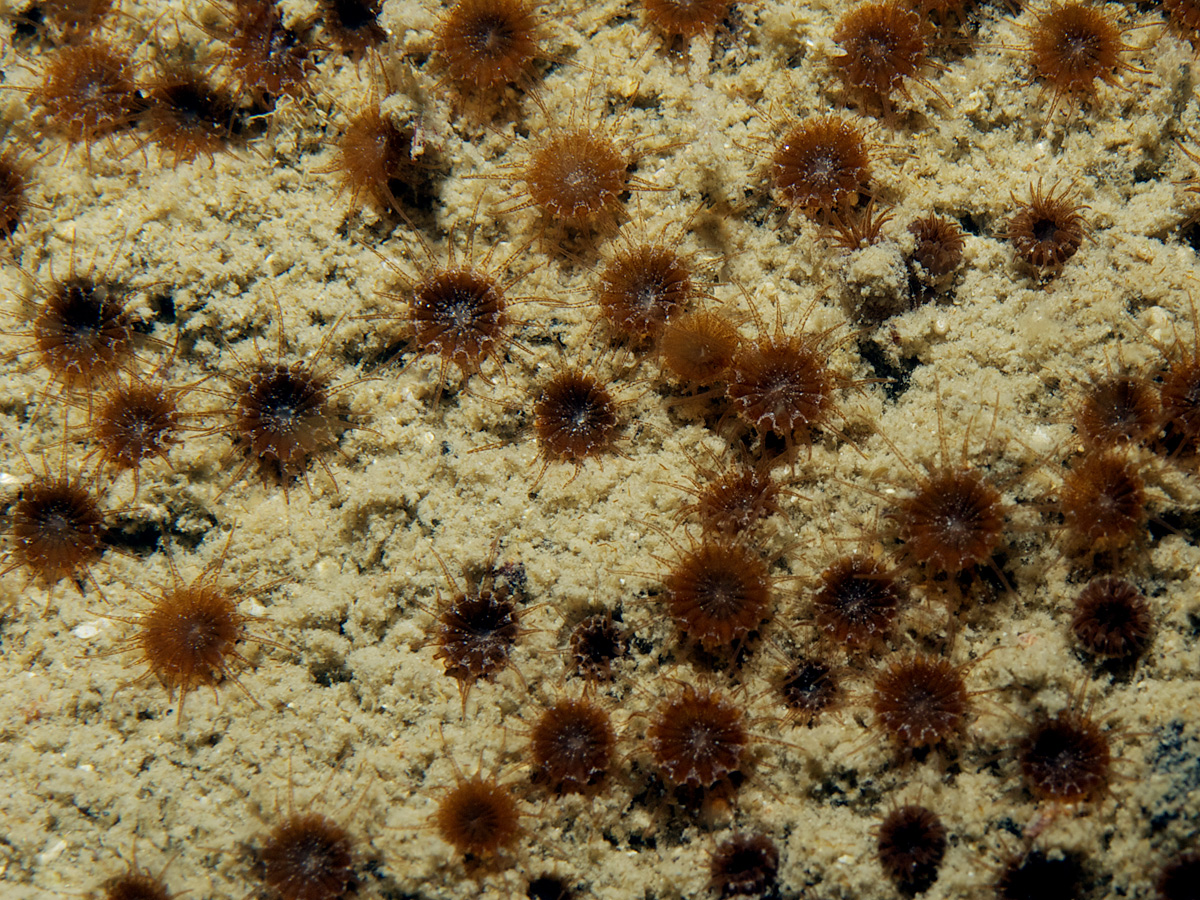
Isozoanthus sulcatus in Lough Hyne

- Isozoanthus sulcatus
- Parazoanthus anguicomus
- Parazoanthus axinellae (yellow cluster anemone)

== Class Hydrozoa ==
=== Order Anthoathecata (athecate hydroids) ===
==== Family Bougainvilliidae ====
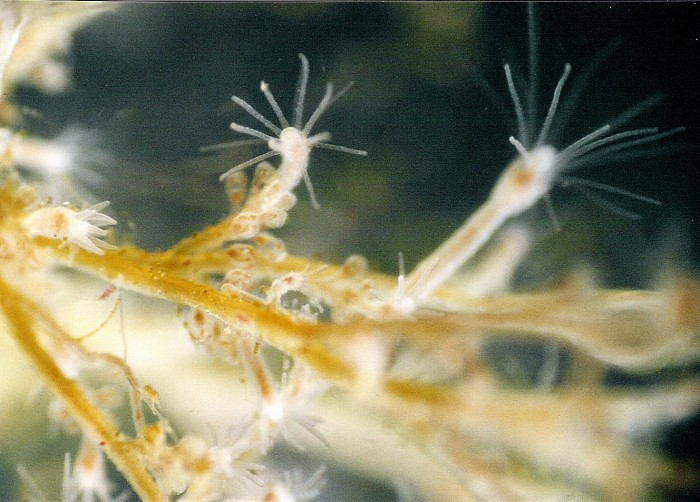
Bougainvillia muscus

- Bougainvillia muscus
- Garveia nutans

==== Family Candelabridae ====
- Candelabrum phrygium

==== Family Corymorphidae ====
- Corymorpha nutans

==== Family Corynidae ====
- Coryne eximia
- Coryne muscoides
- Sarsia densa

==== Family Eudendriidae ====
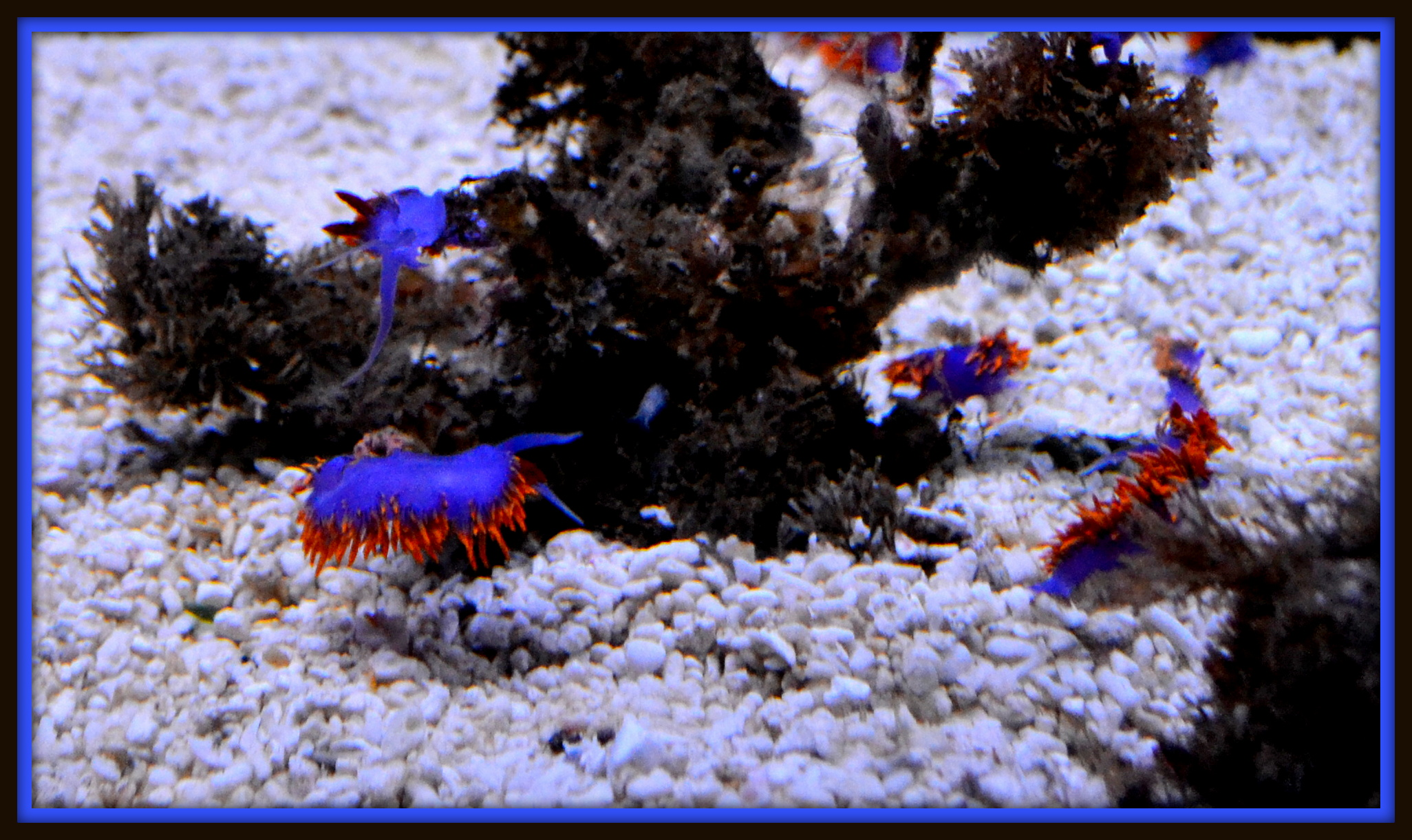
Spanish shawl feeding on Eudendrium ramosum

- Eudendrium annulatum
- Eudendrium arbuscula
- Eudendrium ramosum

==== Family Hydractiniidae ====
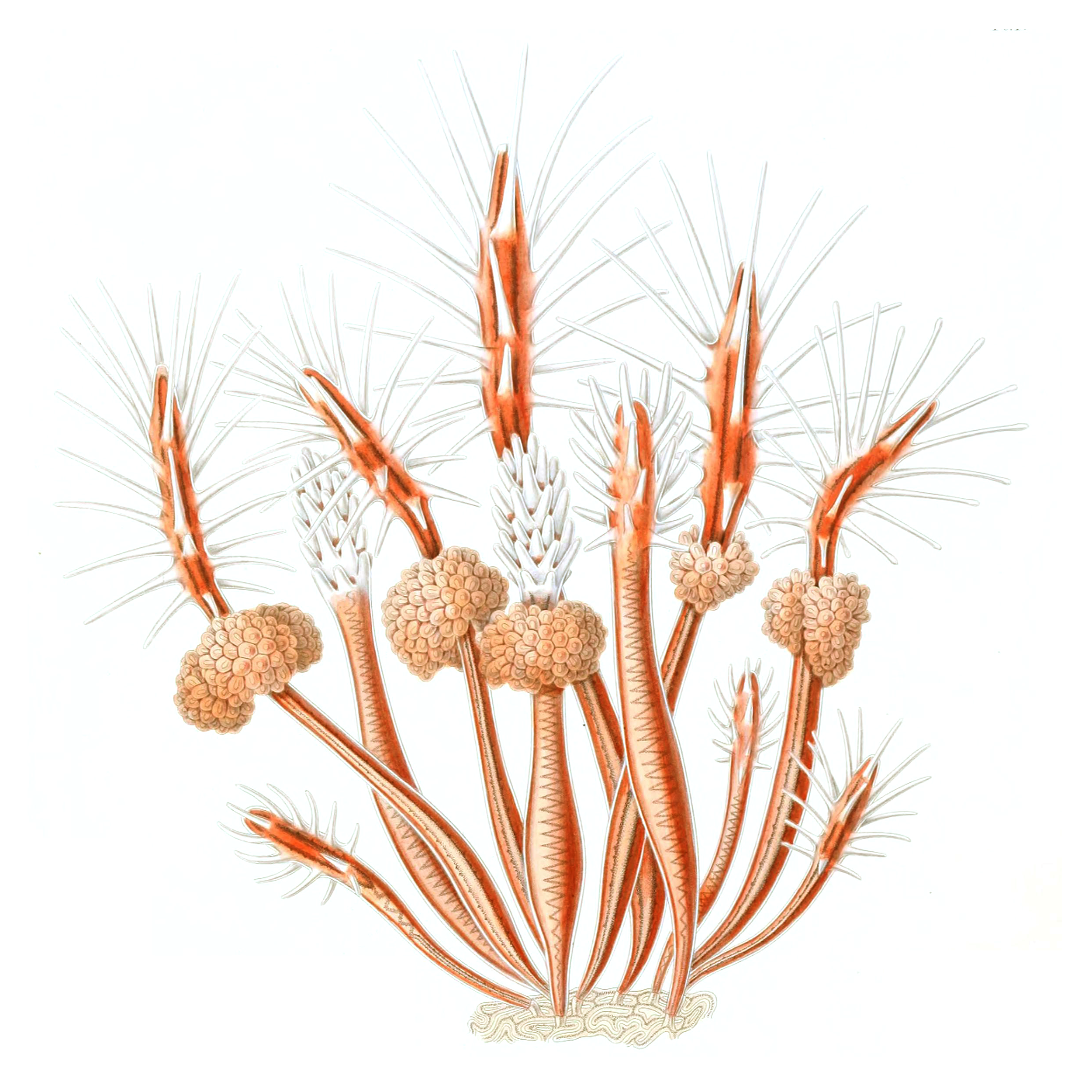
Clava multicornis

- Clava multicornis
- Hydractinia echinata (snail fur)

==== Family Hydridae (hydras) ====
- Hydra viridissima (green hydra)
- Hydra vulgaris (common hydra)

==== Family Pandeiidae ====
- Leuckartiara octona
- Neoturris pileata

==== Family Porpitidae (chondrophores) ====
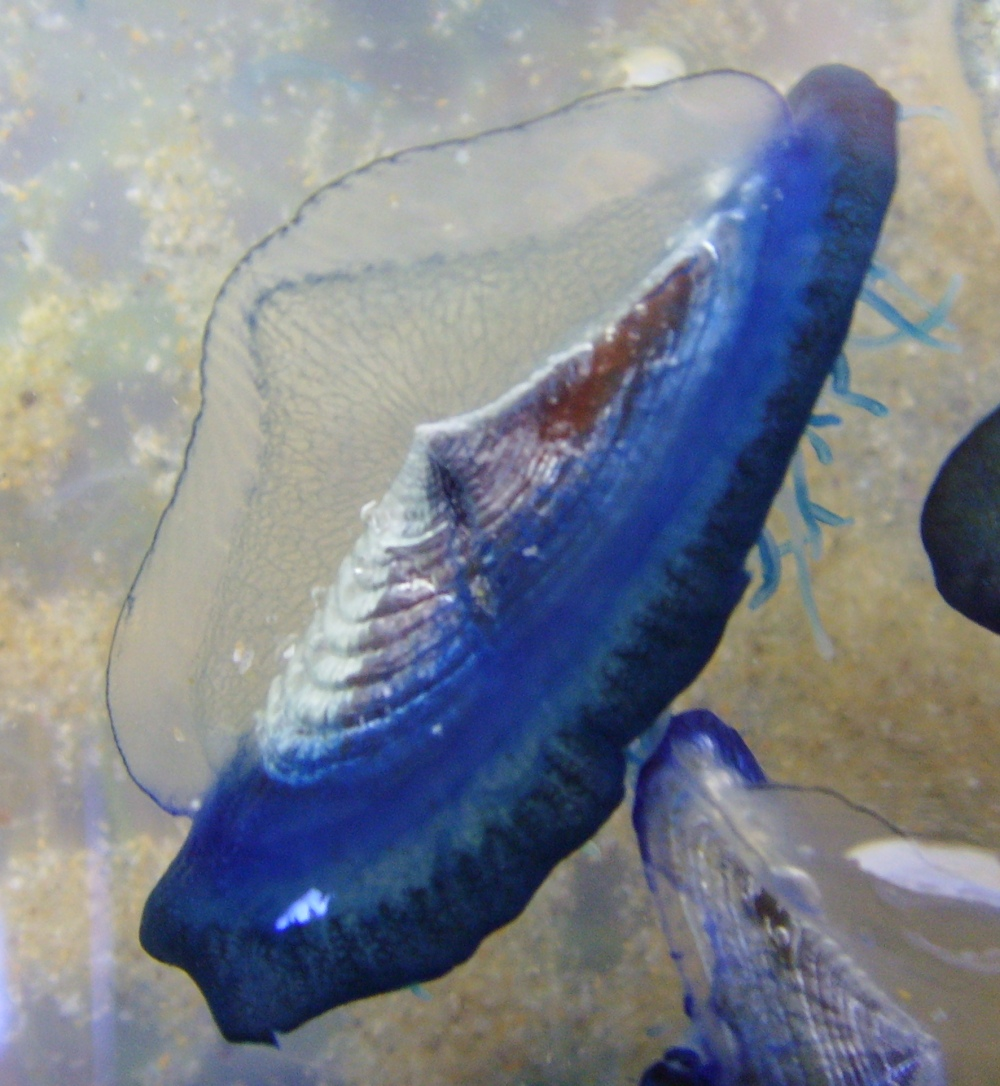
Velella velella colony

- Velella velella (sea raft, by-the-wind sailor, purple sail, little sail)

==== Family Tubulariidae ====
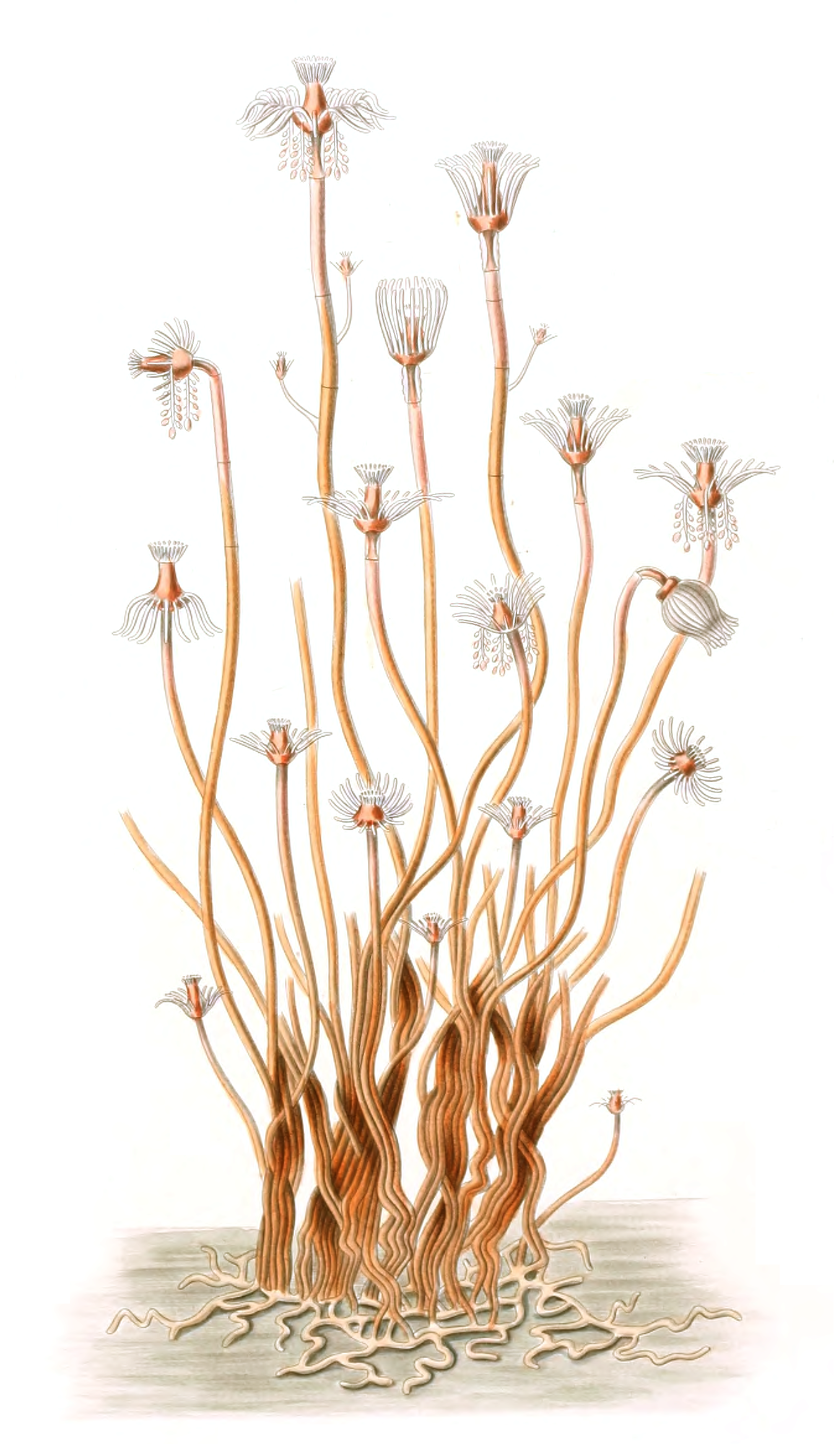
Tubularia indivisa (oaten pipes hydroid)

- Ectopleura larynx
- Tubularia indivisa (oaten pipes hydroid)

=== Order Leptomedusae (thecate hydroids) ===
==== Family Aequoreidae ====
- Aequorea forskalea
- Aequorea vitrina

==== Family Aglaopheniidae ====
- Aglaophenia acacia
- Aglaophenia kirchenpaueri
- Aglaophenia pluma (toothed feather hydroid, podded hydroid)
- Aglaophenia tubiformis
- Aglaophenia tubulifera
- Gymnangium montagui
- Lytocarpia myriophyllum

==== Family Campanulariidae ====
- Campanularia hincksii
- Clytia hemisphaerica
- Laomedea angulata
- Laomedea flexuosa
- Obelia dichotoma
- Obelia geniculata
- Obelia longissima
- Obelia plicata
- Rhizocaulus verticillatus

==== Family Haleciidae ====
- Halecium beanii
- Halecium halecinum
- Halecium muricatum
- Halecium plumosum

==== Family Halopterididae ====
- Antennella secundaria
- Halopteris catharina
- Schizotricha frutescens

==== Family Kirchenpaueriidae ====
- Kirchenpaueria pinnata

==== Family Lafoeidae ====
- Lafoea dumosa

==== Family Plumulariidae ====
- Nemertesia antennina
- Nemertesia ramosa
- Plumularia argentea
- Plumularia cupressina
- Plumularia distans
- Plumularia setacea (plumed hydroid, little sea bristle)
- Polyplumaria flabellata

==== Family Sertulariidae ====
- Abietinaria abietina
- Abietinaria filicula
- Amphisbetia operculata
- Diphasia alata
- Diphasia attenuata
- Diphasia fallax
- Diphasia nigra
- Diphasia pinaster
- Diphasia rosacea
- Dynamena pumila
- Hydrallmania falcata
- Sertularella fusiformis
- Sertularella gayi
- Sertularella mediterranea
- Sertularella polyzonias
- Sertularella rugosa
- Tamarisca tamarisca
- Thuiaria articulata (jointed hydroid)
- Thuiaria thuja

=== Order Limnomedusae ===
==== Family Olindiidae ====
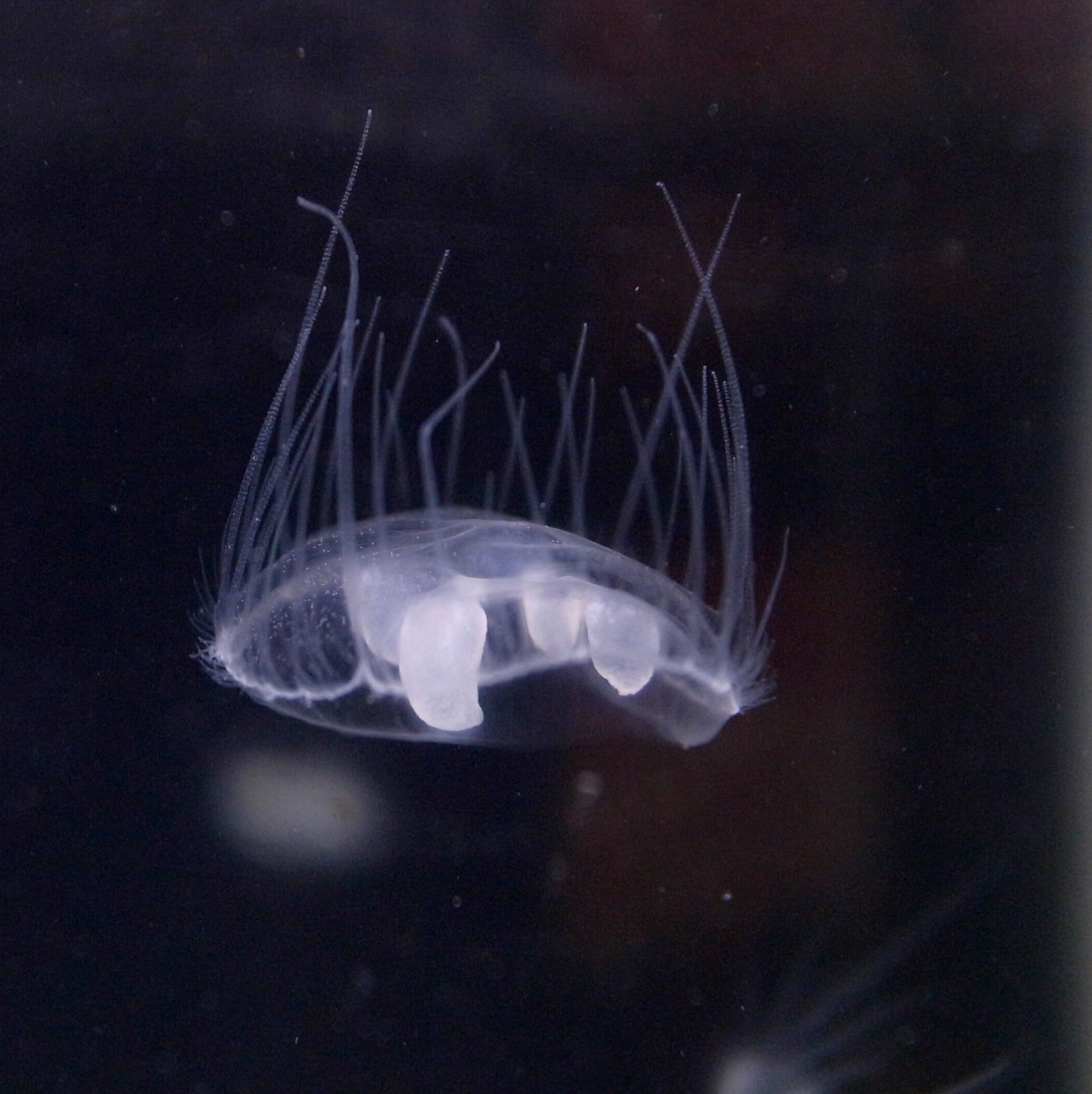
Craspedacusta sowerbii

- Craspedacusta sowerbii

=== Order Siphonophorae (siphonophores) ===
==== Family Apolemiidae ====
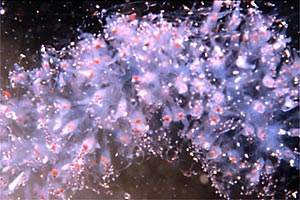
Apolemia uvaria (string jellyfish)

- Apolemia uvaria (string jellyfish, barbed wire jellyfish, long stringy stingy thingy)

==== Family Physaliidae ====
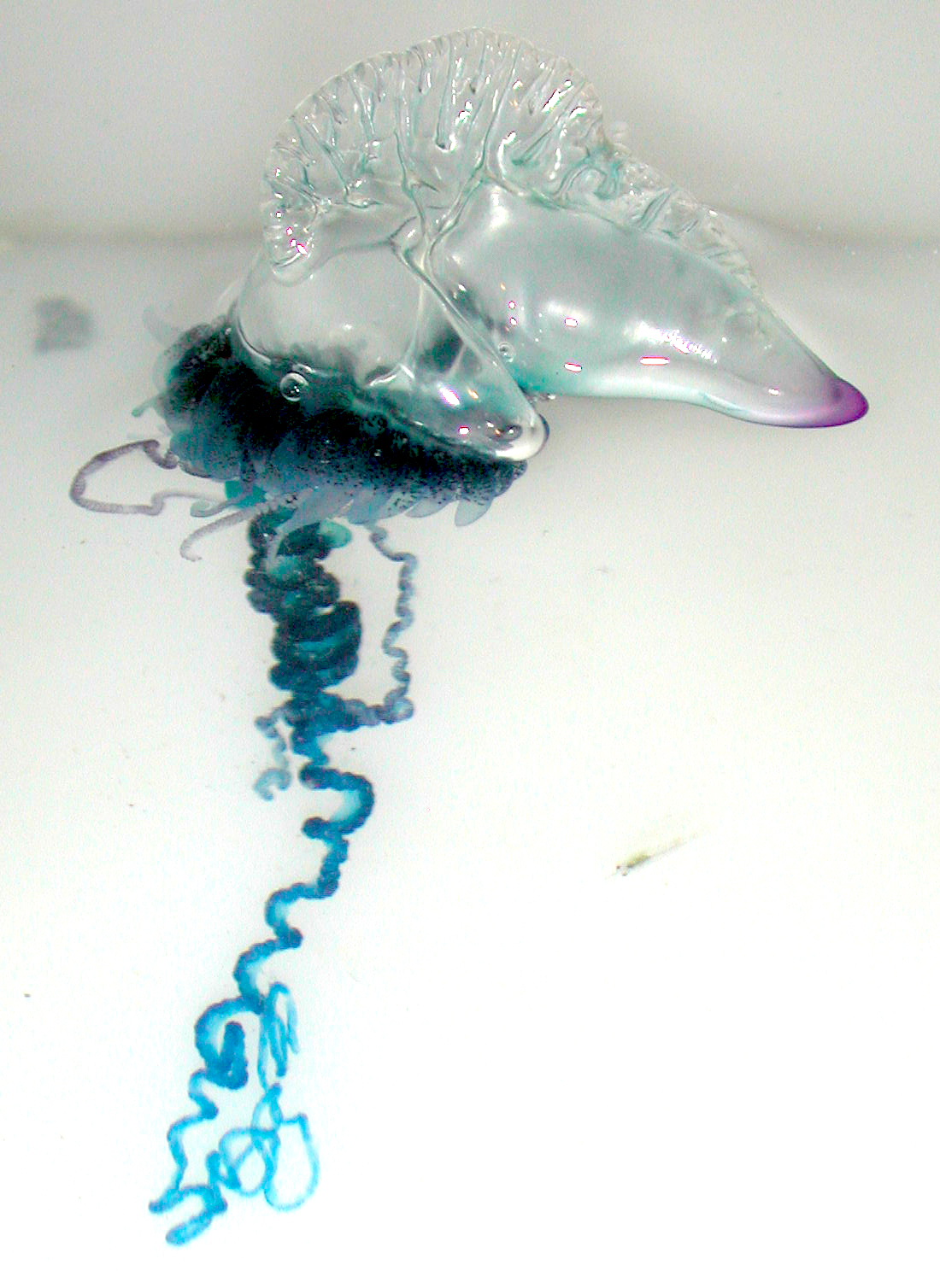
Portuguese man-o'-war

- Physalia physalis (Portuguese man-o'-war, blue bottle, floating terror)

== Class Scyphozoa (true sea jellies) ==
=== Order Rhizostomeae ===
==== Family Rhizostomatidae ====
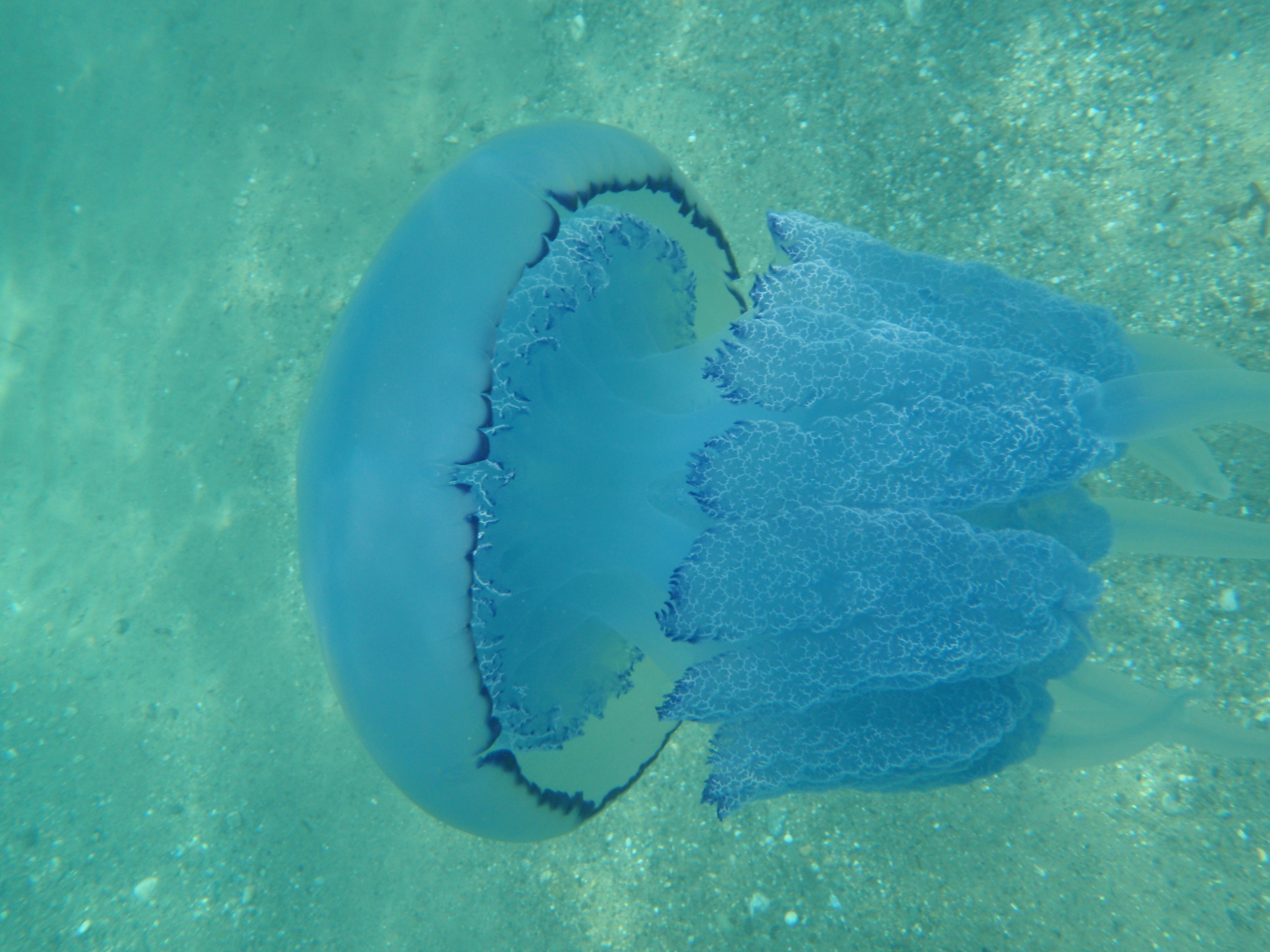
Rhizostoma pulmo

- Rhizostoma pulmo (barrel jelly, dustbin-lid jelly, frilly-mouthed jelly)

=== Order Semaeostomeae (flag-mouth sea jellies) ===
==== Family Cyaneidae ====
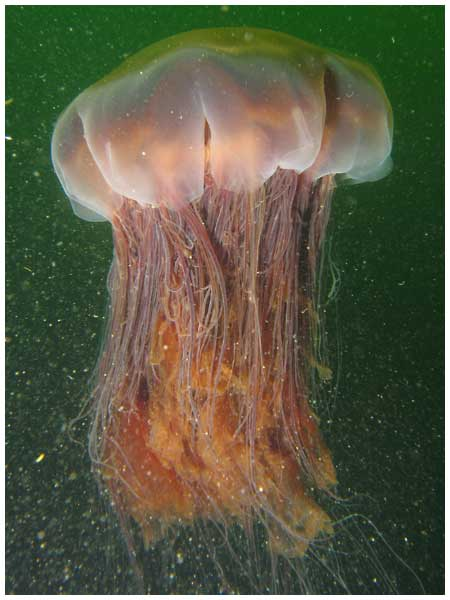
Cyanea capillata (lion's mane jelly)

- Cyanea capillata (lion's mane jelly)
- Cyanea lamarckii (blue jelly, bluefire)

==== Family Pelagiidae ====
- Chrysaora hysoscella (compass jelly)
- Pelagia noctiluca (mauve stinger)

==== Family Ulmaridae ====
- Aurelia aurita (moon jelly, common jelly, saucer jelly)

=== Order Scleractinia (stony corals, hard corals) ===
==== Family Caryophylliidae ====
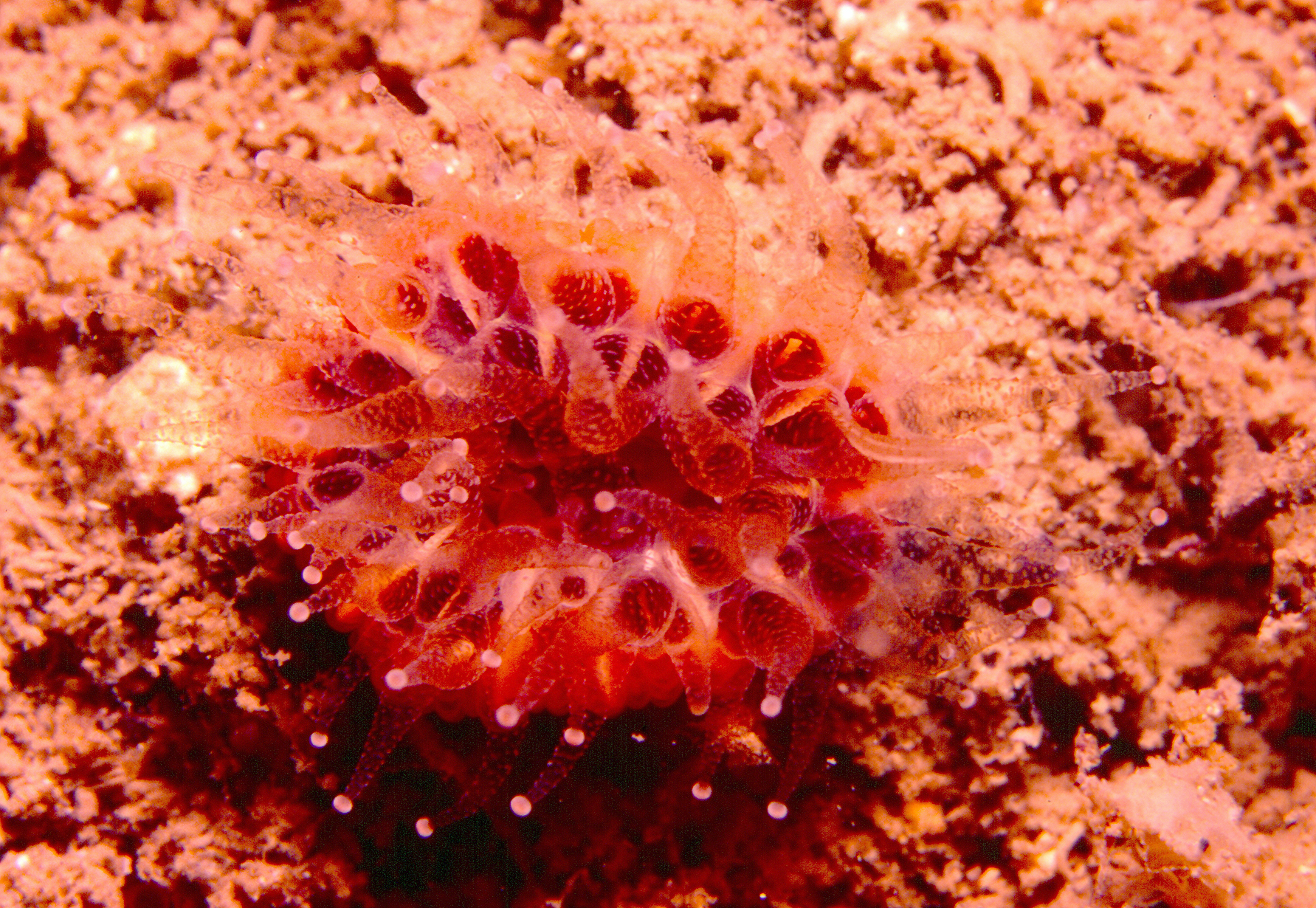
Caryophyllia smithii

- Caryophyllia inornata
- Caryophyllia smithii (Devonshire cup coral)
- Lophelia pertusa

==== Family Oculinidae ====
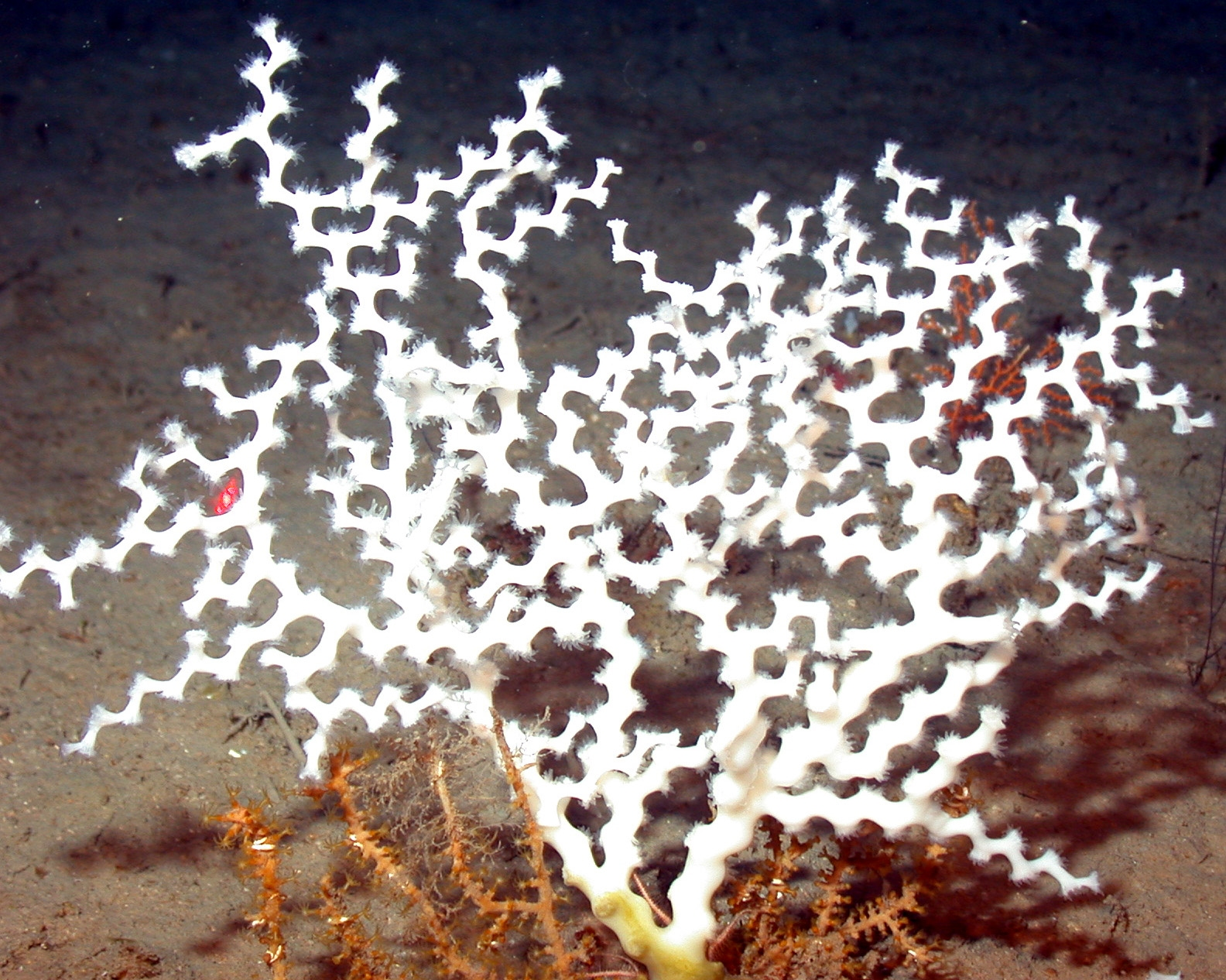
Zigzag coral

- Madrepora oculata (zigzag coral)

== Class Staurozoa ==
=== Order Stauromedusae (stalked jellies) ===
==== Family Craterolophidae ====
- Craterolophus convolvulus

==== Family Kishinouyeidae ====
- Lucernariopsis campanulata

==== Family Lucernariidae ====
- Haliclystus auricula (kaleidoscope jelly)
