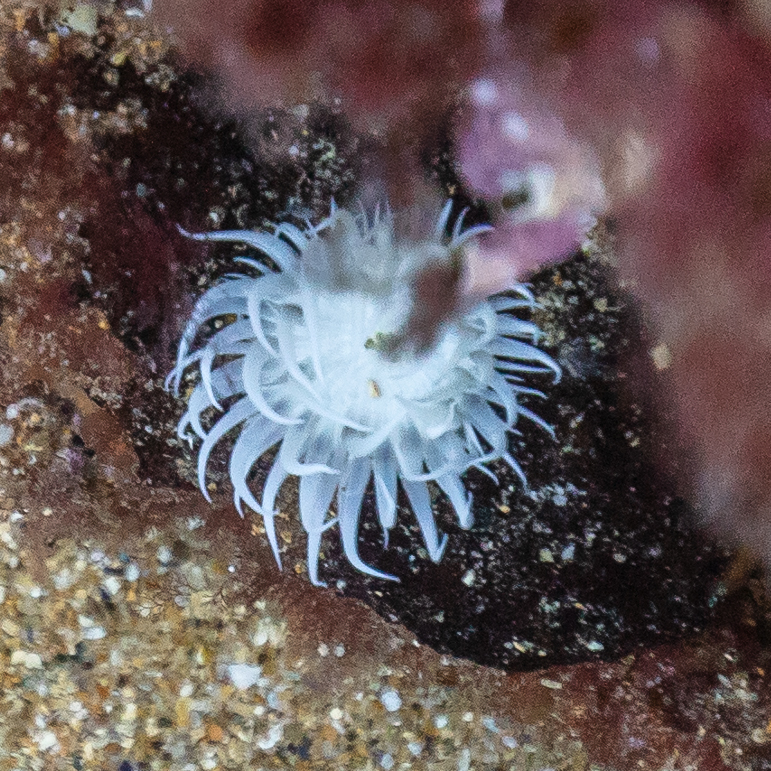
- In Santander (Spain)

Conservation status
- Data Deficient (IUCN 3.1) (Mediterranean)

Scientific classification
- Kingdom: Animalia
- Phylum: Cnidaria
- Subphylum: Anthozoa
- Class: Hexacorallia
- Order: Actiniaria
- Family: Sagartiidae
- Genus: Actinothoe
- Species: A. sphyrodeta

Binomial name
- Actinothoe sphyrodeta (Gosse, 1858)

Synonyms
- List: Actinia candida Gosse, 1853; Sagartia candida; Sagartia sphyrodeta Gosse, 1858; Sagartia sphyrodita; Thoe sphyrodeta (Gosse, 1858)

= Actinothoe sphyrodeta =

Species of sea anemone

Actinothoe sphyrodeta, the sandalled anemone, is a small sea anemone in the family Sagartiidae. It is native to the northeastern Atlantic Ocean and is common on the north, west and south coasts of Britain. It is usually grey or whitish but may have an orange oral disc. The translucent white tentacles that grow around the edge of the oral disc can number up to 120.

== Description ==
Actinothoe sphyrodeta is a small, delicate sea anemone. The base can grow to a diameter of about 1 cm (0.4 in) and the anemone often appears plump and squat, but the column can be extended to a length of 3 cm (1.2 in), and the oral disc expanded to a diameter of 2 cm (0.8 in). The column is smooth, and has a number of cinclides, which appear as dark slits on the upper part of the column, but no adhesive suckers. Five whorls of up to 120 irregularly arranged, moderately long tentacles grow at the edge of the oral disc. Acontia (stinging threads) from the gastrovascular cavity can readily be extruded from the mouth which is at the centre of the oral disc. The column is pale grey, the oral disc is white or orange and the tentacles are white with grey bases. This sea anemone can be distinguished from similarly coloured forms of Sagartia elegans by the presence of longitudinal white striations on the column and the absence of suckers.

== Distribution and habitat ==
Actinothoe sphyrodeta is common around the British Isles, and is found on the Atlantic coast of France. Around the coast of the British Isles, it is common in the north, west and south, and around Ireland, but uncommon on the east coast of Scotland and England. Its northern limit is likely to be the southern part of the North Sea and is found at least as far south as the Bay of Biscay. It occurs in caves and under overhangs, on rock walls, and on brown seaweeds such as Laminaria fronds and Himanthalia elongata buttons. It can occasionally be seen on the lower shore but it is mostly a sublittoral species, inhabiting depths down to about 50 m (164 ft).

== Ecology ==
Actinothoe sphyrodeta reproduces by longitudinal fission. The base lengthens in one plane, the two halves of the base move apart and the tissue between them tears; often base and oral disc rupture first. The two resulting fragments may be of unequal size but both normally have part of the base, throat, oral disc and ring of tentacles. The wounds heal and two new individuals are formed. This sea anemone is often found living in association with the jewel anemone (Corynactis viridis), and the Devonshire cup coral (Caryophyllia smithii).
