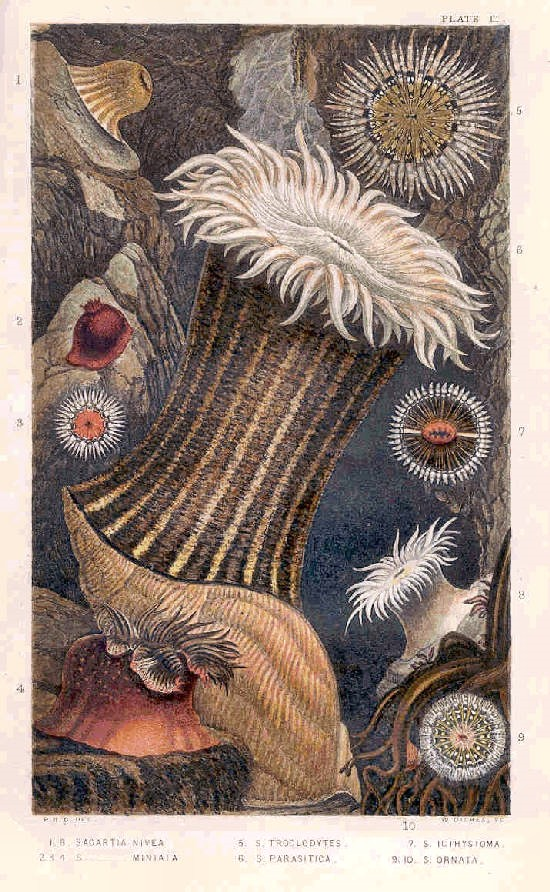
- Several species of Sagartia with S. ichthystoma at centre right.

Scientific classification
- Kingdom: Animalia
- Phylum: Cnidaria
- Subphylum: Anthozoa
- Class: Hexacorallia
- Order: Actiniaria
- Family: Sagartiidae
- Genus: Sagartia
- Species: S. ichthystoma

Binomial name
- Sagartia ichthystoma (Gosse, 1858)

Synonyms
- Sagartia ichthyostoma; Sagartia ichtystoma

= Sagartia ichthystoma =

Species of sea anemone

Sagartia ichthystoma is a species of sea anemone in the family Sagartiidae, also known as the fish-mouth anemone. The species name refers to the short pointed tentacles round the edge of the disc which resemble the sharp teeth of certain fish.

== Description ==
The base of S. ichthystoma is usually found adhering to rocks or shells and is no wider than the column. This is cylindrical, purplish-red, and about as long as it is wide, covered with corrugations but without warts. It can retract into a nipple-shaped button. The disc is fawn and is slightly concave with an enlarged margin and clearly marked, black radii. The tentacles are translucent white with black and grey bands. They are small and conical and set in three rows which are positioned very close to the margin. The mouth is on a raised mound and the scarlet lips are wrinkled and swollen.

== Distribution and habitat ==
S. ichthystoma is found in the English Channel. The two specimens first described by Philip Henry Gosse in 1858 were found at Weymouth and Torquay, England, the first one growing on an oyster shell.

== Biology ==
Like other sea anemones, S. ichthystoma is carnivorous and feeds on small invertebrates which it catches with its tentacles and channels into its mouth. If disturbed, it can emit sticky threads called acontia, armed with nematocysts, as a defence mechanism.
