= Actinia aurora =

Actinia aurora is an unaccepted scientific name and may refer to two species of sea anemone:

- Heteractis aurora, found from the Red Sea to the eastern Pacific Ocean
- Sagartia troglodytes, the mud sagartia, found in the north-eastern Atlantic Ocean, the North Sea and the Mediterranean Sea.
