= Cereus =

Cereus, waxy in Latin, may refer to:

- Bacillus cereus, species of bacterium
- Cereus (cnidarian), a genus of sea anemones in the family Sagartiidae
- Cereus (plant), a genus of cacti (the family Cactaceae)
- Ceroid cactus, any of a number of cacti with very elongated bodies, including columnar growth cacti and epiphytic cacti
- Cereus Poker Network, an online poker network

== See also ==
- Cerea (disambiguation)
