= Actinia pedunculata =

Actinia pedunculata is an unaccepted scientific name and may refer to:

- Aulactinia verrucosa, the gem anemone
- Cereus pedunculatus, the daisy anemone
