= Lucernaria =

Scientific classification
- Domain: Eukaryota
- Kingdom: Animalia
- Phylum: Cnidaria
- Class: Staurozoa
- Order: Stauromedusae
- Family: Lucernariidae
- Genus: Lucernaria; Müller, 1776

Genus of cnidarians

Lucernaria is a genus of cnidarians belonging to the family Lucernariidae.

The species of this genus are found in Europe and America.

Species:

- Lucernaria australis Vanhöffen, 1908
- Lucernaria bathyphila Haeckel, 1880
- Lucernaria haeckeli (Antipa, 1892)
- Lucernaria infundibulum Haeckel, 1880
- Lucernaria janetae Collins & Daly, 2005
- Lucernaria quadricornis O.F.Müller, 1776
- Lucernaria sainthilairei (Redikorzev, 1925)
- Lucernaria sainthilarei (Radicorzew)
- Lucernaria walteri (Antipa, 1892)
