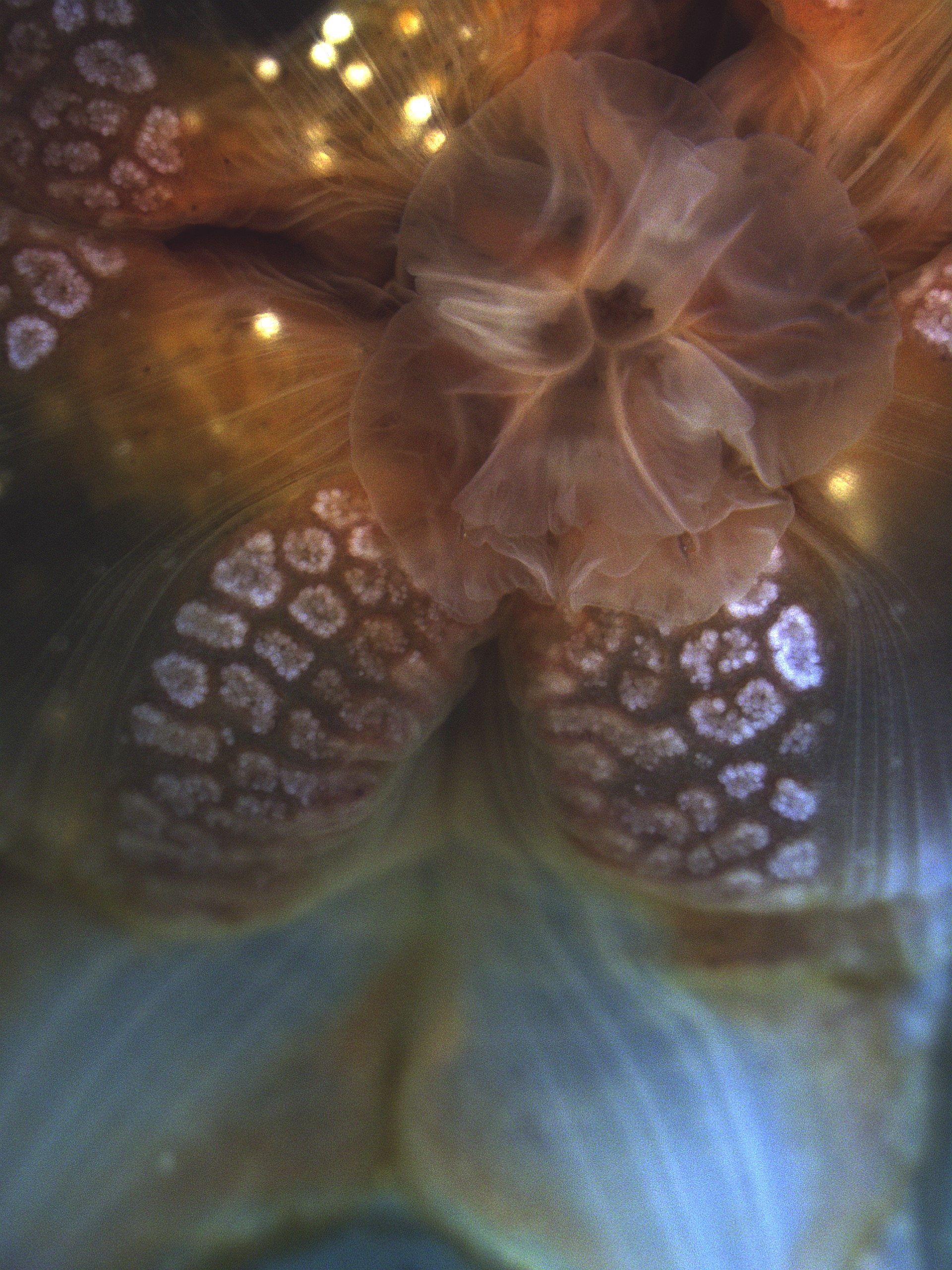
- Lucernaria quadricornis

Scientific classification
- Kingdom: Animalia
- Phylum: Cnidaria
- Class: Staurozoa
- Order: Stauromedusae
- Family: Lucernariidae
- Genus: Lucernaria
- Species: L. quadricornis

Binomial name
- Lucernaria quadricornis O. F. Müller, 1776

= Lucernaria quadricornis =

Species of jellyfish

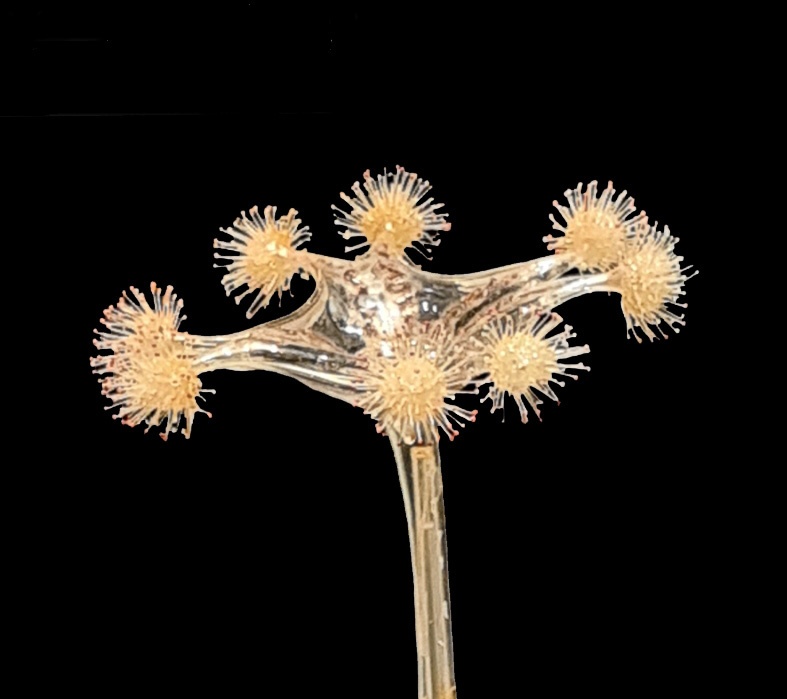
Lucernaria quadricornis (Blaschka glass model)

Lucernaria quadricornis is a species of stalked jellyfish in the family Lucernariidae.

== Habitat ==
It is usually found in the subtidal zone, attached to algae or rocks, but it has been registered as deep as 550 meters.

== Distribution ==
This species is registered in the Arctic and the North Atlantic and North Pacific Ocean. It is known from the north and west coast of Norway, but not the British Isles.
