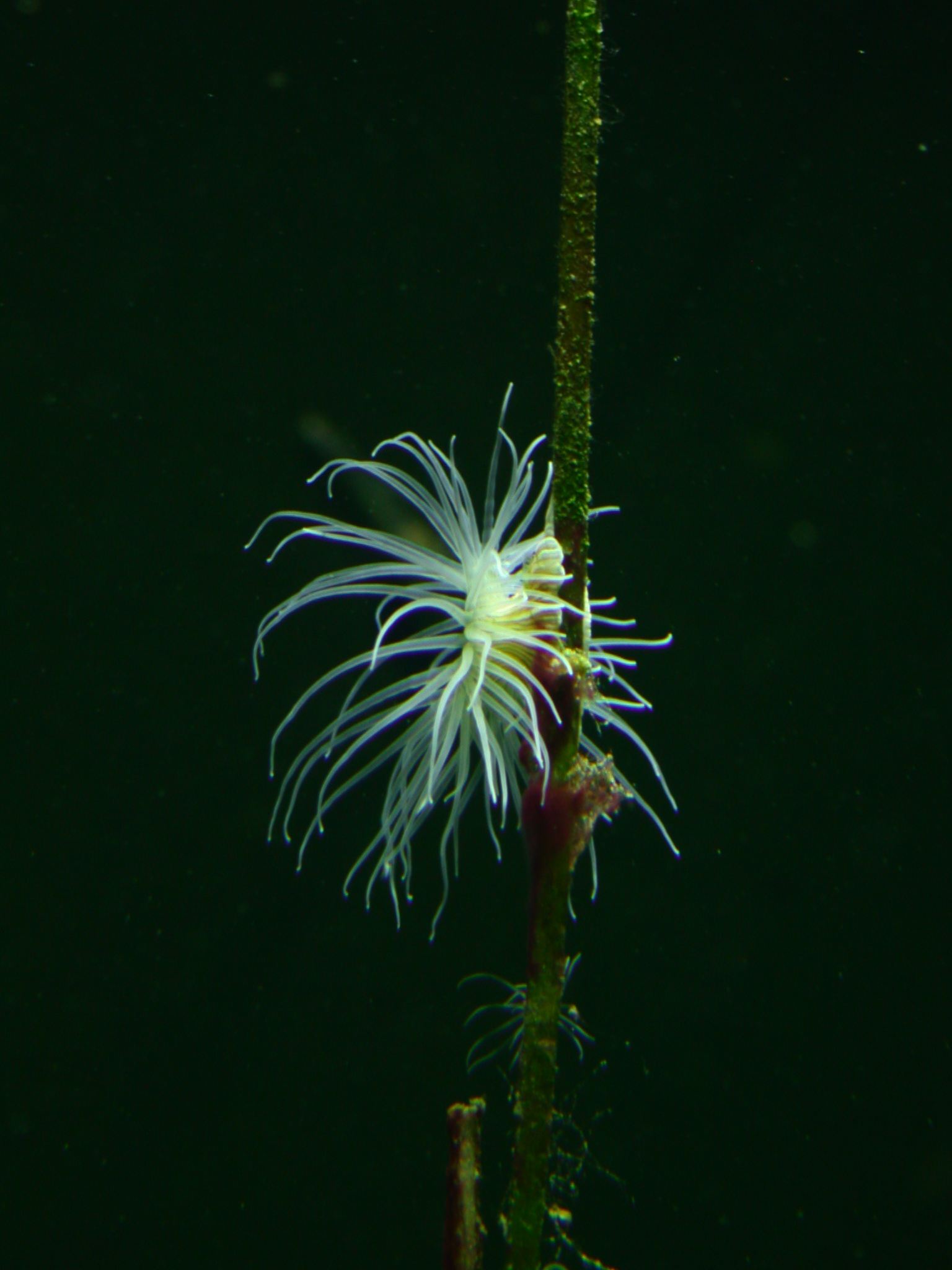
- Sagartiogeton viduatus

Scientific classification
- Kingdom: Animalia
- Phylum: Cnidaria
- Subphylum: Anthozoa
- Class: Hexacorallia
- Order: Actiniaria
- Family: Sagartiidae
- Genus: Sagartiogeton; Carlgren, 1924

Species
- See text

= Sagartiogeton =

Genus of sea anemones

Sagartiogeton is a genus of sea anemones in the family Sagartiidae.

== Species ==
The following species are recognised:

- Sagartiogeton abyssorum Carlgren, 1942
- Sagartiogeton californicus (Carlgren, 1940)
- Sagartiogeton entellae Schmidt, 1972
- Sagartiogeton flexibilis (Danielssen, 1890)
- Sagartiogeton ingolfi Carlgren, 1928
- Sagartiogeton laceratus (Dalyell, 1848)
- Sagartiogeton robustus Carlgren, 1924
- Sagartiogeton tubicolus (Koren & Danielssen, 1877)
- Sagartiogeton undatus (Müller, 1778)
- Sagartiogeton verrilli Carlgren, 1942
- Sagartiogeton viduatus (Müller, 1776)

The following species are now moved to different genera:

- Sagartiogeton antarcticus Carlgren, 1928 accepted as Kadosactis antarctica (Carlgren, 1928)
- Sagartiogeton praelongus Carlgren, 1928 accepted as Daontesia praelonga (Carlgren, 1928)
