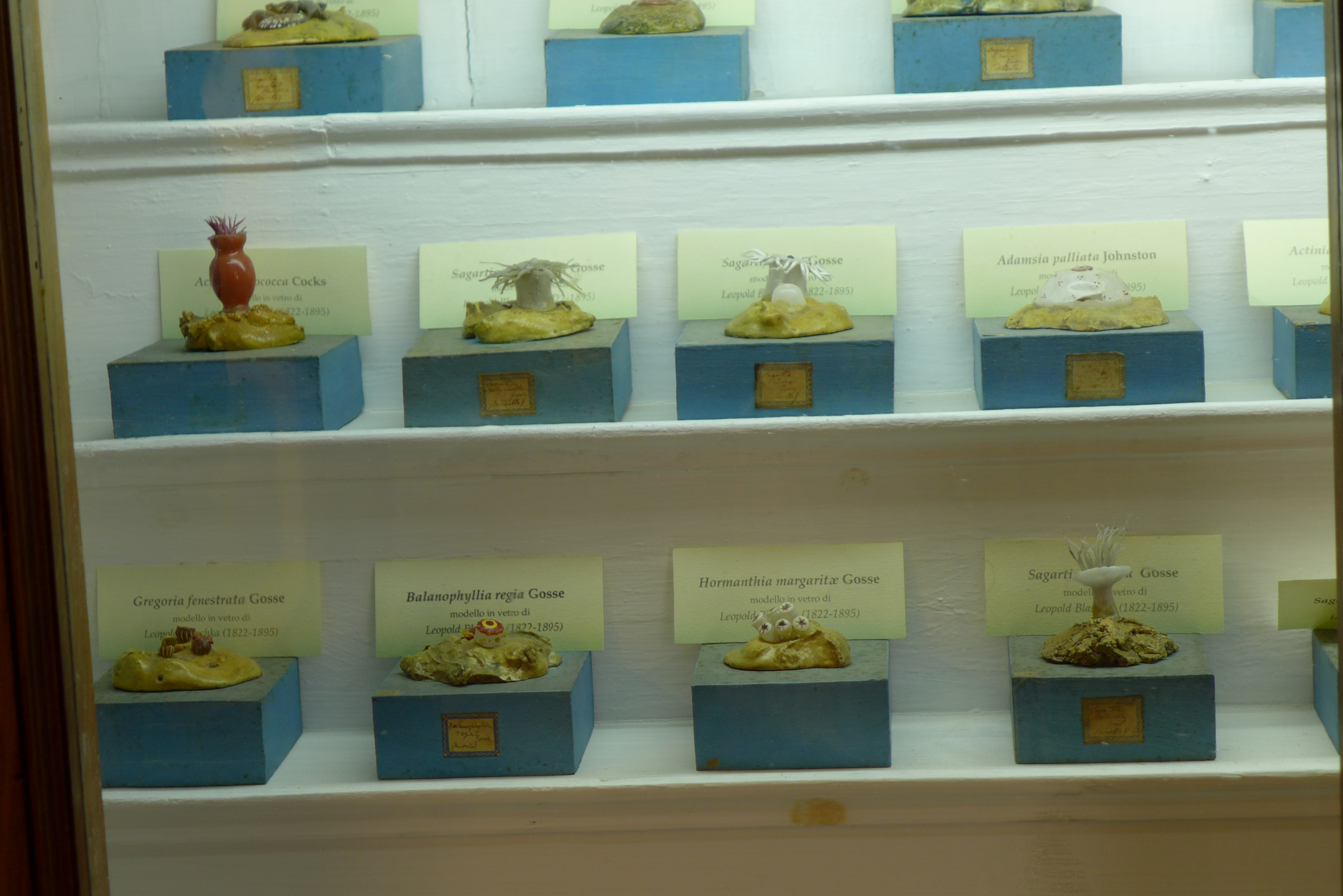
- Glass model of Gregoria fenestrata (bottom left)

Scientific classification
- Domain: Eukaryota
- Kingdom: Animalia
- Phylum: Cnidaria
- Subphylum: Anthozoa
- Class: Hexacorallia
- Order: Actiniaria
- Family: Sagartiidae
- Genus: Gregoria
- Species: G. fenestrata

Binomial name
- Gregoria fenestrata Gosse, 1860

= Gregoria fenestrata =

Species of sea anemone

Gregoria fenestrata is a species of sea anemone in the monotypic genus Gregoria.
