= Cerea (disambiguation) =

Cerea is a town in the region of Veneto in Italy.

Cerea, waxy in Latin, may refer to:

- Cerea (Crete), a town of ancient Crete
- Cerea, a fictional planet in the Star Wars franchise

== See also ==
- Cereus (disambiguation)
