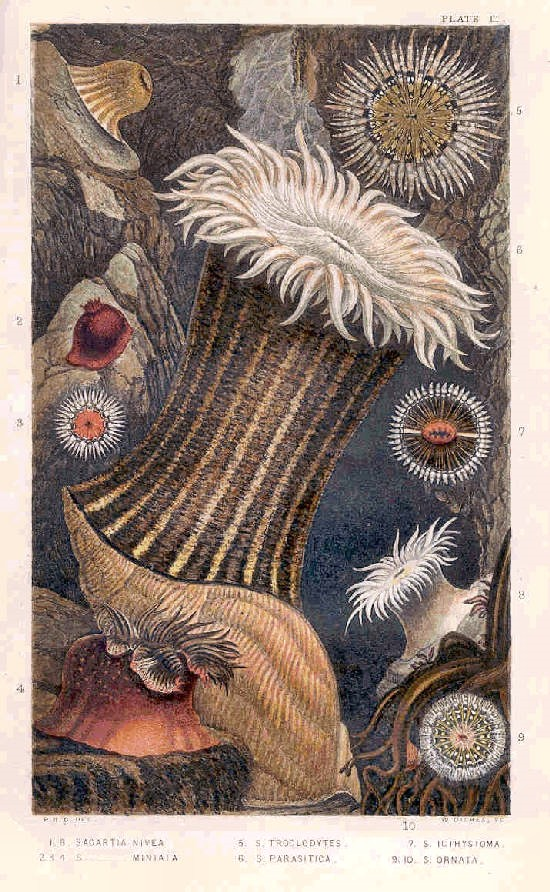
- 1. Sagartia elegans var. nivea, 2. 3. 4. S. elegans var. miniata, 5. S, troglodytes, 6. S. parasitica, 7. S. îcthystoma 8. 9. S. ornata.

Scientific classification
- Kingdom: Animalia
- Phylum: Cnidaria
- Subphylum: Anthozoa
- Class: Hexacorallia
- Order: Actiniaria
- Family: Sagartiidae
- Genus: Sagartia; Gosse, 1855

Species
- See text

Synonyms
- Sagaratia; Sagarta; Sargartia

= Sagartia =

Genus of sea anemones

Sagartia is a genus of sea anemones in the family Sagartiidae. The genus was first described by Philip Henry Gosse in 1855 and the image is his painting of several species found in British waters included in his book, A history of the British sea-anemones and corals.

== Species ==
The following species are recognised:

- Sagartia alba (Cocks in Johnston, 1847)
- Sagartia albovirdis Kirk & Stuckey, 1909
- Sagartia capensis Pax, 1922
- Sagartia carcinophila Verrill, 1869
- Sagartia catalinensis McPeak, 1968
- Sagartia crispata Verrill, 1869
- Sagartia elegans (Dalyell, 1848)
- Sagartia hastata Wright, 1859
- Sagartia ichthystoma Gosse, 1858
- Sagartia lessonii (Lesson, 1830)
- Sagartia minima Pax, 1922
- Sagartia napensis (Stimpson, 1856)
- Sagartia nigropunctata (Stimpson, 1856)
- Sagartia nymphaea (Drayton in Dana, 1846)
- Sagartia ornata (Holdsworth, 1855)
- Sagartia problematica Pax, 1922
- Sagartia rhododactylos (Grube, 1840)
- Sagartia rockalliensis Carlgren, 1924
- Sagartia rubroalba (Quoy & Gaimard, 1833)
- Sagartia sobolescens Gravier, 1918
- Sagartia sociabilis Gravier, 1918
- Sagartia splendens Danielssen, 1890
- Sagartia troglodytes (Price in Johnston, 1847)
- Sagartia lacerata Dalyell, 1848
