= Lucernaria janetae =

Scientific classification
- Kingdom: Animalia
- Phylum: Cnidaria
- Class: Staurozoa
- Order: Stauromedusae
- Family: Lucernariidae
- Genus: Lucernaria
- Species: L. janetae

Binomial name
- Lucernaria janetae Collins and Daly, 2005

Species of jellyfish

Lucernaria janetae is an exceptionally large stalked jellyfish discovered on deep-sea hydrothermal vents on the East Pacific Rise in 2003 and described in 2005.

== Name ==
This species was named after Dr Janet Voight of the Field Museum of Natural History in Chicago "in recognition of her commitment to discovering and describing deep-sea invertebrates".

== Description ==
L. janetae is an exceptionally large stalked jellyfish. It has eight distinct arms which are tipped with clusters of about 100 secondary tentacles. Small juvenile forms of this species sometimes have small, ovate primary tentacles but these are always absent in the adult organism. This species does not have anchor tentacles. The 'umbrella' (calyx) of this organism is goblet-shaped and creamy white with a hint of green or orange. It is up to 100mm wide and 50mm deep, a significantly larger calyx size than those of other members of this genus. The 'stalk' (peduncle) is the same colour as the calyx. Unlike the peduncles of many Stauromedusae, which often have 4 chambers, the peduncle of L. janetae only has a single chamber.

== Distribution and habitat ==
It is the only known species of Lucernaria from the Pacific Ocean. All other members of this genus inhabit the Atlantic Ocean. It is the first and currently the only known Stauromedusan described as living near a hydrothermal vent. L. janetae has been found at depths ranging between 2500-2700m. When originally described it was believed to be the second deepest-living member of the genus Lucernaria, the deepest living known Stauromedusan was then Lucernaria bathyphila, recorded at a depth of 2800m. However a recent study found organisms which could be L. janetae at 3001m. As of 2006, these organisms are, the deepest living known Stauromedusae. Unlike most Stauromedusae, which are solitary organisms, L. janetae forms large populations and, where it occurs, is the dominant macrofauna.

== Feeding ==
L. janetae eats small pelagic crustaceans which probably include amphipods, a common prey of Stauromedusae, since amphipods (Halice hesmonectes) were found in the same region as a possible population of L. janetae.

== Lifecycle ==
L. janetae has 8 gonads which are shaped like lances and arranged in pairs extending from the centre of the calyx to the base of the arms. They give the organism an orange/pink colour when reproductively active. The scientists who originally identified L. janetae have speculated that this species may also be capable of asexual reproduction. This had not been shown for any Stauromedusan at the time the paper was written, although it has subsequently been suggested for Haliclystus antarcticus. Stauromedusae are believed to be sessile, except in the larval stage. The larvae are able to move by crawling but are believed not to migrate large distances. It is therefore presently unclear as to how L. janetae is able colonise multiple unconnected vents.
