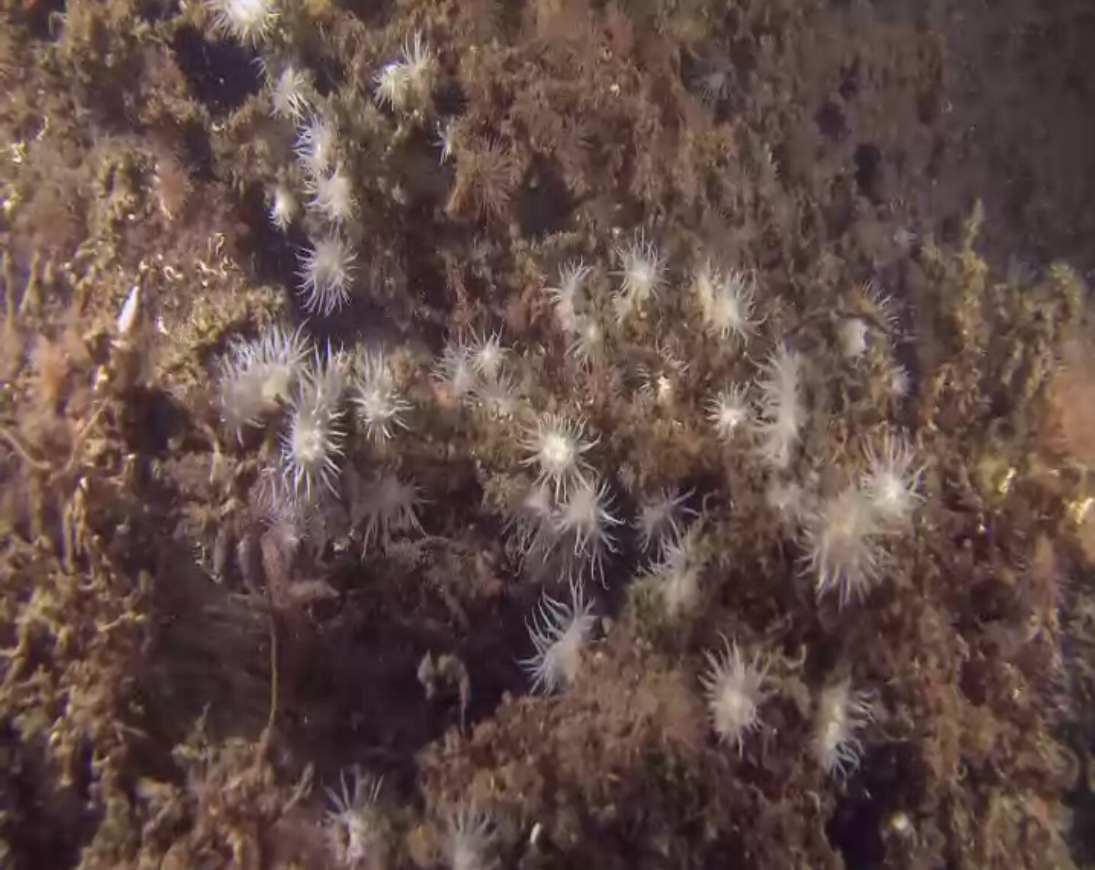
- Actinothoe sphyrodeta in the Netherlands

Scientific classification
- Kingdom: Animalia
- Phylum: Cnidaria
- Subphylum: Anthozoa
- Class: Hexacorallia
- Order: Actiniaria
- Family: Sagartiidae
- Genus: Actinothoe; Fischer, 1889

= Actinothoe =

Genus of sea anemones

Actinothoe is a genus of cnidarians belonging to the family Sagartiidae.

The genus has cosmopolitan distribution.

== Species ==
Species:

- Actinothoe alderi (Cocks, 1851)
- Actinothoe anguicoma (Price in Johnston, 1847)
- Actinothoe bellii (Cocks, 1851)
- Actinothoe bradleyi (Verrill, 1869)
- Actinothoe carlgreni (Haddon & Duerden, 1896)
- Actinothoe georgiana (Carlgren, 1899)
- Actinothoe glandulosa Carlgren, 1954
- Actinothoe gracillima (McMurrich, 1887)
- Actinothoe gravieri (Pax, 1912)
- Actinothoe ignea (Fischer, 1874)
- Actinothoe kerguelensis (Pax, 1922)
- Actinothoe lobata (Carlgren, 1899)
- Actinothoe milmani (Haddon & Shackleton, 1893)
- Actinothoe modesta (Verrill, 1866)
- Actinothoe paradoxa (McMurrich, 1893)
- Actinothoe patagonica (Carlgren, 1899)
- Actinothoe pellucida (Cocks, 1851)
- Actinothoe plebeia (Haddon, 1898)
- Actinothoe pustulata (McMurrich, 1887)
- Actinothoe qingdaoensis Pei, 1993
- Actinothoe sanmatiensis (McMurrich, 1893)
- Actinothoe sphyrodeta (Gosse, 1858)
- Actinothoe yarrellii (Cocks, 1851)
