= Waxy =

Waxy may refer to:

- a substance related to wax
- colloquially for a waxworm (particularly used by anglers)
- Waxy (band), an American stoner rock band
- Waxy (horse), a thoroughbred racehorse
- WAXY (AM), a radio station (790 AM) licensed to serve South Miami, Florida, United States
- WQAM-FM, a radio station (104.3 FM) licensed to serve Miramar, Florida, which held the call sign WAXY-FM from 2012 to 2015
- WBGG-FM, a radio station (105.9 FM) licensed to serve Fort Lauderdale, Florida, which held the call signs WAXY and WAXY-FM from 1971 to 1994

== Also ==
- Waxy cap, a taxon of white-spored agarics
- Waxy corn, a maize variety found in China in 1909
- Waxy flexibility, a psychomotor symptom of catatonic schizophrenia
- Waxy monkey leaf frog, a frog species found in South and Central American
- Waxy potato starch, a new type of starch only containing amylopectin molecules
- Waxy skin, a cutaneous condition observed in roughly 50% of diabetic patients with longstanding disease

== See also ==
- Cereus (disambiguation), Cerea (disambiguation), waxy in Latin
