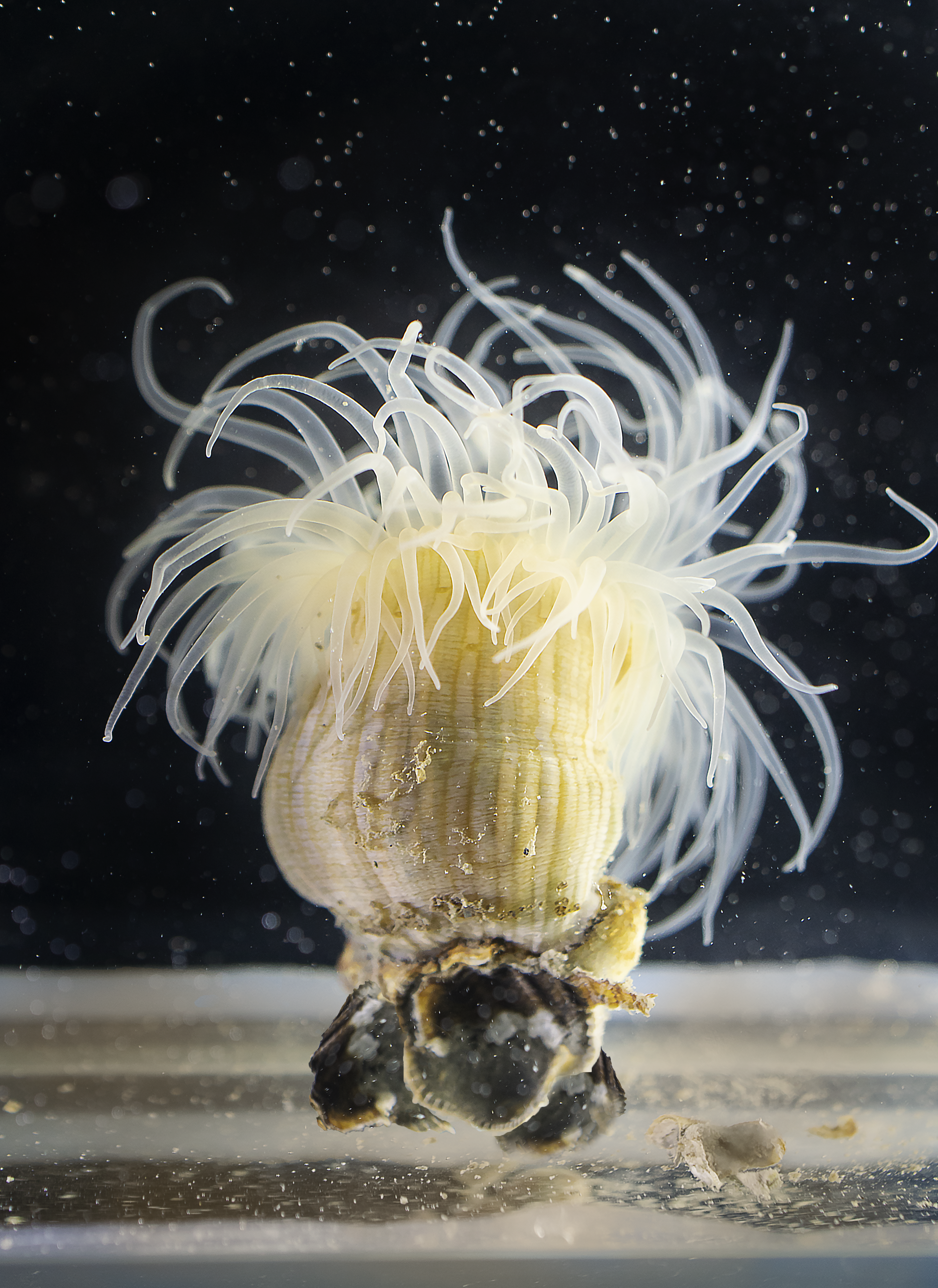
- Sagartiogeton undatus in the Netherlands

Conservation status
- Data Deficient (IUCN 3.1) (Mediterranean)

Scientific classification
- Kingdom: Animalia
- Phylum: Cnidaria
- Subphylum: Anthozoa
- Class: Hexacorallia
- Order: Actiniaria
- Family: Sagartiidae
- Genus: Sagartiogeton
- Species: S. undatus

Binomial name
- Sagartiogeton undatus (Müller, 1778)

Synonyms
- List: Actinia clavata (Ilmoni, 1830); Actinia undata (Müller, 1778); Actinia undata (Ilmoni, 1830); Actinia undulosa; Actinia zebra (Grube, 1840); Actinothoe clavata (Ilmoni, 1830); Actinothoe undata (Müller, 1778); Cylista undata (Müller, 1778); Paractis undata; Sagartia undata (Müller, 1778); Sagartia viduata troglodytes (Müller); Sagartiogeton undatus(Müller, 1778); Sagartiogeton undata (Müller, 1778)

= Sagartiogeton undatus =

Species of sea anemone

Sagartiogeton undatus, or small snakelocks anemone, is a species of sea anemone in the family Sagartiidae. The species was originally described by Otto Friedrich Müller in 1778

== Distribution ==
Sagartiogeton undatus is found on all British coasts and is widespread throughout western Europe from Scandinavia to the Mediterranean.

== Description ==
Sagartiogeton undatus has a base with a diameter of up to 60 mm and can grow to a height of 120 mm or more.
