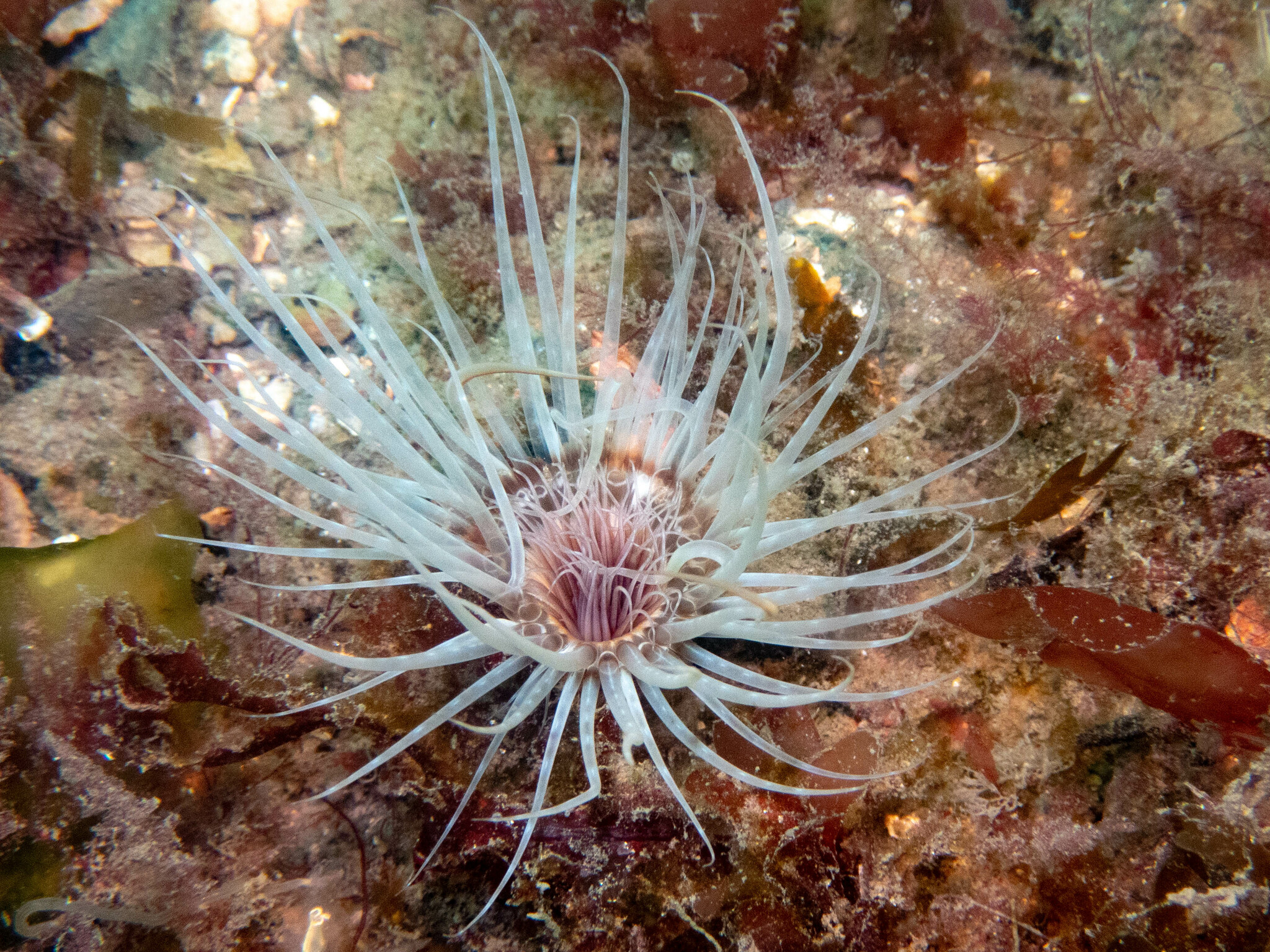

Scientific classification
- Kingdom: Animalia
- Phylum: Cnidaria
- Subphylum: Anthozoa
- Class: Hexacorallia
- Order: Ceriantharia
- Family: Cerianthidae
- Genus: Cerianthus
- Species: C. lloydii

Binomial name
- Cerianthus lloydii Gosse, 1859

Synonyms
- List: Arachnactis bournei Fowler, 1897; Cerianthus borealis Danielssen, 1860; Cerianthus danielsseni Levinsen; Cerianthus lloydi Gosse, 1859; Cerianthus loydii [lapsus]; Cerianthus lütkenii Andres, 1883; Cerianthus septentrionalis van Beneden, 1923; Synarachnactis bournei (Fowler, 1897)

= Cerianthus lloydii =

Species of sea anemone

Cerianthus lloydii is a species of tube-dwelling sea anemone in the family Cerianthidae. It is sometimes called the lesser cylinder anemone and is found in shallow seas around the coasts of north west Europe.

== Taxonomy ==
Cerianthus lloydii was first described by the English naturalist Philip Henry Gosse in 1859. The American zoologist Henry Weed Fowler in 1897 used the name Synarachnactis bournei to describe a juvenile anemone that he had discovered. It was later established that this was in fact the larval stage of C. lloydii. Consequently, the name S. bournei was disallowed and is now considered a junior synonym of C. lloydii.

== Description ==
Cerianthus lloydii grows to about 15 cm (6 in) long. It does not have a pedal disc with which to attach itself to the substrate but instead lives in a flexible parchment-like tube up to 40 cm (16 in) long. This is buried in sand or mud with one end above the surface. Sand grains, debris and shell fragments usually stick to the outer side of the tube and the anemone extends its tentacles above the sediment to feed. The anemone can move freely within the tube and has powerful longitudinal muscles in its column which enable it to retreat swiftly into the tube. Unlike Actiniaria anemones, the tentacles themselves are unable to retract into the column. There are about seventy long, slender, tapering tentacles in an outer ring. These can span about 7 centimetres (2.8 in) when fully extended. The inner ring of tentacles are short and surround the central mouth. They are used to manipulate food particles and push them into the mouth. The general colour of the anemone is pale brown and the tentacles are varying shades of brown, green or cream, often striped with darker brown.

Cerianthus lloydii might be confused with a less common species of anemone, Pachycerianthus multiplicatus, but this is rather larger and has about two hundred long outer tentacles giving it a feathery appearance.

== Distribution and habitat ==
Cerianthus lloydii is found in the north east Atlantic Ocean from low water mark down to about 100 metres (330 ft). The range extends from Greenland and the Barents Sea to the Bay of Biscay. This anemone is locally common round the coasts of Britain except for eastern England between the River Tees and the Wash. It is usually found buried in sand, gravel or mud but sometimes inhabits crevices in the rock.

== Biology ==
Cerianthus lloydii burrows by arching itself up and inserting its narrow foot into the sediment. Alternate expansions and contractions of the muscles in its body wall enable it to dig its way deeper until only the tentacles project. The fibrous burrow wall is composed of discharged nematocysts and adherent sand. As sedimentation occurs, the tube is lengthened upwards, and may develop disproportionally to the size of the animal; one tube was measured as being a metre long. In extreme cases of sedimentation, when it is in danger of being swamped, the animal can eject itself from its tube, move to a more suitable location and secrete a new tube.

Cerianthus lloydii feeds on zooplankton and small crustaceans that come within reach of its tentacles. It is also a scavenger and in the aquarium can be fed on fragments of meat. Although it reacts fast to threats by retreating into its tube, the lemon sole (Microstomus kitt) is one of several species of fish that feed on it and other sea anemones.

Spawning in Cerianthus lloydii takes place between January and August. The eggs hatch into planula larvae which remain planktonic for about four months. They are at first oval but pass through several stages, becoming more elongated and developing 9 to 11 stumpy marginal tentacles before they settle on the sea bed. There is no medusa stage. Asexual reproduction by budding sometimes takes place.
