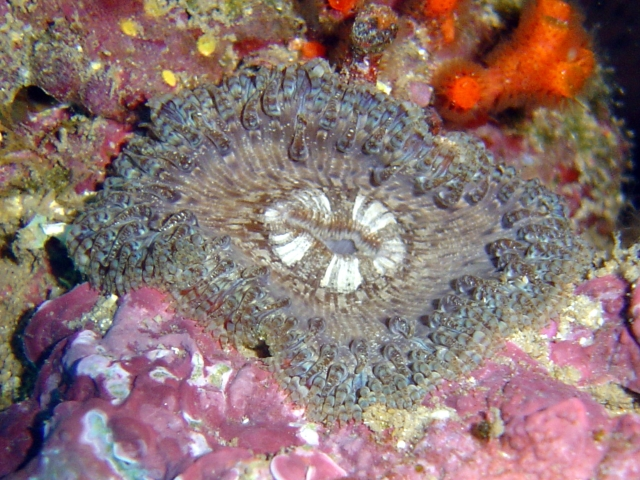

Conservation status
- Least Concern (IUCN 3.1) (Mediterranean)

Scientific classification
- Kingdom: Animalia
- Phylum: Cnidaria
- Subphylum: Anthozoa
- Class: Hexacorallia
- Order: Actiniaria
- Family: Sagartiidae
- Genus: Cereus
- Species: C. pedunculatus

Binomial name
- Cereus pedunculatus (Pennant, 1777)

Synonyms
- List: Actinea bellis (Pennant, 1777); Actinea johstoni; Actinea templetonii; Actinia brevicirrata; Actinia brevicirrhata Risso, 1826; Actinia bellis Ellis & Solander, 1786; Actinia johnstoni Cocks; Actinia pedunculata Pennant, 1777; Actinia templetonii Couch, 1844; Actinocereus pedunculata; Actinocereus pedunculatus; Cereus bellis; Cereus pedonculatus; Cereus pendunculatus; Cribrina bellis Ehrenberg; Discosoma brevicirrhata; Haliactis bellis Ellis; Helaria bellis; Heliactis bellis Ellis; Hormathia bellis (Forbes); Hydra calyciflora Gaertner, 1762; Sagartia bellis (Ellis & Solander); Sagartia troglodytes Gosse; Scyphia bellis (Ellis)

= Cereus pedunculatus =

Species of sea anemone

Cereus pedunculatus, commonly known as the daisy anemone, is a species of sea anemone in the family Sagartiidae. It is found in shallow parts of the northeast Atlantic Ocean and in the North Sea and the Mediterranean Sea. It functions as an omnivore, predator, and scavenger.

== Description ==
Cereus pedunculatus has a base that is sometimes frilled at the edge. It is wider than the trunk which is covered with small dots and can be cream, pink, brown or violet. The trunk may be stalk-like and up to ten centimeters tall, or shaped more like a trumpet. Both these forms can retract back into a squat, tentacle‑fringed mound. The oral disk may be seven centimeters wide or even wider. There are more than 500 short, flaccid tentacles which may be a plain color, banded or speckled.

== Distribution and habitat ==
Cereus pedunculatus is found in the northeast Atlantic Ocean south to the Azores, in the North Sea and the Mediterranean Sea at depths down to 50 meters. It is common around the southern and western coasts of the British Isles. It may grow in rock pools, often with the base and column concealed in a crevice, or it may be found in muddy gravel where it is anchored to a stone or other subsurface object. In this case, the tentacles are the only part that project and the whole animal can be withdrawn into the substrate if danger threatens.
