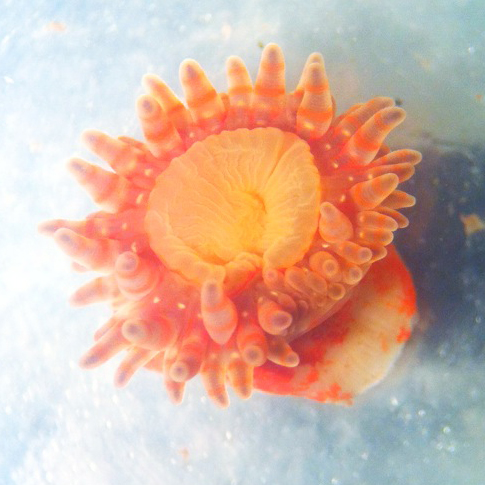

Scientific classification
- Domain: Eukaryota
- Kingdom: Animalia
- Phylum: Cnidaria
- Subphylum: Anthozoa
- Class: Hexacorallia
- Order: Actiniaria
- Family: Actinostolidae
- Genus: Stomphia
- Species: S. coccinea

Binomial name
- Stomphia coccinea Müller, 1776

Synonyms
- List: Actinia carneola Stimpson, 1853; Actinia coccinea Müller, 1776; Actinia nitida Dawson, 1858; Cylista coccinea (Müller, 1776); Kylindrosactis elegans Danielssen, 1890; Sagartia repens Danielssen, 1890; Stomophia coccinea; Stomphia carneola (Stimpson, 1853); Stomphia churchiae Gosse, 1859

= Stomphia coccinea =

Species of sea anemone

Stomphia coccinea is a small reddish, orange or brownish coloured species of sea anemone in the family Actinostolidae from the North Atlantic, North Pacific and Arctic Ocean. It can swim away when necessary in order to escape a predator.

== Morphology ==
The specific name ‘coccinea’ means ‘scarlet’ and refers to the anemone's distinctive often reddish and orange-striped coloration both on the column and on its up to 80 tentacles. The anemone can grow to a size of 6 cm in diameter, but the anemone has a very flat appearance when retracted.

== Ecology ==
This species attaches itself to rocks and shells, with the most common substrate in northern Europe being the shell of the horse mussel Modiolus modiolus, where, as a suspension feeder it consumes planktonic material. When there is an attack from one of its predators, such as a starfish, or an individual of the nudibranch species Aeolidia papillosa or Eubranchus exiguus, it can release the grip of its disc and float away. If it is successful in escaping, it will soon after attach to a new substrate.
