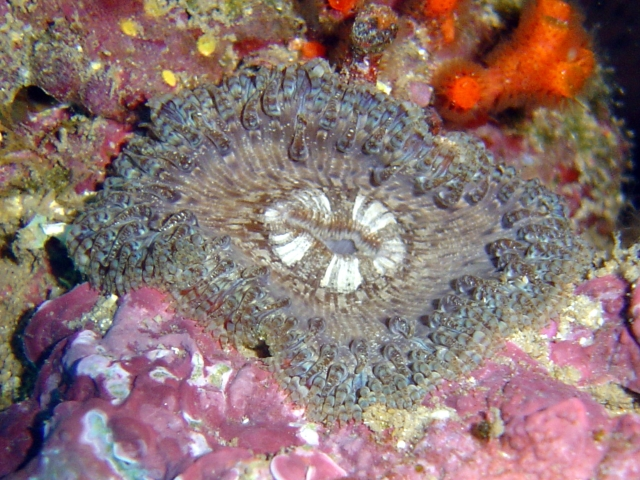
- Cereus pedunculatus found in Spain

Scientific classification
- Kingdom: Animalia
- Phylum: Cnidaria
- Subphylum: Anthozoa
- Class: Hexacorallia
- Order: Actiniaria
- Family: Sagartiidae
- Genus: Cereus; Ilmoni, 1830

Species
- See text

= Cereus (cnidarian) =

Genus of sea anemones

Cereus is a genus of sea anemones in the family Sagartiidae.

== Species ==
Species in the genus include:

- Cereus amethystinus (Quoy & Gaimard, 1833)
- Cereus filiformis (Rapp, 1829)
- Cereus herpetodes (McMurrich, 1904)
- Cereus pedunculatus (Pennant, 1777)
