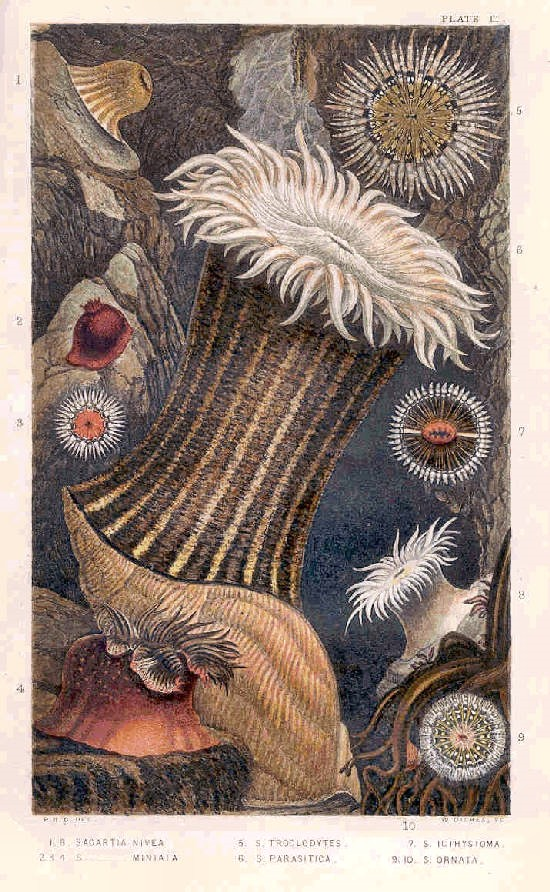
- 1. Sagartia elegans var. nivea, 2. 3. 4. S. elegans var. miniata, 5. S, troglodytes, 6. S. parasitica, 7. S. îcthystoma 8. 9. S. ornata.

Conservation status
- Least Concern (IUCN 3.1) (Mediterranean)

Scientific classification
- Kingdom: Animalia
- Phylum: Cnidaria
- Subphylum: Anthozoa
- Class: Hexacorallia
- Order: Actiniaria
- Family: Sagartiidae
- Genus: Sagartia
- Species: S. elegans

Binomial name
- Sagartia elegans (Dalyell, 1848)

Synonyms
- List: Actinia elegans Dalyell, 1848; Actinia miniata Gosse, 1853; Actinia nivea Gosse, 1853; Actinia ornata Wright, 1856; Actinia pulcherrima Jordan, 1855; Actinia rosea Gosse, 1853; Actinia venusta Gosse, 1854; Adamsia elegans; Bunodes miniata; Cereus aurora; Cereus venusta; Heliactis miniata Gosse; Heliactis venusta Gosse; Sagartia aurora (Gosse, 1854); Sagartia gossei Verrill, 1869; Sagartia miniata Gosse; Sagartia nivea (Gosse); Sagartia rosea (Gosse, 1853); Sagartia venusta Gosse; Sargartia aurora

= Sagartia elegans =

Species of sea anemone

Sagartia elegans, the elegant anemone, is a species of sea anemone in the family Sagartiidae. It is found in coastal areas of northwest Europe at depths down to 50 metres.

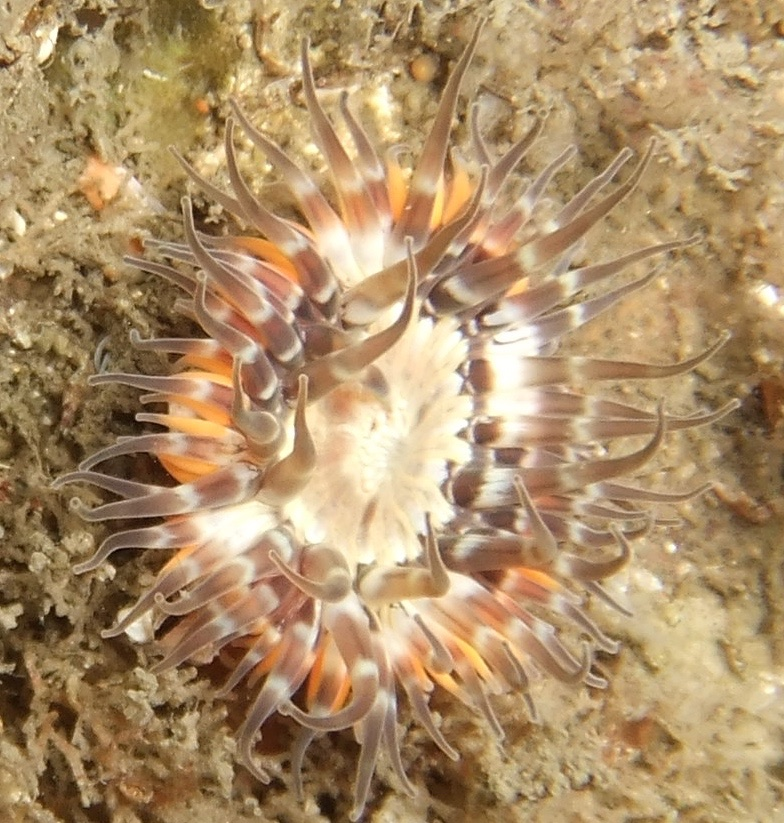

== Description ==
The base of S. elegans is wider than the column and may reach 3 cm (1.2 in) in diameter. The base is usually anchored to the substrate but can be used as a foot for locomotion. It often has a ragged outline due to fragmentation having occurred. The column is soft and fleshy and varies in shape, even in one individual, from squat to cylindrical or trumpet shaped, and can grow up to 6 cm (2.4 in) tall. The lower part of the column is somewhat corrugated and there are a number of pale coloured suckers on the upper part to which grit or shell fragments may adhere occasionally. The disc is saucer-shaped with an undulating margin and there are up to 200 tentacles arranged irregularly, often arching over the edge. These are mostly about the same length but occasionally there is a much longer one among them. This may be used, as it is in some other sea anemone species, to prevent competing organisms from settling and occupying space nearby. When it is disturbed, a large number of white threads known as acontia are discharged from cells on the column and from the mouth. These are for defensive purposes and are armed with nematocysts.

When not submerged, S. elegans hangs in a limp fashion. It sometimes partially protrudes the lining of its coelom through its mouth. If disturbed it will retract more completely, disappearing from view if it is lodged in a crevice.

There are a number of differently coloured varieties:

- Var. miniata: Disc variously coloured and patterned with similar coloured tentacles, often banded.
- Var. rosea: Disc variously coloured and patterned and tentacles rose red.
- Var. aurantiaca: Disc grey and tentacles dull orange.
- Var. nivea: Disc and tentacles translucent white.
- Var. venusta: Disc orange or buff and tentacles white.

== Distribution ==
S. elegans is found in coastal areas of the northeast Atlantic Ocean from Scandinavia, Iceland and the North Sea south to the Mediterranean Sea. It is common round the coasts of the British Isles where the form var. miniata is the most abundant. In the Netherlands the population fluctuates widely, with decreases occurring after severe winters with cold sea temperatures.

== Habitat ==
S. elegans is found from the mid-shore down to a depth of about 50 metres. Its base is often in holes and cracks in the rock and it is also found under stones, beneath overhangs, in rock pools and caves. It also favours brightly lit rock walls with fast moving currents.

== Biology ==
S. elegans is an omnivore, scavenger and predator. Most of its nourishment comes from the ingestion of small invertebrates which are caught by the tentacles and thrust into the mouth. The undigested fragments are later expelled through the mouth.

S. elegans often reproduces asexually by fragmentation, also known as basal laceration. As it crawls across a rock surface, pieces of its base become detached and grow into new individuals. This gives rise to groups of sea anemones in close proximity to each other which have identical colourations.

== Ecology ==
Other organisms found in the same habitat include the breadcrumb sponge, Halichondria panicea and the soft coral, Alcyonium digitatum.

== Venom ==
Sponge gatherers in the Mediterranean Sea come in contact with these sea anemones as they collect sponges. This causes a burning and itching sensation followed by erythema and blisters, the symptoms of "sponge fishermen's disease". Individuals may also experience nausea, vomiting, fever, muscle spasms and collapse.
