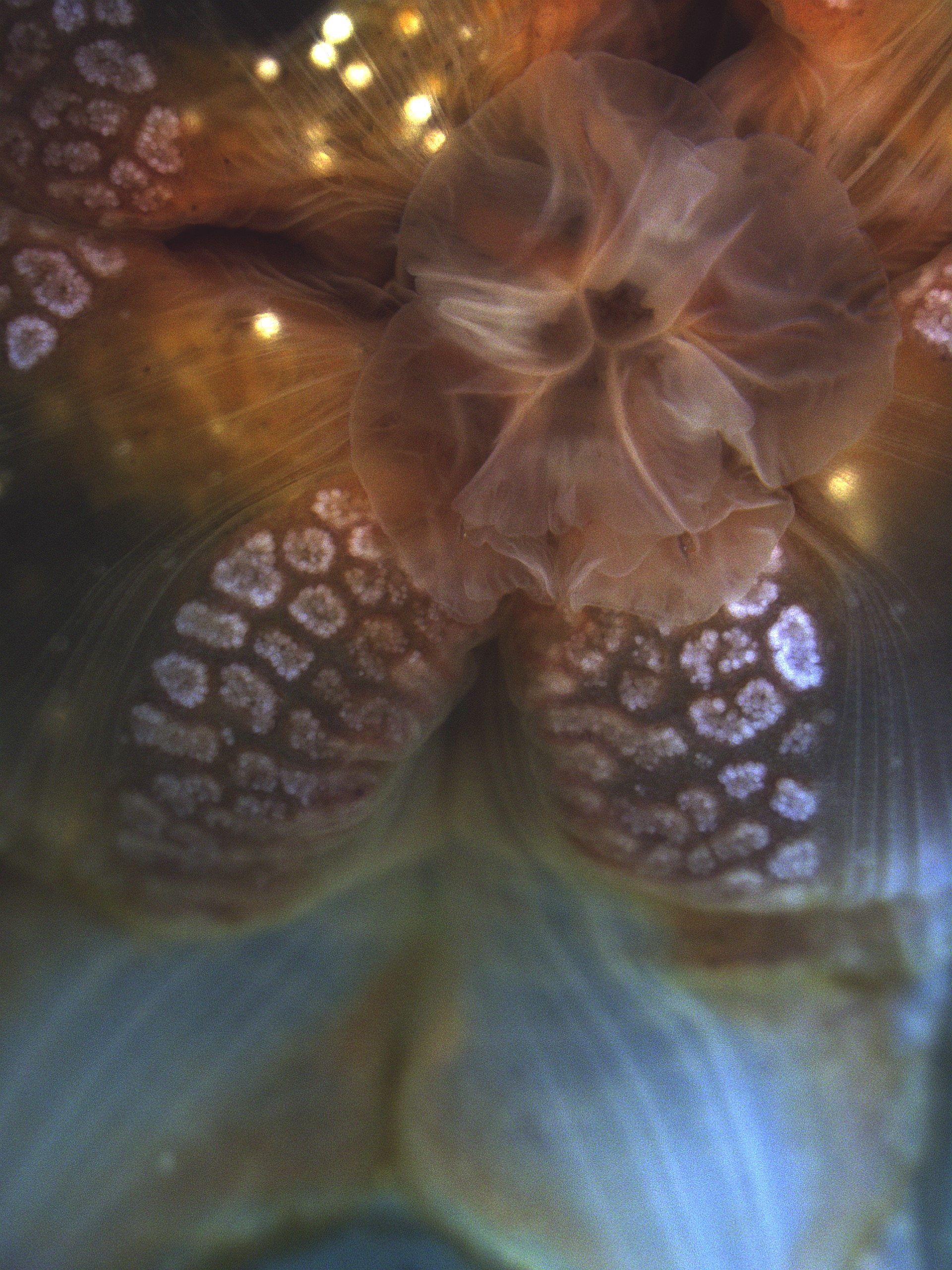
- Lucernaria quadricornis

Scientific classification
- Kingdom: Animalia
- Phylum: Cnidaria
- Class: Staurozoa
- Order: Stauromedusae
- Suborder: Myostaurida
- Family: Lucernariidae; Johnston, 1847

Genera
- Lucernaria; Stylocoronella

= Lucernariidae =

Family of jellyfishes

Lucernariidae is a family of stalked jellyfish containing two genera.

== Species ==
- Genus Lucernaria O. F. Müller, 1776
  - Lucernaria australis Vanhöffen, 1908
  - Lucernaria bathyphila Haeckel, 1880
  - Lucernaria haeckeli (Antipa, 1892)
  - Lucernaria infundibulum Haeckel, 1880
  - Lucernaria janetae Collins & Daly, 2005
  - Lucernaria quadricornis O. F. Müller, 1776
  - Lucernaria sainthilairei (Redikorzev, 1925)
  - Lucernaria walteri (Antipa, 1892)
- Genus Stylocoronella Salvini-Plawen, 1966
  - Stylocoronella riedli Salvini-Plawen, 1966
  - Stylocoronella variabilis Salvini-Plawen, 1987
