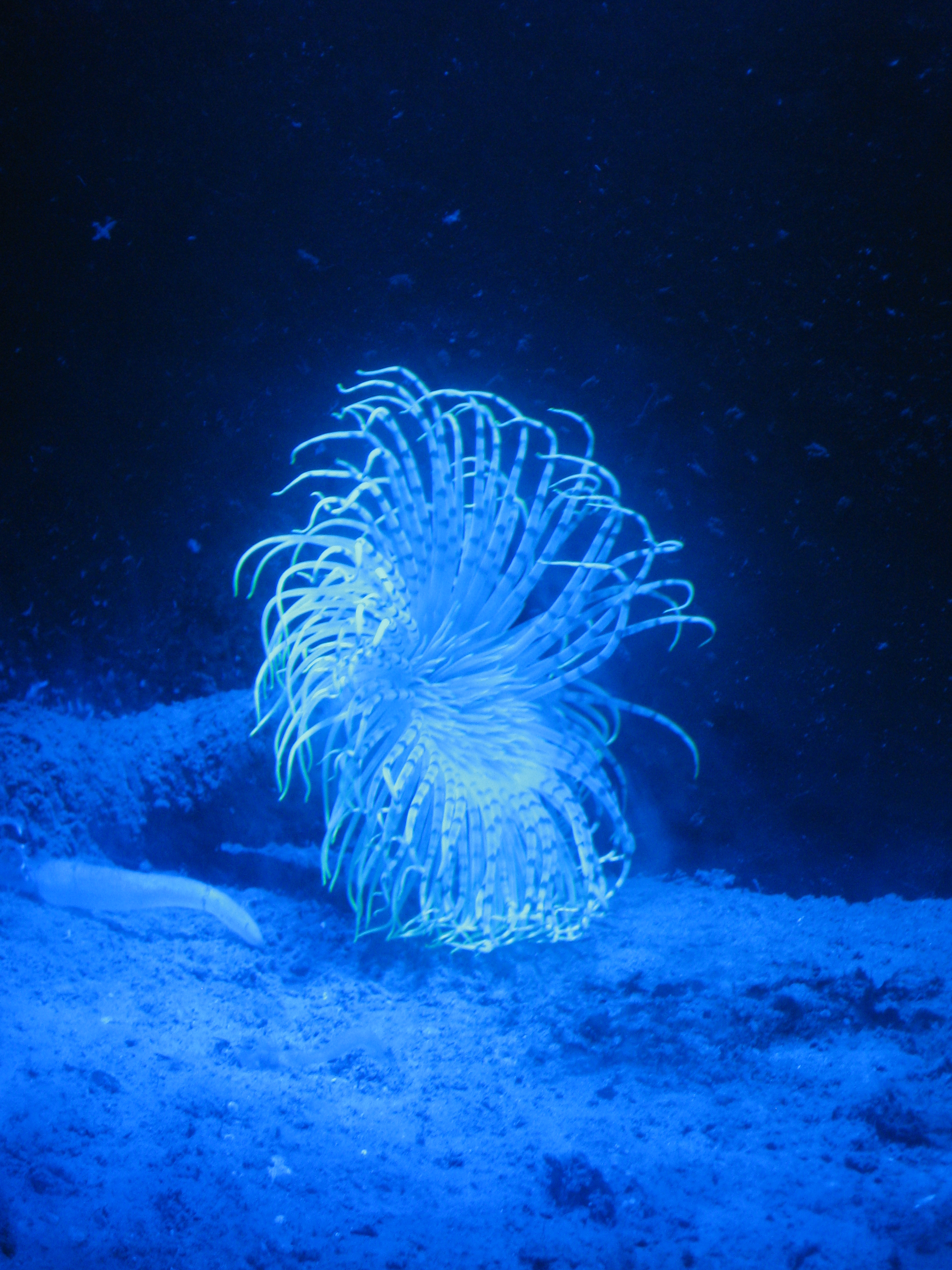

Scientific classification
- Kingdom: Animalia
- Phylum: Cnidaria
- Subphylum: Anthozoa
- Class: Hexacorallia
- Order: Ceriantharia
- Family: Cerianthidae
- Genus: Pachycerianthus
- Species: P. multiplicatus

Binomial name
- Pachycerianthus multiplicatus Carlgren, 1912

= Pachycerianthus multiplicatus =

Species of sea anemone

Pachycerianthus multiplicatus, commonly known as the firework anemone, is a species of tube anemone in the family Cerianthidae. This species is found in sheltered, subtidal mud at depths of 10 – 130m.

== Description ==
These anemones have a stem which extends through the mud up to one meter in length, making the anemone stationary. Each anemone has up to 200 tentacles which are white, or white and brown-striped in colour, and span up to 30 cm in length. They have weak nematocysts. When disturbed, the tentacles curl up into spirals rather than retracting.

== Distribution ==
These anemones are located around the UK in Scotland and Ireland as well as being found in Scandinavia. There are two sites in Ireland: Kilkieran Bay and Kenmare River. In Scotland they are found in sea-lochs along the western coast.

== Biology ==
These anemones feed on planktonic arrow worms of the genus Sagitta. They cannot feed on larger prey items due to their weak nematocysts.

No information is recorded as to the lifespan of firework anemones or their larval dispersal. They are considered to have a restricted dispersal potential, and are therefore at risk from habitat degradation. The firework anemone is not asexual, female eggs are released by the stimulation of male gametes.

The biggest threats to the firework anemone are trawling, and dredging for scallops, both of which disturb the mud substrate and can potentially damage the anemones.
