= Acontia (anatomy) =

Stinging filament

Ejection and retraction of defense apparatus acontia in the sea anemone Exaiptasia pallida.

In cnidarian anatomy, acontias (singular acontia) are threadlike tissues, composed largely of stinging cells located in the coelenteron of certain sea anemones. They are thrown out of the mouth or special pores when irritated.
