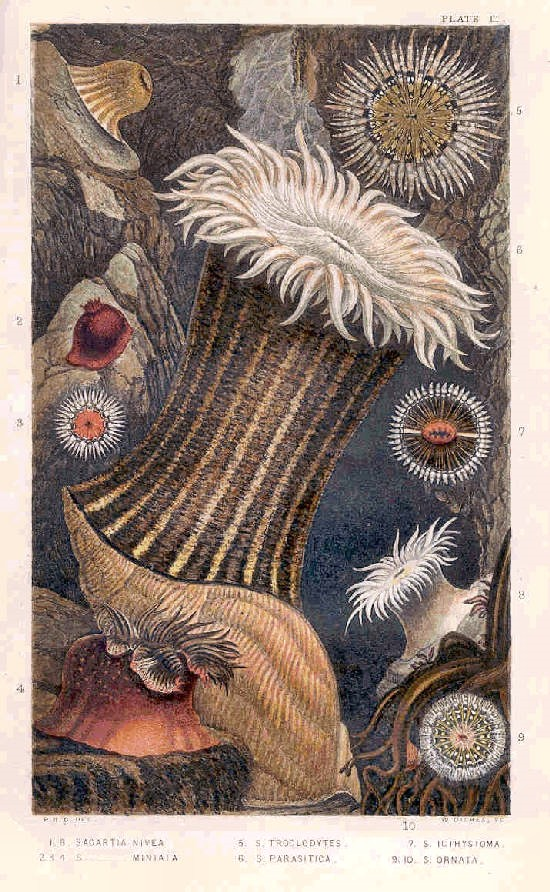
- 1. Sagartia nivea, 2. 3. 4. S. miniata, 5. S, troglodytes, 6. S. parasitica, 7. S. ichthystoma 8. 9. S. ornata.

Scientific classification
- Kingdom: Animalia
- Phylum: Cnidaria
- Subphylum: Anthozoa
- Class: Hexacorallia
- Order: Actiniaria
- Superfamily: Metridioidea
- Family: Sagartiidae; Gosse, 1858

Genera
- See text

= Sagartiidae =

Family of sea anemones

Sagartiidae is a family of sea anemones.

== Genera ==
Genera in the family include:

- Actinothoe Fischer, 1889
- Anthothoe Carlgren, 1938
- Artemidactis Stephenson, 1918
- Botryon Carlgren & Hedgepeth, 1952
- Cancrisocia
- Carcinactis
- Cereus Oken, 1815
- Gregoria
- Habrosanthus
- Octophellia
- Sagartia Gosse, 1855
- Sagartiogeton Carlgren, 1924
- Sicyopus Gravier, 1918
- Verrillactis
