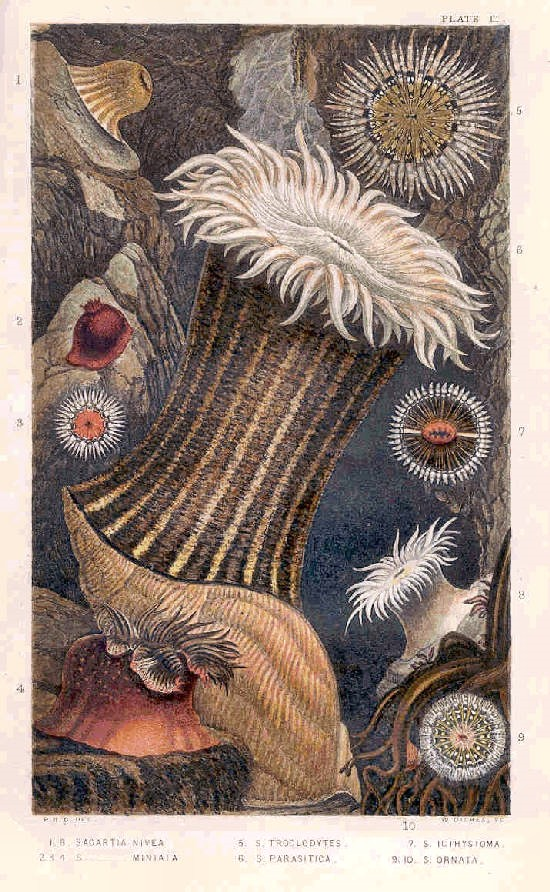
- Several species of Sagartia. S. troglodytes is at top right.

Scientific classification
- Kingdom: Animalia
- Phylum: Cnidaria
- Subphylum: Anthozoa
- Class: Hexacorallia
- Order: Actiniaria
- Family: Sagartiidae
- Genus: Sagartia
- Species: S. troglodytes

Binomial name
- Sagartia troglodytes (Price in Johnston, 1847)

Synonyms
- List: Actinea troglodytes; Actinia aurora Gosse, 1854; Actinia ornata Holdsworth, 1855; Actinia troglodytes Price in Johnston, 1847; Actinia viduata W. Thompson; Cylista troglodytes (Price in Johnston, 1847); Heliactis ornata Holdsworth; Heliactis troglodytes; Heliactis venusta Gosse; Sagaratia troglodytes; Sagartia undata troglodytes Carlgren, 1893; Scolanthus sphaeroides Holdsworth, 1855

= Sagartia troglodytes =

Species of sea anemone

Sagartia troglodytes is a species of sea anemone in the family Sagartiidae, also known as the mud sagartia or the cave-dwelling anemone.

== Description ==
The base is anchored in holes in the rock and is a little wider than the column. This is smooth and firm, extending to a length several times its width, and covered in sticky suckers on its upper part. The usually flat oral disc is finely patterned and surrounded by four or five rings of numerous short tentacles, the longest ones being nearest the mouth. This is raised on a slight mound at the centre of the disc. The general colour is varying sombre shade of olive green or brown with vertical striations on the column. The radial striations on the oral disc are finely patterned in grey, white and black and the tentacles are translucent and banded in white and grey. At the base of each tentacle there is a distinctive black mark shaped like a Roman capital letter "B". Pieces of gravel and fragments of shell are often stuck to the upper part of the column. In size, the column can grow to a diameter of an inch (2.5 cm) and a length of two inches (5 cm) but most specimens are much smaller than this.

== Distribution and habitat ==
S. troglodytes is found in coastal regions of the north east Atlantic Ocean, the North Sea and the Mediterranean Sea. It is common round the coasts of Britain between the tide marks but is relatively little observed because it is well camouflaged and is often hidden in cracks, under overhangs, in rock pools, under seaweed, among mussels or half buried in sand and mud with just its tentacles projecting. In Morecambe Bay, England, it is found anchored to stones buried several inches beneath the surface of this expanse of mudflats, or sometimes not even attached at all but living freely. It can retract into a spherical form when disturbed and no longer be visible from the surface.

== Biology ==
Like other sea anemones, S. troglodytes is a carnivore and feeds on small invertebrates which it traps with its tentacles and channels into its mouth. Any undigested pieces are expelled from the mouth over the period of a few hours or days.

S. troglodytes is a hermaphrodite with gonads inside the body cavity. The eggs are discharged from the mouth, being wafted out individually by cilia on the tentacles. The sperm are produced separately also emanating from the mouth when they give the appearance of a white plume being liberated into the water column. The fertilised egg develops into a planula larva which becomes part of the zooplankton and later settles and develops into a new individual. The species can also reproduce asexually by the liberation of "ciliated germs" through the walls of the lower column.
