= Kyopoda =

Scientific classification
- Domain: Eukaryota
- Kingdom: Animalia
- Phylum: Cnidaria
- Class: Staurozoa
- Order: Stauromedusae
- Suborder: Myostaurida
- Family: Kyopodiidae; Larson, 1988
- Genus: Kyopoda; Larson, 1988
- Species: K. lamberti

Binomial name
- Kyopoda lamberti Larson, 1988

Genus of jellyfishes

Kyopoda is a genus of stalked jellyfish, It has only one species in the genus, Kyopoda lamberti, and is in turn the only genus in the family Kyopodiidiae.

The species was described from British Columbia and California and placed in a new genus and family, since it did not have the stomach and sex organs in the usual structure known as the calyx, but in a sac at the base of the stalk of its worm-like body that is no smaller than 2 cm in length when fully developed. The mouth is a squarish bone with which the jaw jointed in a similar way as the incus of the middle ear in mammals; its lips frilled with tiny hairs. It has eight adjacent capitate tentacles that are located near the calyx, which is short with no arm lobes. The outer tentacles have gland cells about halfway down facing away from the center. It has eight primary tentacles located in between the secondary tentacles that have the same structure as the outer tentacles, but shorter and thicker. The calyx contain the stomodeum (the embryonic anterior ectodermal part of the digestive tract.) and four perradial gastric cavities (gastric pouch of Aurelia which is another jelly) which extend through the stalk and into the gastric sac. The most common color for this animal is purple with white spots around the calyx. This may be an adaptation for their subtidal habitat, where they face strong waves. They live attached to bare rocks or coralline algae-covered rocks at a depth of 8 to 14–m. The family has been placed within the suborder Myostaurida.
