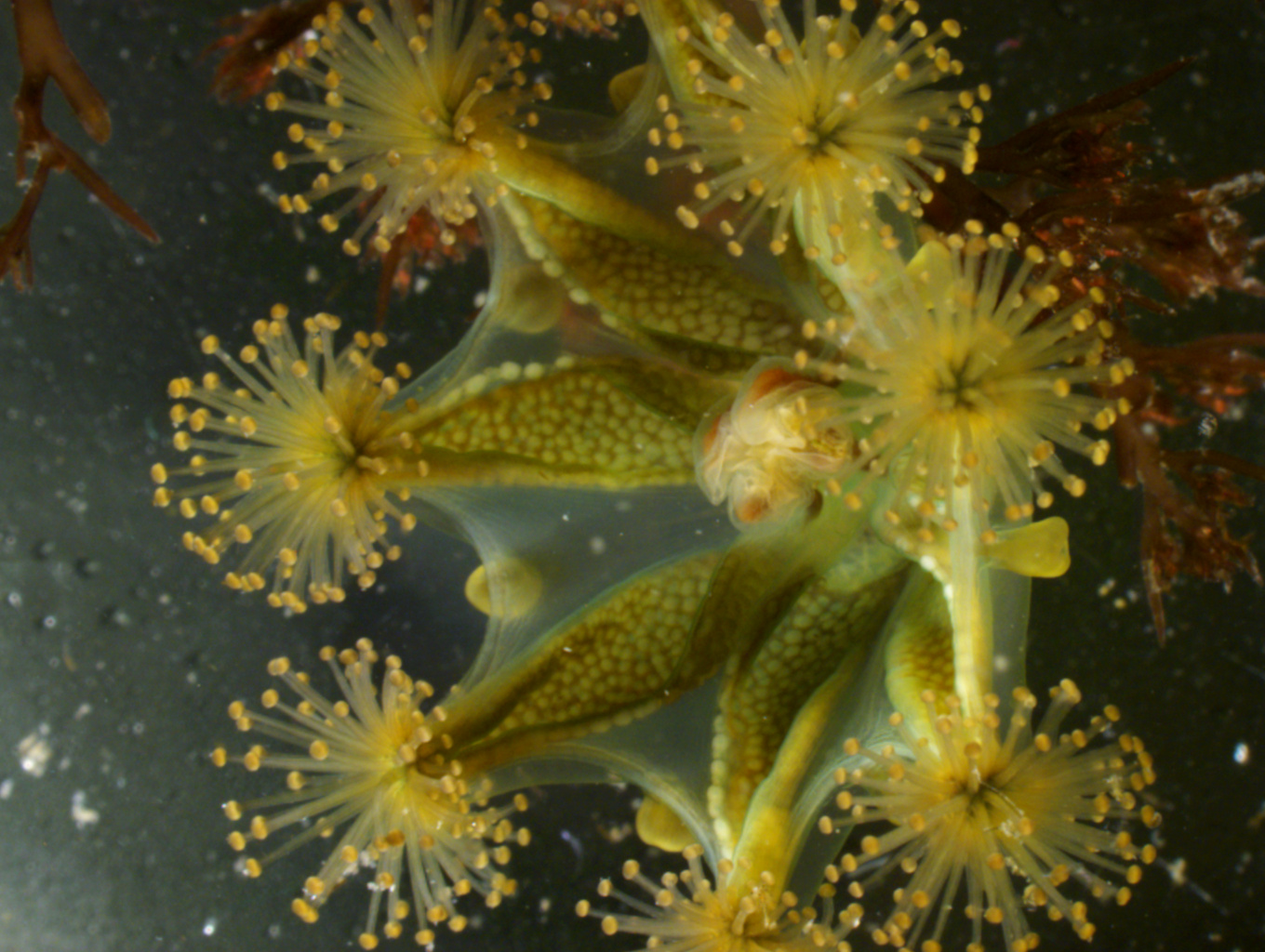
- Haliclystus sanjuanensis

Scientific classification
- Kingdom: Animalia
- Phylum: Cnidaria
- Class: Staurozoa
- Order: Stauromedusae
- Suborder: Myostaurida
- Family: Haliclystidae; Haeckel, 1879

Genera
- See text

= Haliclystidae =

Family of jellyfishes

Haliclystidae is a family of stalked jellyfish in the order Stauromedusae.

== Gallery ==
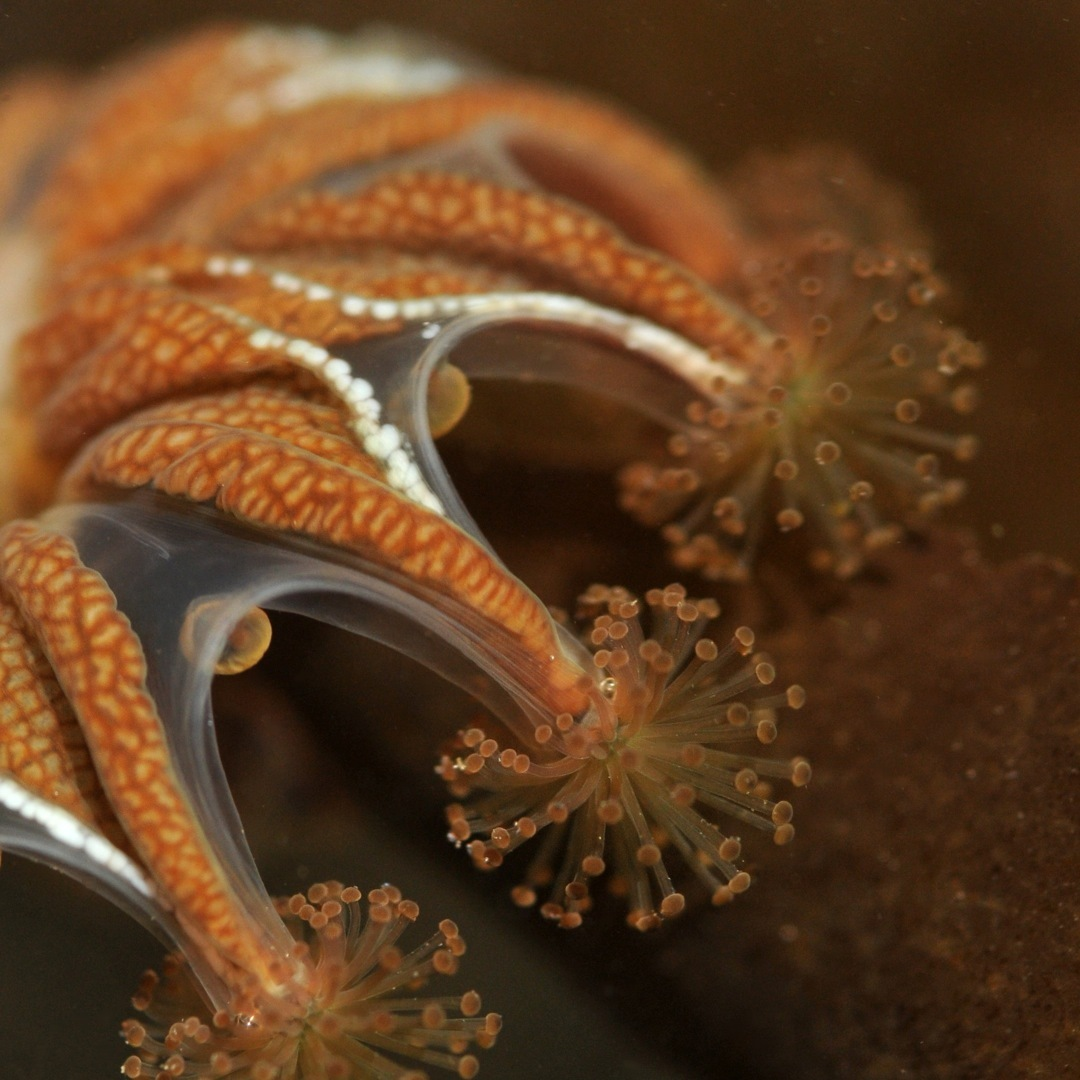
Haliclystus sp.

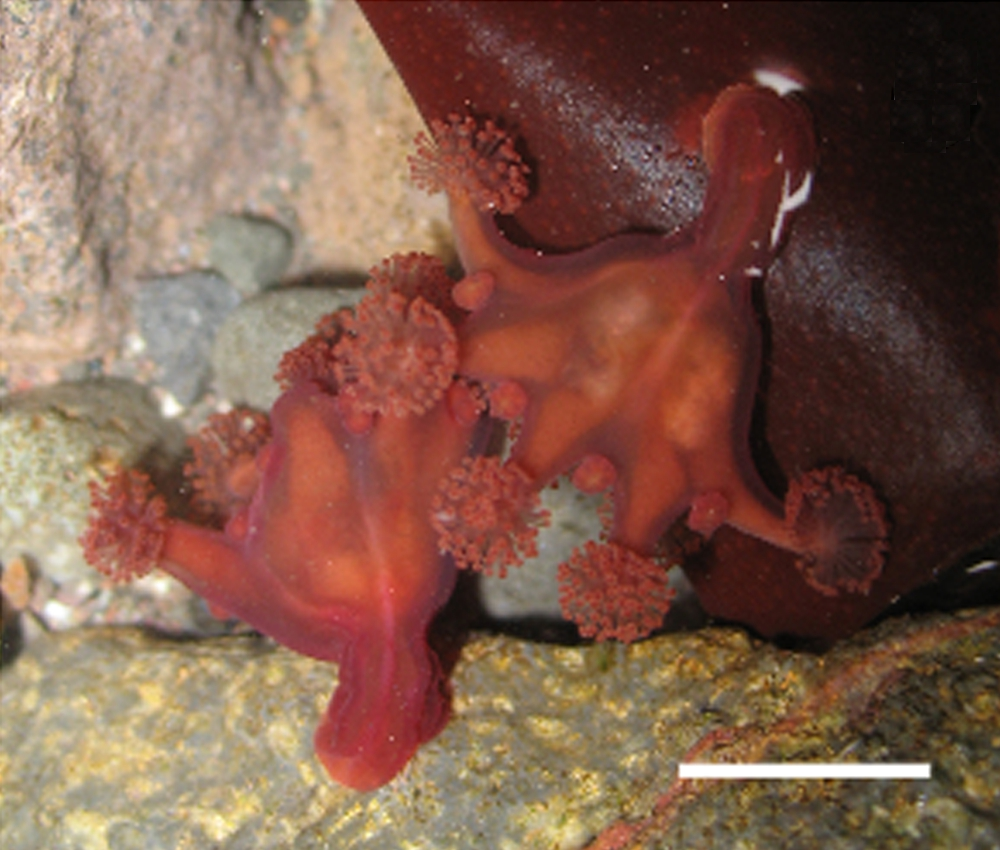
Haliclystus antarcticus

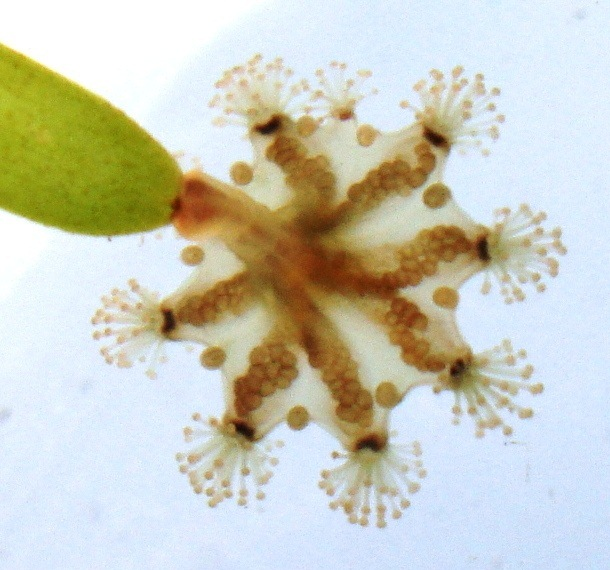
Haliclystus octoradiatus

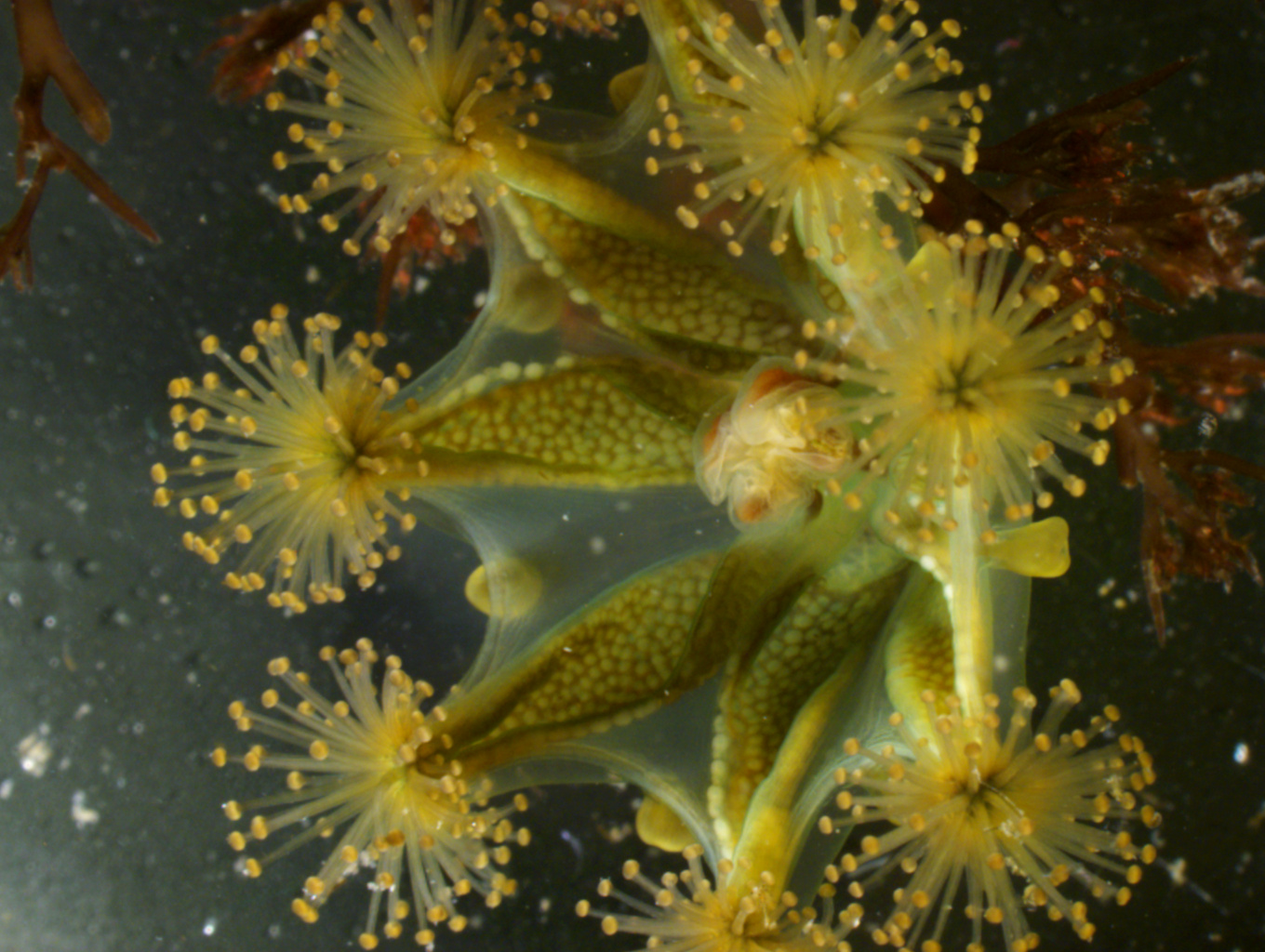
Haliclystus sanjuanensis

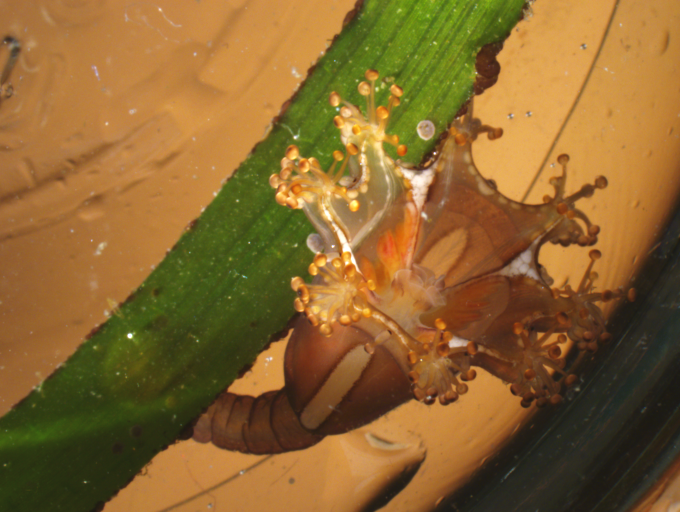
Manania handi

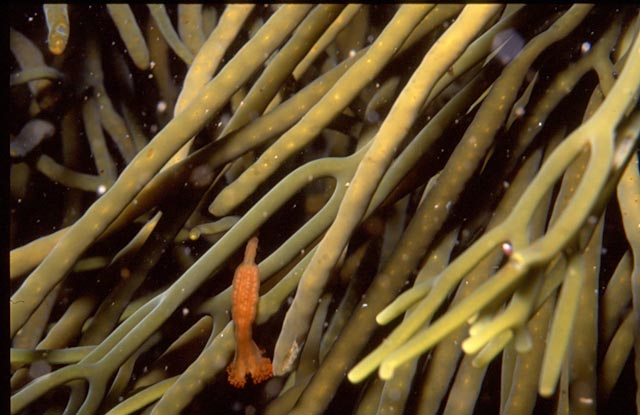
Depastromorpha africana

== Genera and species ==
According to the World Register of Marine Species, the following genera and species are found in this family:

- Depastromorpha Carlgren, 1935
  - Depastromorpha africana Carlgren, 1935
- Depastrum Gosse, 1858
  - Depastrum cyathiforme (M. Sars, 1846)
- Haliclystus James-Clark, 1863
  - Haliclystus antarcticus Pfeffer, 1889
  - Haliclystus auricula James-Clark, 1863
  - Haliclystus borealis Uchida, 1933
  - Haliclystus californiensis Kahn, Matsumoto, Hirano & Collins, 2010
  - Haliclystus inabai (Kishinouye, 1893)
  - Haliclystus kerguelensis Vanhöffen, 1908
  - Haliclystus monstrosus (Naumov, 1961)
  - Haliclystus octoradiatus James-Clark, 1863
  - Haliclystus salpinx James-Clark, 1863
  - Haliclystus sanjuanensis Mills, Westlake, Hirano & Miranda, 2023
  - Haliclystus sinensis Ling, 1937
  - Haliclystus stejnegeri Kishinouye, 1899
  - Haliclystus tenuis Kishinouye, 1910
- Halimocyathus James-Clark, 1863
  - Halimocyathus platypus James-Clark, 1863
- Manania James-Clark, 1863
  - Manania atlantica (Berrill, 1962)
  - Manania auricula (Fabricius, 1780)
  - Manania distincta (Kishinouye, 1910)
  - Manania gwilliami Larson & Fautin, 1989
  - Manania handi Larson & Fautin, 1989
  - Manania hexaradiata (Broch, 1907)
  - Manania uchidai (Naumov, 1961)
