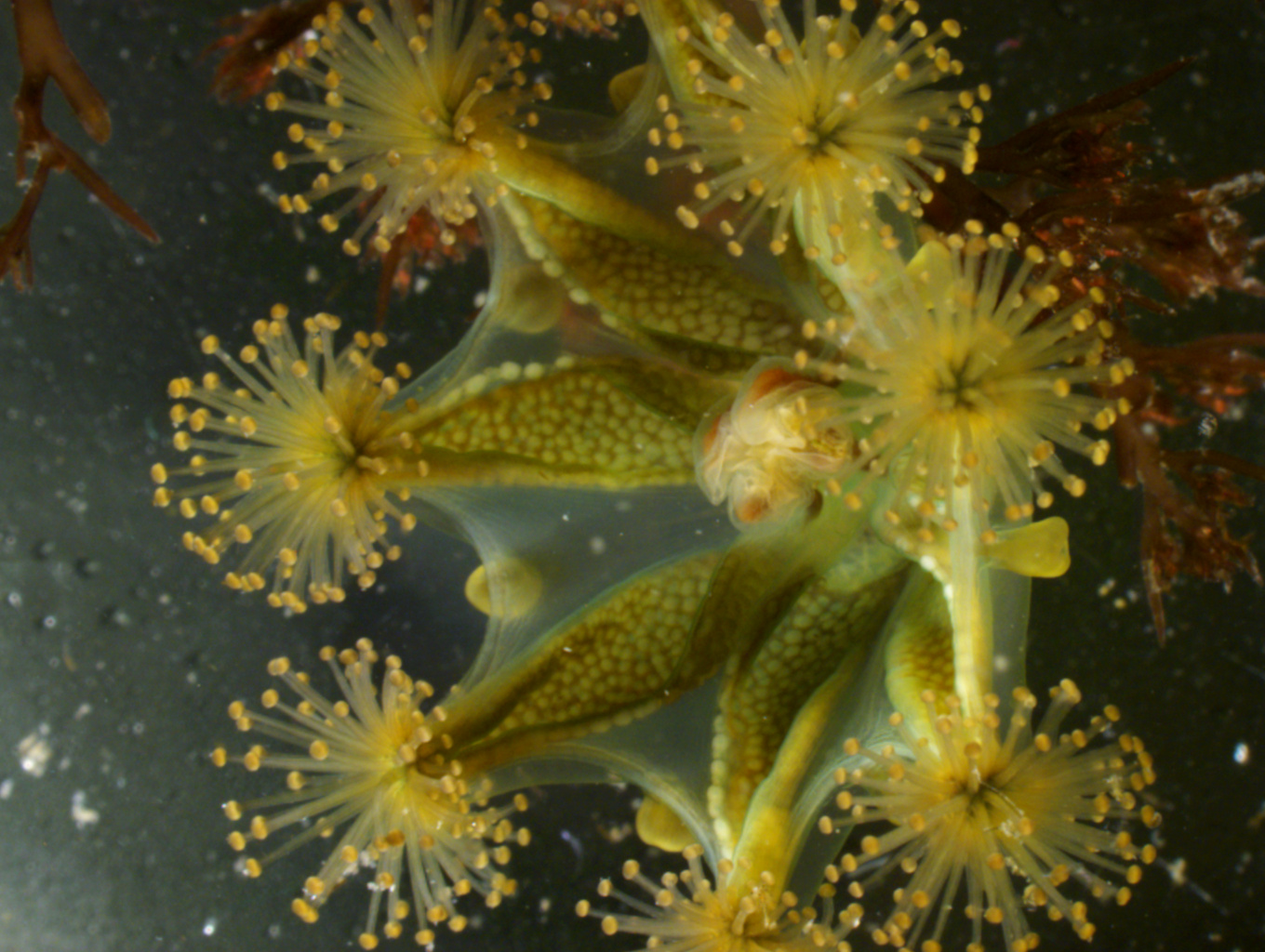
- Haliclystus sanjuanensis

Scientific classification
- Kingdom: Animalia
- Phylum: Cnidaria
- Class: Staurozoa
- Order: Stauromedusae
- Suborder: Myostaurida; Miranda, Hirano, Mills, Falconer, Fenwick, Marques & Collins, 2016

Families
- Haliclystidae; Kyopodiidae; Lipkeidae; Lucernariidae

= Myostaurida =

Suborder of marine invertebrates

Myostaurida is one of two suborders of stalked jellyfishes, the other being Amyostaurida. Species in Myostaurida have—unlike those in Amyostaurida—interradial, longitudinal muscles in their stalks. Myostaurida contains nine genera across four families.
