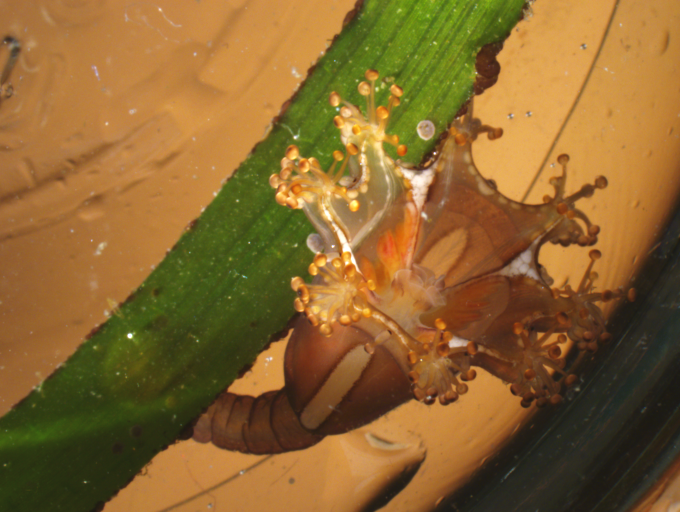
- Manania handi

Scientific classification
- Domain: Eukaryota
- Kingdom: Animalia
- Phylum: Cnidaria
- Class: Staurozoa
- Order: Stauromedusae
- Family: Haliclystidae
- Genus: Manania
- Species: M. handi

Binomial name
- Manania handi Larson and Fautin, 1989

= Manania handi =

Species of jellyfish

Manania handi is a species of stalked jellyfish found in the Pacific Ocean along the west coast of North America. This species can be found in shallow waters at low tide on soft substrates such as seagrass (Phyllospadix), but the related M. gwilliami have also been recovered at depths of >10 metres. This may reflect that intertidal specimens represent the fringes of a population that is typically more commonly found in the subtidal zone.

== Description ==
Manania handi reaches a length of up to 4 cm, but the diameter of the bell at the oral end is relatively narrow at approximately 2 cm in fully-grown specimens. Distinctive pigment bands along the calyx and the relatively short stalk (or peduncle) distinguish it from related Manania species. Manania handi is also described typically as green with cream coloured gonads and vivid white nematocyst vesicles. However the colour patterns of M. handi can vary from brownish-yellow to vivid green. The name "handi" refers to Cadet Hand, major professor of G.F. Gwilliam and co-author with Gwilliam on a number of studies describing Stauromedusae species.

== Gallery ==
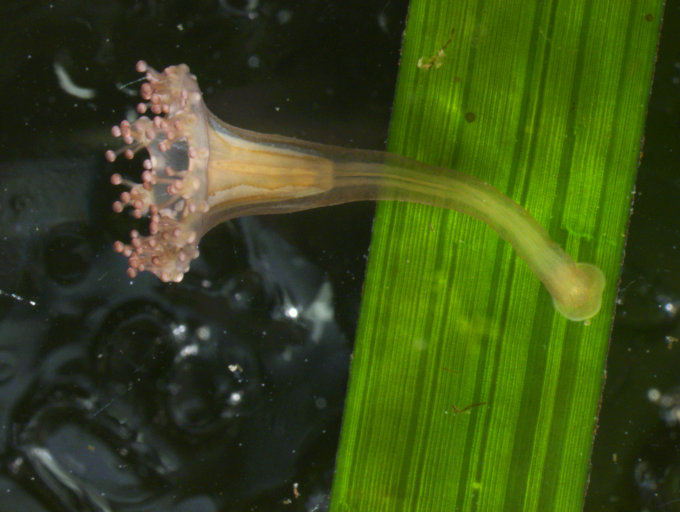
Juvenile Manania handi specimen

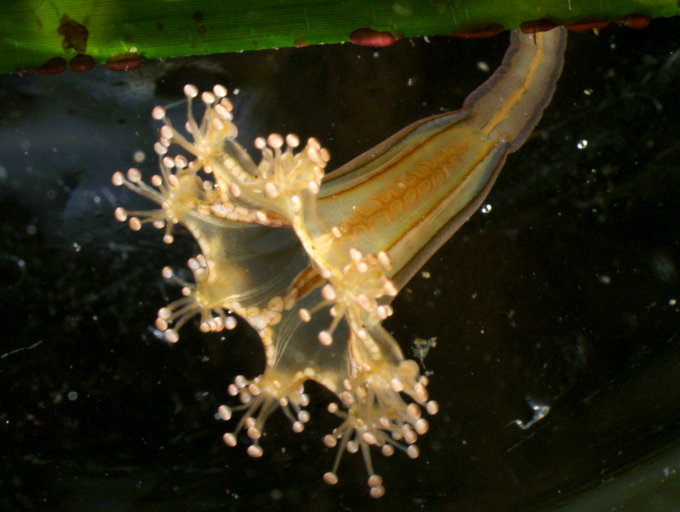
Juvenile Manania handi specimen

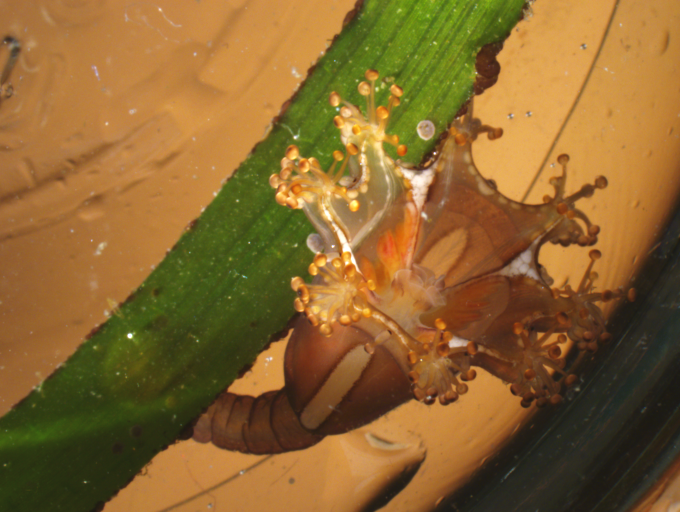
Manania handi showing the pigment bands along the calyx

=== Disambiguation ===
In Gwilliam (1956), this species is referred to as "Manania prasinus."
