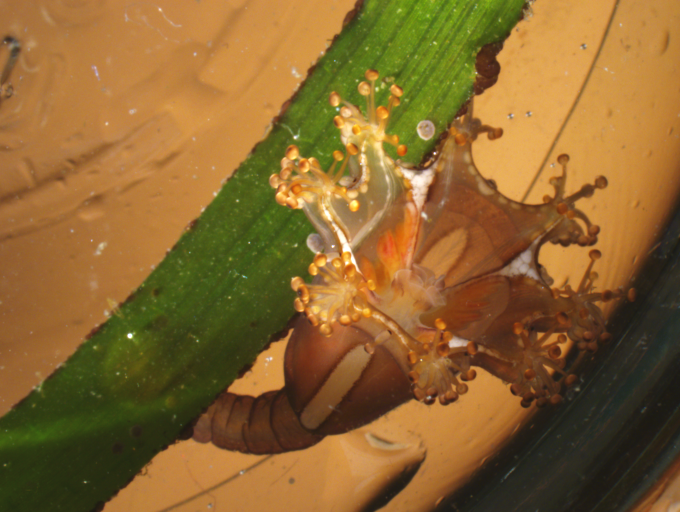
- Manania handi

Scientific classification
- Domain: Eukaryota
- Kingdom: Animalia
- Phylum: Cnidaria
- Class: Staurozoa
- Order: Stauromedusae
- Family: Haliclystidae
- Genus: Manania; James-Clark, 1863

Species
- see text

= Manania =

Genus of jellyfishes

Manania are a genus of stalked jellyfish in the family Haliclystidae.

== Species ==
The following lists described species of Manania :

- Manania atlantica (Berrill, 1962)
- Manania auricula (Fabricius, 1780)
- Manania distincta (Kishinouye, 1910)
- Manania gwilliami Larson & Fautin, 1989
- Manania handi Larson & Fautin, 1989
- Manania hexaradiata (Broch, 1907)
- Manania uchidai (Naumov, 1961)
