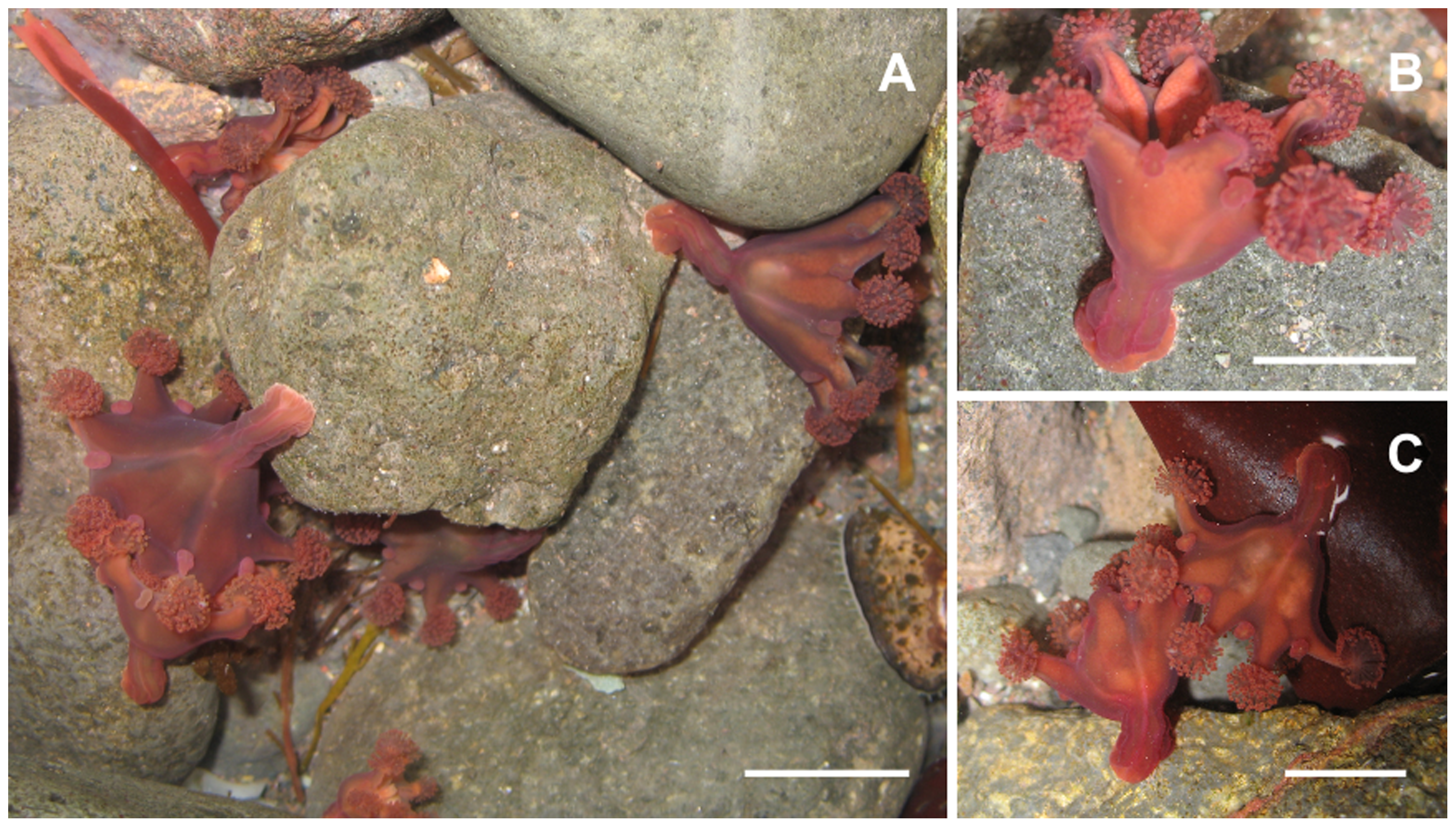
- Haliclystus antarcticus

Scientific classification
- Kingdom: Animalia
- Phylum: Cnidaria
- Class: Staurozoa
- Order: Stauromedusae
- Family: Haliclystidae
- Genus: Haliclystus; James-Clark, 1863

Species
- Haliclystus antarcticus; Haliclystus auricula; Haliclystus borealis; Haliclystus californiensis; Haliclystus kerguelensis; Haliclystus monstrosus; Haliclystus octoradiatus; Haliclystus salpinx; Haliclystus sinensis; Haliclystus stejnegeri; Haliclystus tenuis; Haliclystus sanjuanensis

= Haliclystus =

Genus of jellyfishes

Haliclystus is a genus of stalked jellyfish that contains 13 species.

== Distribution ==
It is the largest genus in the order Stauromedusae. Members of this genus are found in the Pacific, Atlantic, Indian, Arctic, and Southern oceans. Two members of this genus, Haliclystus kerguelensis and Haliclystus antarcticus, are found in the Southern hemisphere only. The remaining 11 members are found in the Northern hemisphere only.

== Description ==
Species in this genus have four longitudinal planes of symmetry. They have eight arms which are tipped with clusters of secondary tentacles. The number of these secondary tentacles is reported to vary across the different species. Species in this genus also have eight large pads known as anchors located between the arms. These vary in size and shape and currently play in important role in differentiating one species from another. Some, but not all, species in this genus have prominent white nematocyst clusters. The 'stalk' or peduncle in this genus is four chambered.

At least one group of scientists has suggested that the taxonomy of this genus needs to be revised.
