= Halimocyathus =

Scientific classification
- Kingdom: Animalia
- Phylum: Cnidaria
- Class: Staurozoa
- Order: Stauromedusae
- Family: Haliclystidae
- Genus: Halimocyathus; James-Clark, 1863
- Species: H. platypus

Binomial name
- Halimocyathus platypus James-Clark, 1863

Genus of jellyfish

Halimocyathus is a genus of stalked jellyfish in the family Haliclystidae. It is monotypic, containing the sole species Halimocyathus platypus.

The original specimen recorded by Clark in 1863 was found in the Massachusetts Bay attached to some Zostera marina seagrass. It distribution is unknown with a single other observation in the Bay of Fundy, Canada recorded by the Global Biodiversity Information Facility.

Halimocyathus platypus has a deep funnel disk 6mm wide with a stork of 10mm high. It has eight arms that are twice as long as they are broad each with 17–20 tick tentacles arranged in five rows.
