= Depastrum =

Scientific classification
- Kingdom: Animalia
- Phylum: Cnidaria
- Class: Staurozoa
- Order: Stauromedusae
- Family: Haliclystidae
- Genus: Depastrum; Gosse, 1858
- Species: D. cyathiforme

Binomial name
- Depastrum cyathiforme M. Sars, 1846

Genus of jellyfish

Depastrum is a genus of stalked jellyfish in the family Haliclystidae. It is monotypic, containing the sole species Depastrum cyathiforme. The genus was feared extinct having not been seen by humans since 1976, but two of the stalked jellyfish were found to be living on the Scottish island of South Uist in 2023 and 2025.

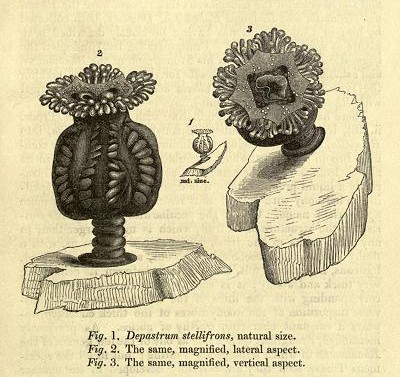
Philip Henry Gosse, Depastrum cyathiforme.
