= Manania gwilliami =

Scientific classification
- Domain: Eukaryota
- Kingdom: Animalia
- Phylum: Cnidaria
- Class: Staurozoa
- Order: Stauromedusae
- Family: Haliclystidae
- Genus: Manania
- Species: M. gwilliami

Binomial name
- Manania gwilliami Larson and Fautin, 1989

Species of jellyfish

Manania gwilliami is a species of stalked jellyfish found in intertidal and subtidal zones on the west coast of North America. The stalk (peduncle) is described as being as long or longer than the calyx; the calyx typically has mottled pigmentation throughout. The name "gwilliami" refers to G.F. Gwilliam who described a number of stauromedusae in the mid-20th century.
