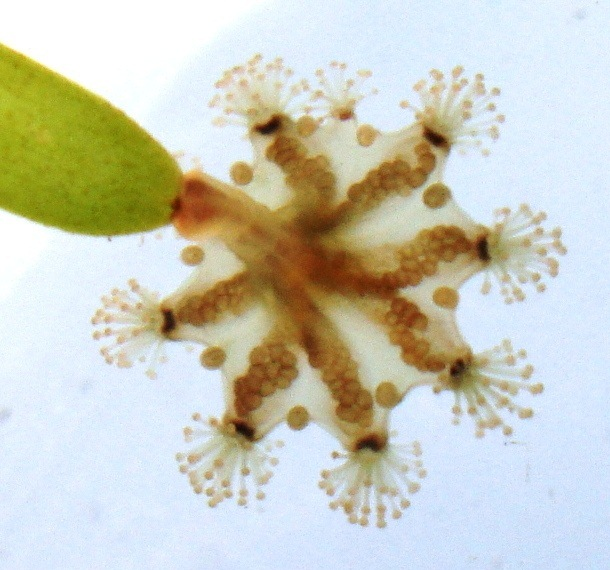

Scientific classification
- Domain: Eukaryota
- Kingdom: Animalia
- Phylum: Cnidaria
- Class: Staurozoa
- Order: Stauromedusae
- Family: Haliclystidae
- Genus: Haliclystus
- Species: H. octoradiatus

Binomial name
- Haliclystus octoradiatus James-Clark, 1863

= Haliclystus octoradiatus =

Species of jellyfish

Haliclystus octoradiatus, common name spotted kaleidoscope jellyfish, is a stalked jellyfish in the family Lucernariidae.

== Description ==
The bell of large specimens may be 25mm in diameter. However, specimens with a 10mm bell is far more commonly observed.

The colour varies greatly. Specimens that appear quite opaque may be orange-brown, olive-brown, red, orange, or may appear locally green. Specimens that seem more translucent may appear brown and aqua, or almost white in colour.

The morphology and colour of the calyx may differ greatly from specimen to specimen. The primary tentacles (anchors) may range in appearance from orbicular to suborbicular. The length of the calyx and stalk are approximately the same. There are 30 to 120 secondary tentacles arranged in clusters at the tip of the arms. Each conad contains 10 to 70 gonadal sacs.

This species is commonly mis-recorded as Haliclystus auricula. It was separated from this species in 1997. Although similar in appearance, there are white nematocyst clusters present in both perradii and interradii of Haliclystus octoradiatus. Also, the anchors of Haliclystus octoradiatus are large, globular, and knob-shaped.

== Distribution ==
This species is abundant in the waters off the coast of Cornwall. There, it is likely the most observed species in the genus Haliclystus.

== Diet ==
Haliclystus octoradiatus has been seen eating small invertebrates, amphipods, and sea spiders.
