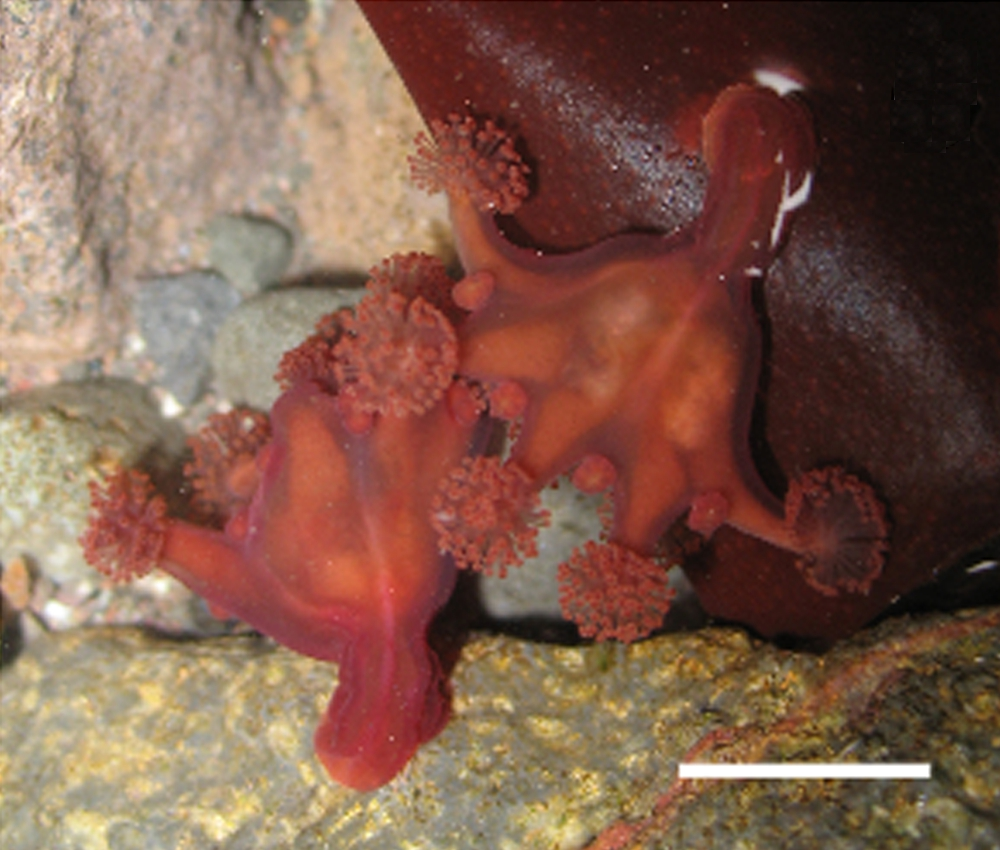

Scientific classification
- Kingdom: Animalia
- Phylum: Cnidaria
- Class: Staurozoa
- Order: Stauromedusae
- Family: Haliclystidae
- Genus: Haliclystus
- Species: H. antarcticus

Binomial name
- Haliclystus antarcticus Pfeffer, 1889

Synonyms
- Microhydrula limopsicola

= Haliclystus antarcticus =

Species of jellyfish

Haliclystus antarcticus is a stalked jellyfish which lives on rocky shore lines in the Southern hemisphere.

== Description ==
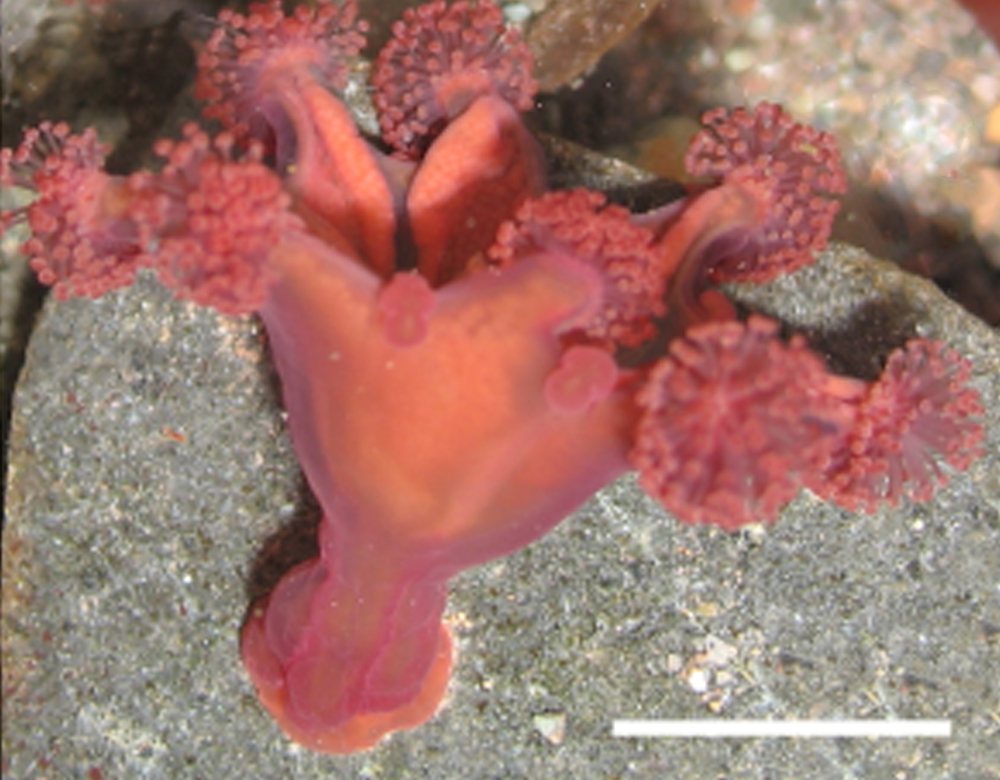
Living specimen attached to rock (scale bar: 1.2 cm)

The original type specimens for this species have been lost. However the species was re-described in 2009. Individuals vary in colour from red-orange with light red gonads (individuals found at King George Island, Antarctica) to red and/or green (individuals found in Valdivia, Chile). Haliclystus antarcticus has a 'stalk' (peduncle) which is half to two-thirds the length of its calyx. The inside of the peduncle is divided into four chambers. The calyx itself is about 3.5–16.2 mm tall and 4.1–23.4 mm wide. It is cone-shaped and semi-translucent with a smooth outer surface. The animal has eight arms arranged in pairs which radiate out from a central four-sided mouth. The arms are 0.3–6.0 mm in length. Each arm is tipped by clusters of up to roughly 200 tentacles which are hollow and tipped with a rounded end covered in nematocysts. The arms are connected by a thin membrane. Primary tentacles known as anchors are located on the membrane margin between the arms. The shape of these varies with age. In very young individuals (just after metamorphosis to medusae) they are circular, in juveniles they are triangular, in older organisms they are shaped like the figure '8' and have a longitudinal furrow and a wrinkled surface.

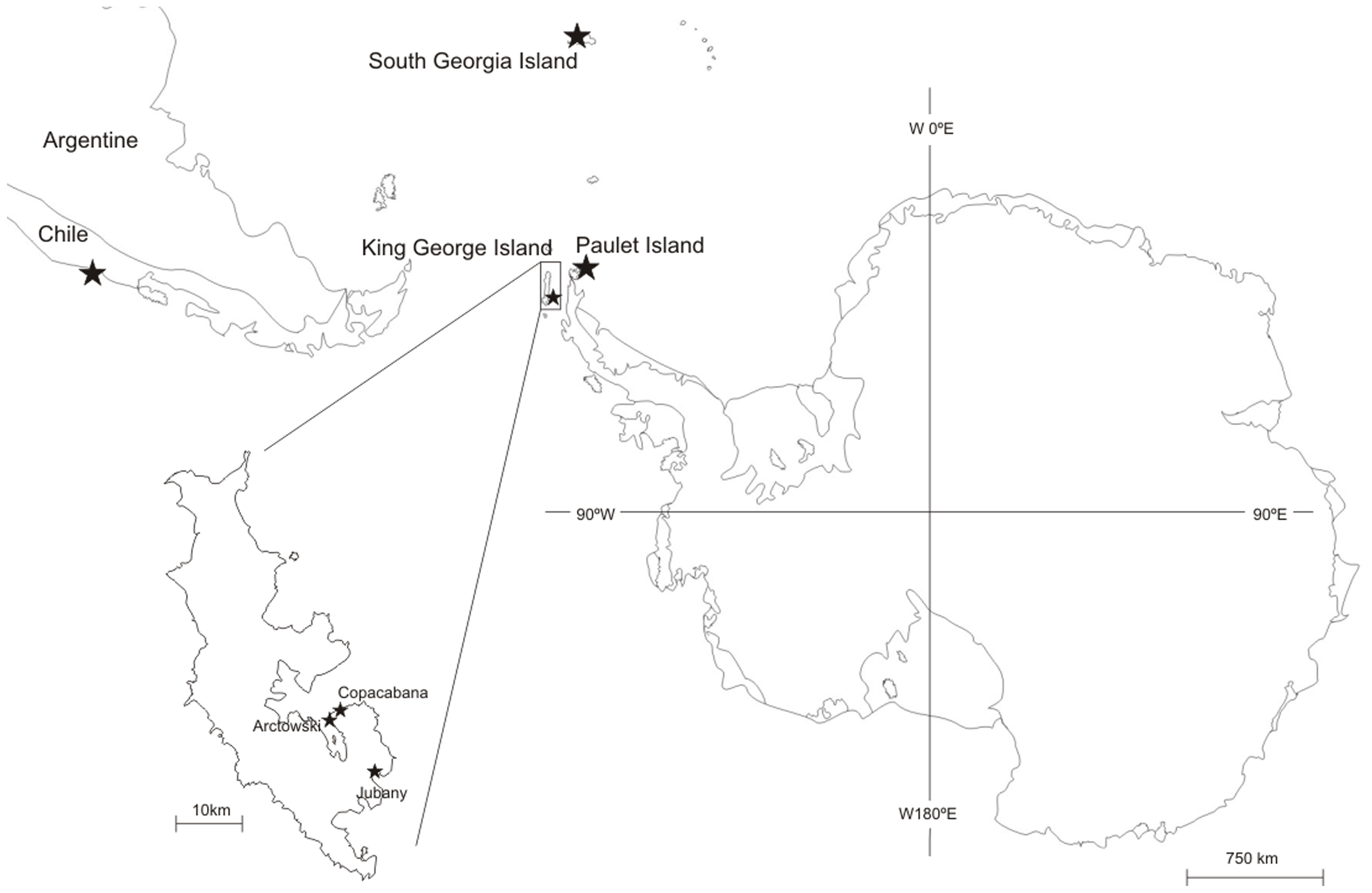
Locations where H. antarcticus has been found (stars)

== Distribution ==
H. antarcticus is one of only two species of Haliclystus which inhabit the Southern hemisphere. It was first identified living in the waters of South Georgia Island, Antarctica. Its presence has since been reported in several locations in Antarctica with probable sightings in Chile and Argentina.

== Habitat ==
Scientists believe that as H. antarticus individuals grow they become too heavy for the algae to which they attach themselves in the juvenile form. They then choose to relocate to another substrate where they are able to attach themselves more firmly. In a study of individuals in Chile sexually-immature individuals were found exclusively on Ceramium virgatum. Individuals which had reached sexual maturity were found on other substrates including marine eelgrass and the other algae. In a study of individuals from South Georgia Island small animals were found on the macroalga Desmarestia menziesii while larger animals were found on the underside of boulders.

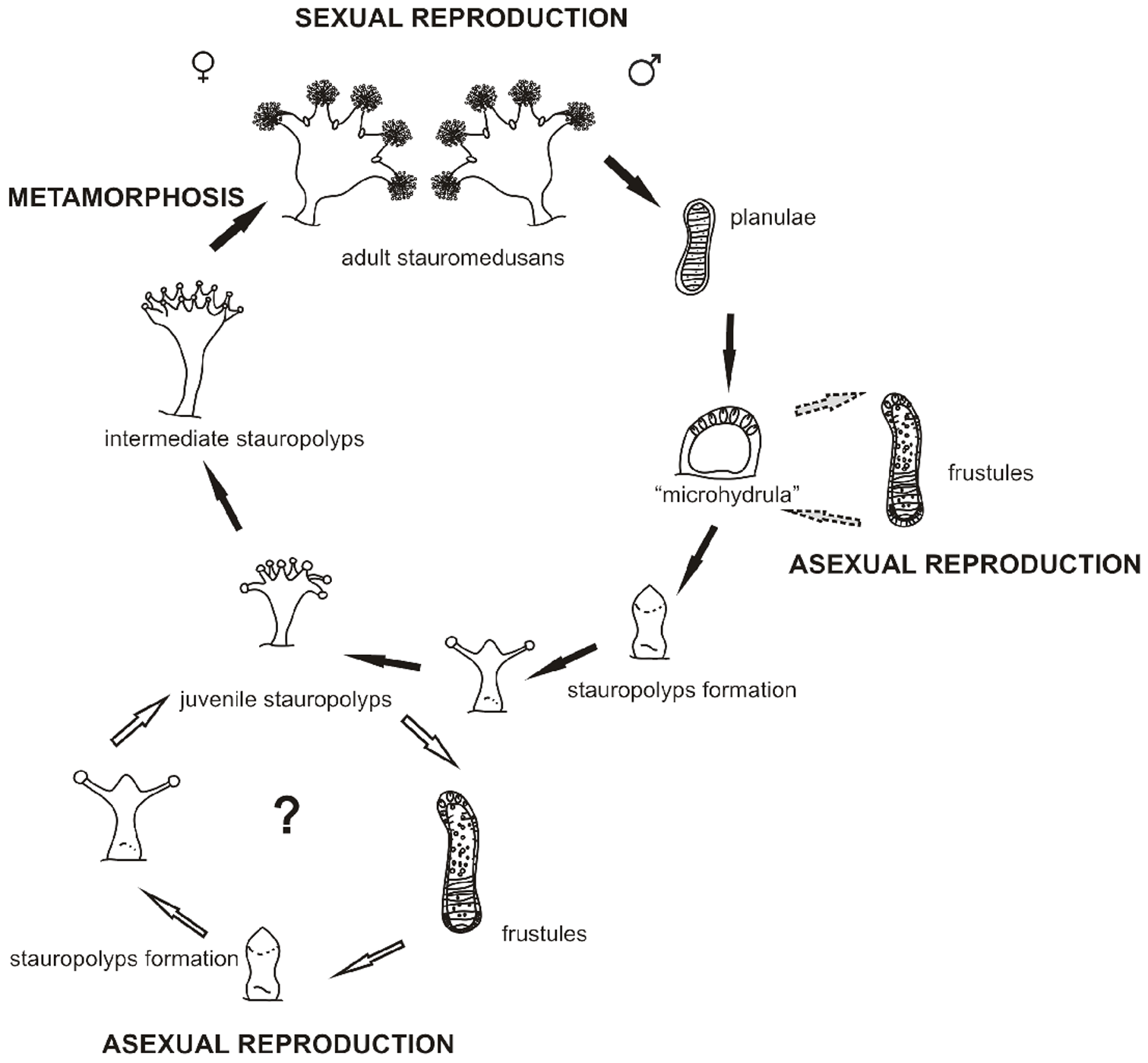
Putative scheme of the life cycle of H. antarcticus, including the "microhydrula" phase as proposed by Miranda et al. 2010.

== Feeding ==
Examination of the contents of H.antarcticus stomachs has revealed that these organisms consume mostly small crustaceans and fly larvae. Individuals with an umbrella height less than 0.4 mm do not appear to eat. These individuals are believed not to have yet developed all of their secondary tentacles and they are therefore unable to catch prey. Scientists believe that H. antarcticus eats the largest prey it can handle.

The largest individuals from South Georgia Island, Antarctica were found to consume calanoid copepods, while smaller individuals ate amphipods. The greatest proportion of the food of the individuals from Chile appeared to be harpacticoid copepods followed by gammarid amphipods, chironomid fly larvae and podocopid ostracods. The remainder of the diet included empidid fly larvae, polychaete worms, isopods, juvenile decapod crustaceans and gastropods. Smaller adult individuals from the Chile population appeared to eat mostly the copepods, while larger animals ate mostly amphipods.

== Lifecycle ==
A recent genetic analysis has suggested that Microhydrula limopsicola, originally classified as a member of the order Limnomedusae, is in fact a developmental stage of Haliclystus antarcticus. In its mature form H. antarcticus has eight gonads which are organised into four pairs and run from the central mouth to the ends of the arms. The gonads are approximately about 1.6–12.9 mm in length and are visible through the wall of the calyx. The gonads are mature in specimens that have a calyx height of about 11.72 mm or greater.

== Predation ==
H. antarcticus is occasionally eaten by the fish Notothenia rossii.
