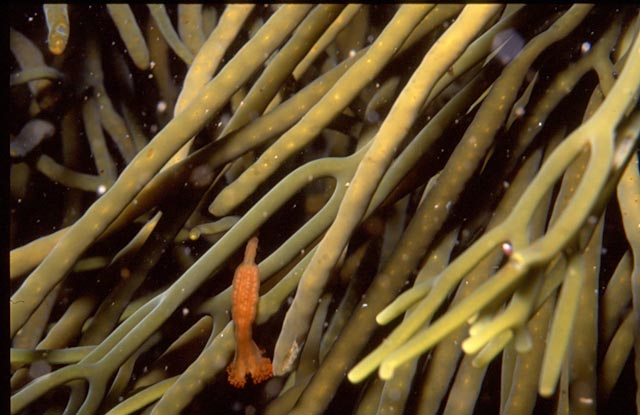

Scientific classification
- Kingdom: Animalia
- Phylum: Cnidaria
- Class: Staurozoa
- Order: Stauromedusae
- Family: Haliclystidae
- Genus: Depastromorpha; Carlgren, 1935
- Species: D. africana

Binomial name
- Depastromorpha africana Carlgren, 1935

= Stalked trumpet jelly =

Species of jellyfish

The stalked trumpet jelly (Depastromorpha africana), is a species of stalked jellyfish in the family Depastridae. It is the only member of the genus Depastromorpha.

== Description ==
This small stalked jellyfish grows up to 2 cm in height and may be pale to reddish in colour. It has a wrinkled body column and multiple stalked tentacles with knobbed ends surrounding the mouth.

== Distribution ==
This species has been found only around the South African coast from the Cape Peninsula to Hermanus from the shore to shallow subtidal. It is possibly endemic to this region.

== Ecology ==
This stalked jelly is usually found on seaweeds, particularly Caulerpa filiformis.
