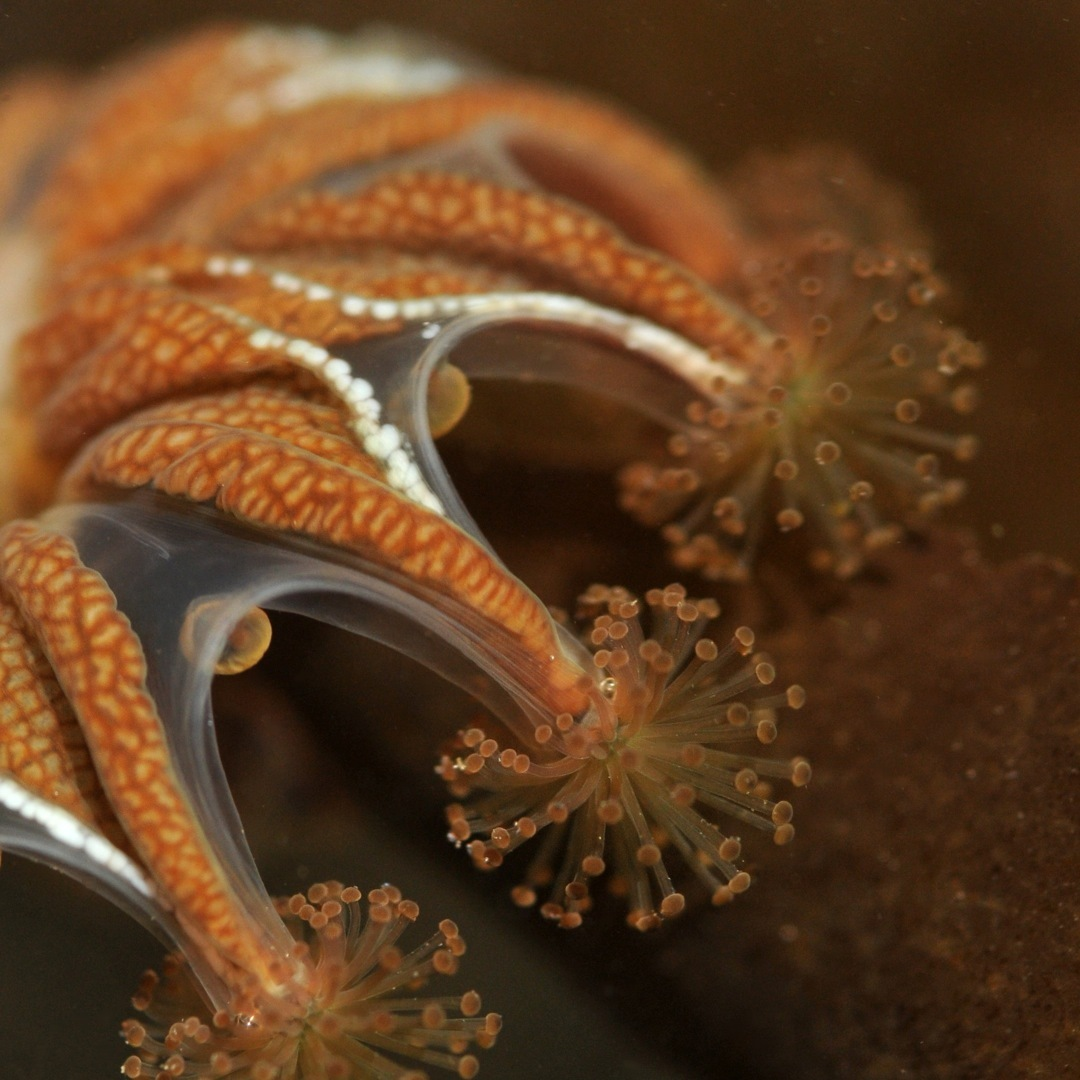
- Haliclystus stejnegeri

Scientific classification
- Domain: Eukaryota
- Kingdom: Animalia
- Phylum: Cnidaria
- Class: Staurozoa
- Order: Stauromedusae
- Family: Haliclystidae
- Genus: Haliclystus
- Species: H. stejnegeri

Binomial name
- Haliclystus stejnegeri Kishinouye, 1899

= Haliclystus stejnegeri =

Species of stalked jellyfish

Haliclystus stejnegeri is a species of stalked jellyfish in the family Haliclystidae.
