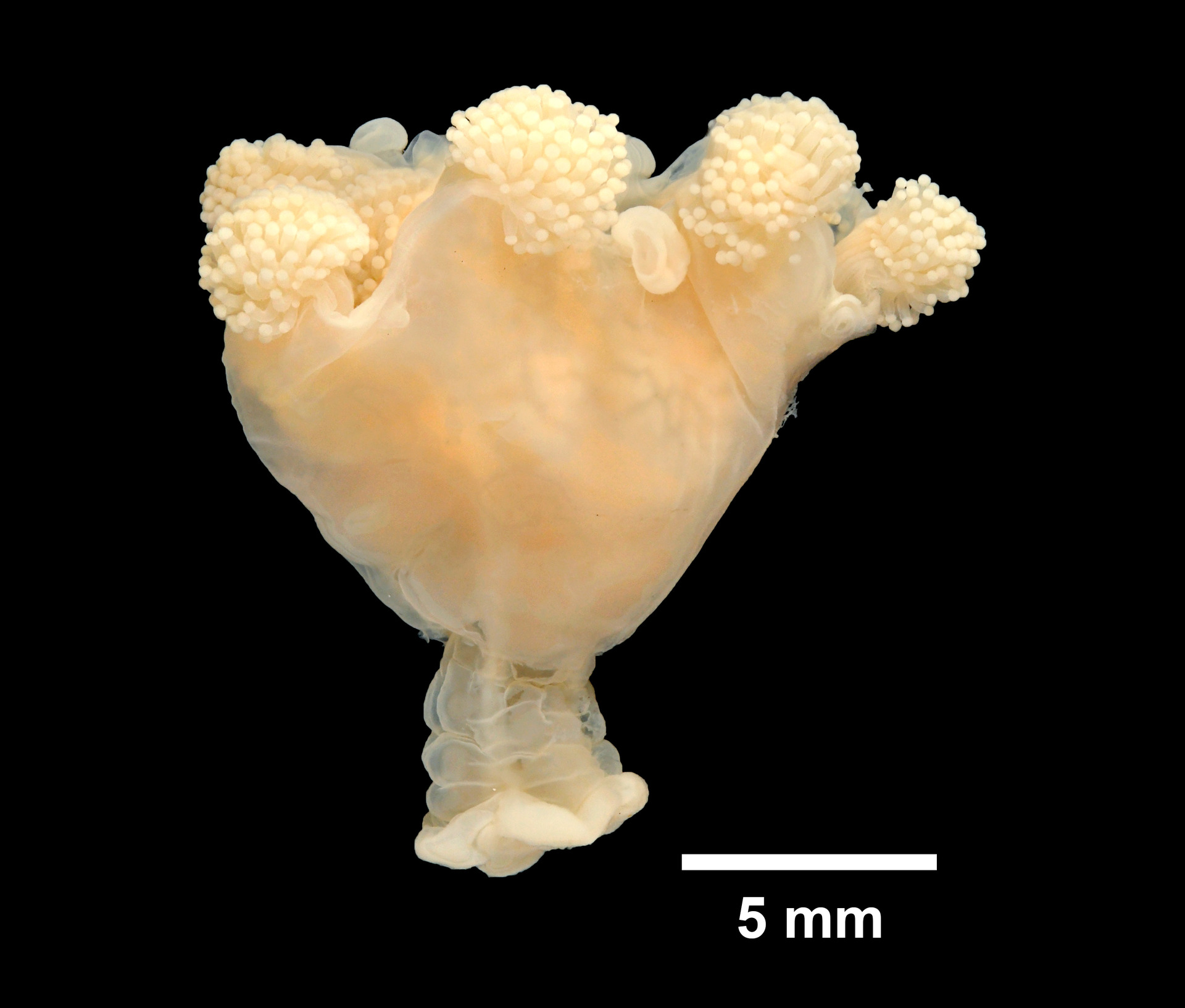

Scientific classification
- Kingdom: Animalia
- Phylum: Cnidaria
- Class: Staurozoa
- Order: Stauromedusae
- Family: Haliclystidae
- Genus: Haliclystus
- Species: H. auricula

Binomial name
- Haliclystus auricula Rathke, 1806

Synonyms
- Lucernaria auricula

= Haliclystus auricula =

Species of jellyfish

Haliclystus auricula is a stalked jellyfish or Kaleidoscope jellyfish named for its shape resembling a funnel-shaped kaleidoscope that has eight arms typically found in the Northern Hemisphere. The Staurozoan is classified within the phylum Cnidaria under the kingdom Animalia. Under its genus, H. auricula is considered the type species.

== Taxonomy ==
The defining morphological characteristic for H. auricula is the presence of a tentacular cluster of internal intertentacular lobules. H. auricula also resembles another species called H. antarcticus and as a result of this many scientists go debate on whether or not they exhibit synonymy based on morphological features. The scientific name is credited to James-Clark in 1863. However, in 2010, Natural England, The Guardian and the Oxford University Museum of Natural History ran a competition asking members of the public to provide a common name for this species. The name "Kaleidoscope Jellyfish," submitted by Kepler Petzall, was eventually chosen. Runner-up names included Fractal flower jellyfish and Mermaid's trumpet jellyfish.

== Description ==
H. auricula is 2-2.5cm tall and funnel shaped with a long stalk, a central mouth, and eight radiating arms that can have, at most, 100 kidney-shaped tentacles that are found at the tip that is an identifying feature for this species. The coloring of H. auricula can range from a grey-ish green color to a reddish-brown color and it is likely that they will often blend into the algae that they are attached to. H. auricula is able to move location by attaching a specialized tentacle to the substrate as an anchor, detaching its base and 'cartwheeling' into the new position.

== Distribution ==
H. auricula is one of ten species of Haliclystus found in the Northern hemisphere. Its presence has been noted off the coast of Greenland, Iceland, Portugal, France, Ireland, UK, Germany, northwestern US, around Gulf of St. Lawrence, Baltic Sea, North Sea, and some appearances in the western hemisphere along the coast of South America (specifically Chile and Argentina). It is very sensitive to pollution. The populations along the British coastline are in decline. Distribution includes the Shetland Isles, Orkney, western coast of England, Scotland and Ireland.

== Habitat ==
This species lives among the mid-eulittoral to shallow sublittoral ranges of an intertidal zone with the presence of adequate circulation for marine eelgrass and other algae. H. auricula is often found attached to the variety of species of algae during the warmer months of the year, the algae are called suitable algae substrates. The more favorable conditions for larval habitat would be similar: a large density of macroalgal species, which is dependent on wave action. Depths they are found in range from mid-eulittoral to shallow sublittoral.

== Diet ==
Haliclystus auricula has been found to generally prey on species under the order of Copepods, Amphipods, Ostracods, and Isopods that are often around their attached algae within the intertidal zones. A correlation between the size of the jelly and the type of prey is present, with smaller jellies consuming smaller species such as copepods whereas the larger species consumes a larger species like Amphipods. In order to successfully ensnare their prey, this passive predator uses its stinging nematocysts.

== Lifecycle ==
This species was found to be most abundant and reproduce seasonally most frequently in through the spring and into the late summer, and die off sometime during the autumn. Therefore, Like all stalked jellyfish, a single H. auricula individual is believed to live for only about one year. And since this species is under the order Stauromedusae, this species reproduces by sexual or asexual means and their larval stage ranges between 2-10 days as a planula.
