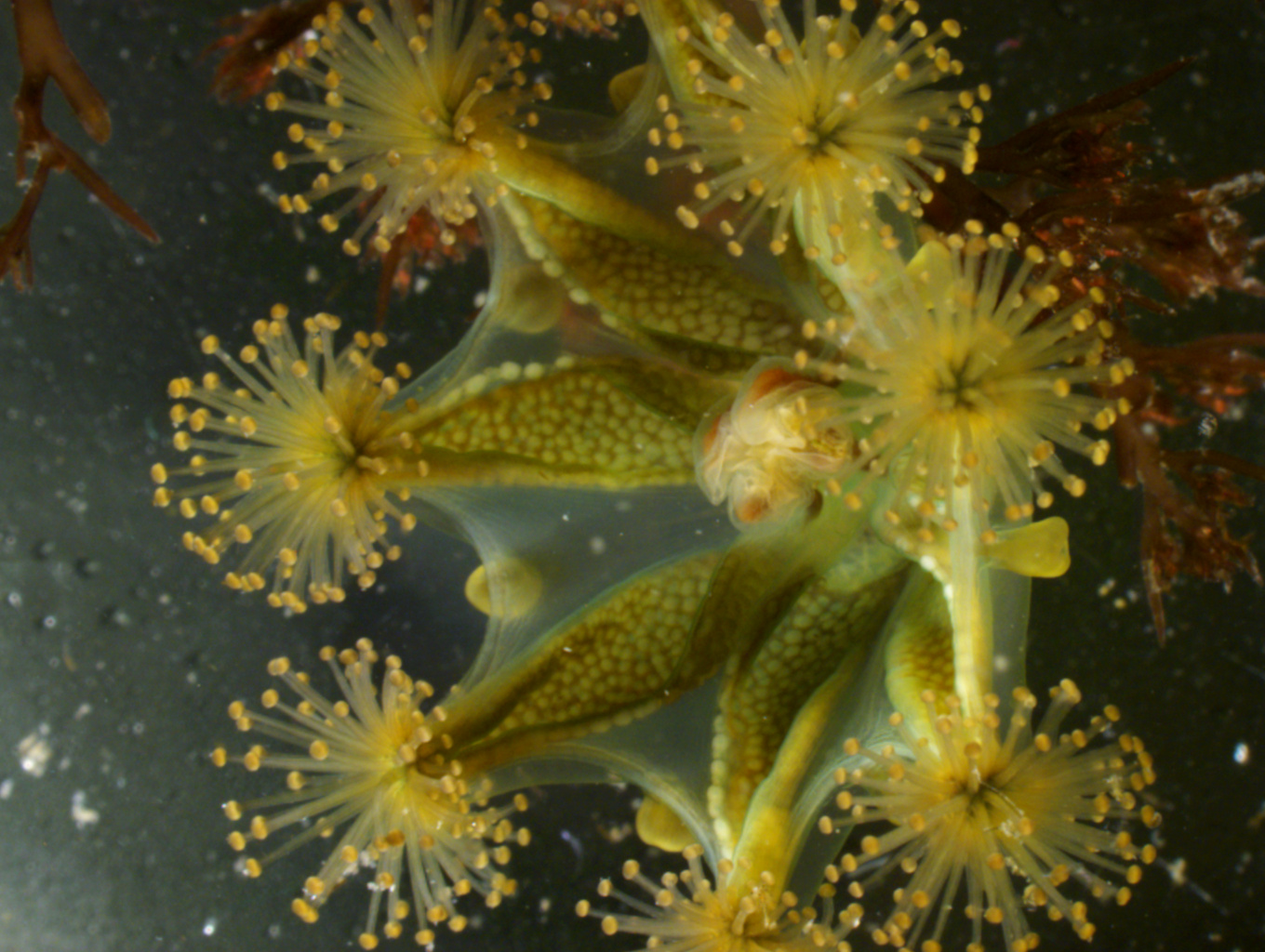
- Haliclystus sanjuanensis

Scientific classification
- Kingdom: Animalia
- Phylum: Cnidaria
- Class: Staurozoa
- Order: Stauromedusae
- Family: Haliclystidae
- Genus: Haliclystus
- Species: H. sanjuanensis

Binomial name
- Haliclystus sanjuanensis Mills, Westlake, Hirano, & Miranda (2023)

= Haliclystus sanjuanensis =

Species of jellyfish

Haliclystus sanjuanensis is a species of small (~4 cm) stalked jellyfish found in the Pacific Ocean along the west coast of North America. This species can be found in shallow waters at low tide on soft substrates such as seagrass (Phyllospadix). A variety of colour morphs can be found ranging from yellow-green to red. Haliclystus sanjuanensis was formally described as a distinct species in 2023, following sequence data establishing it as a distinct taxon.

== Gallery ==
Colour morphs of Haliclystus sanjuanensis:

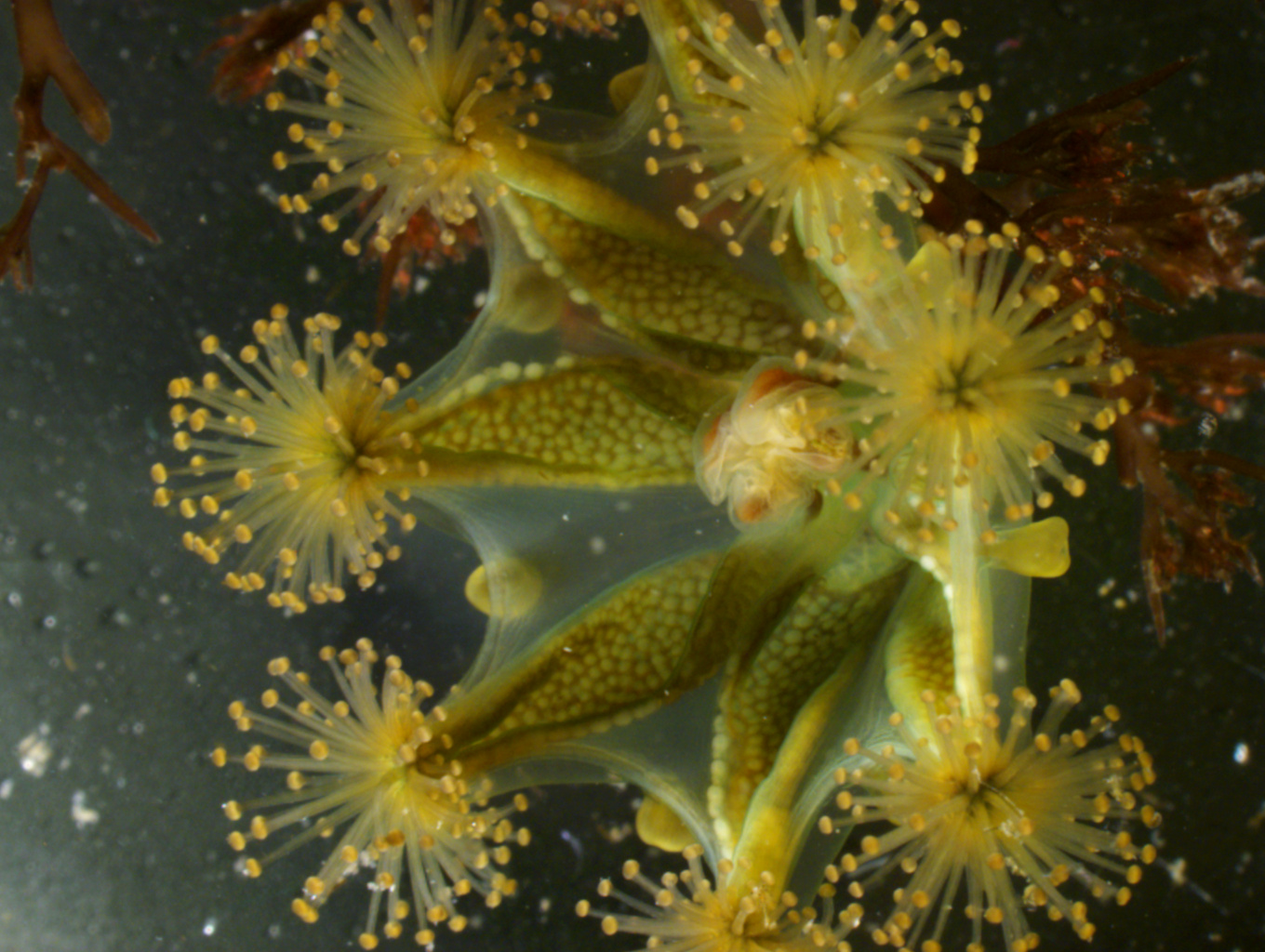
Green

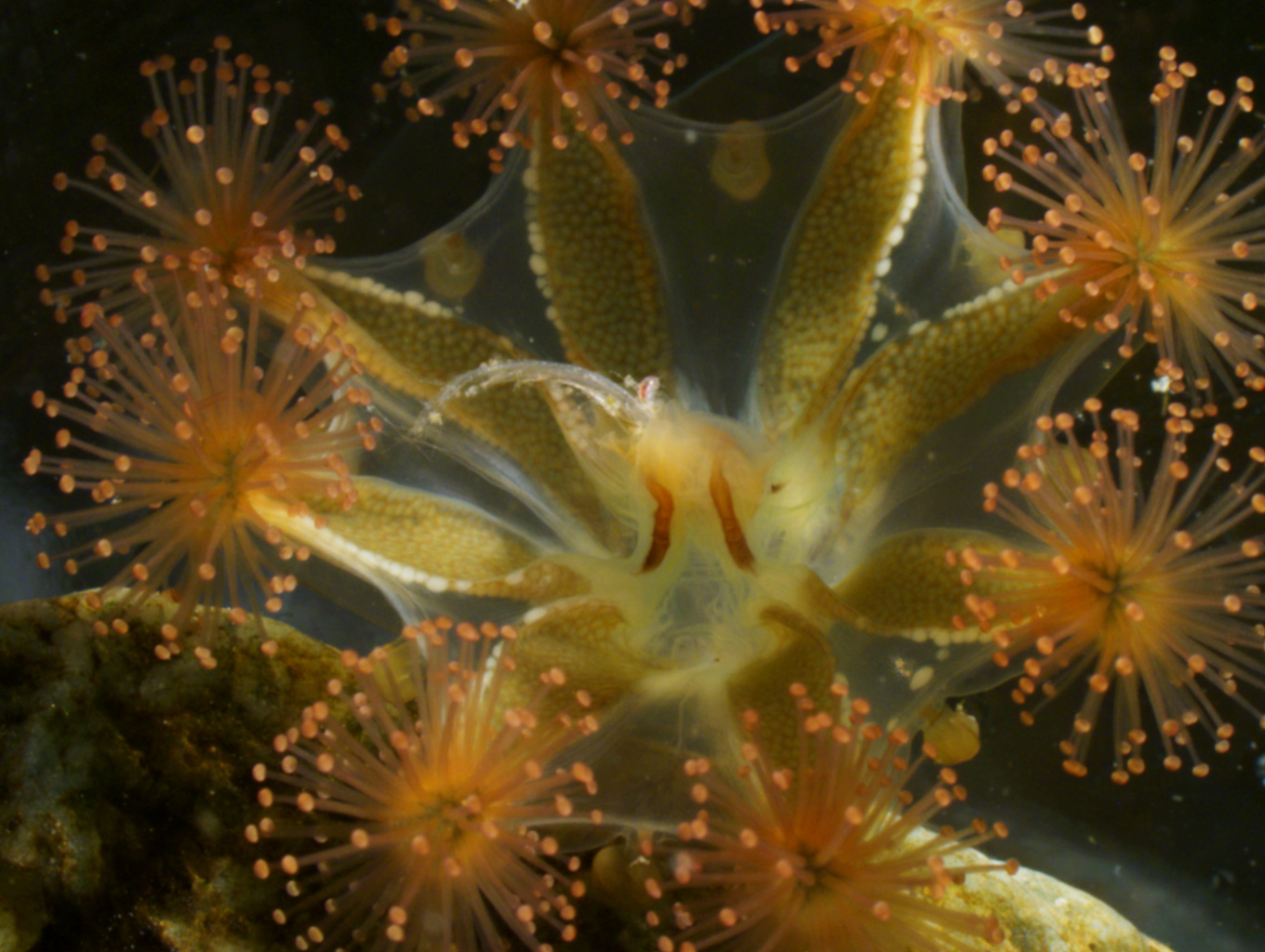
Green-orange

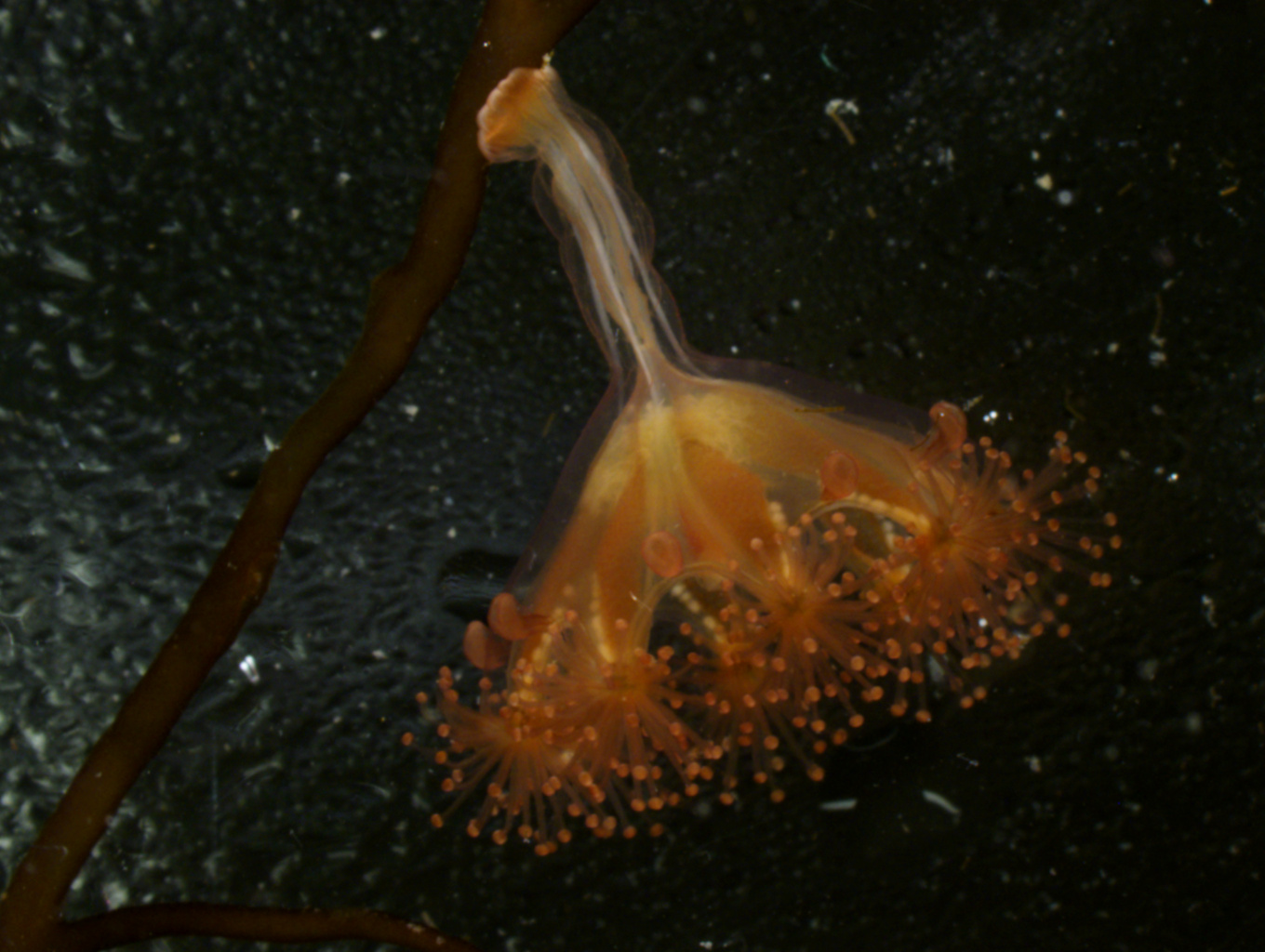
Orange

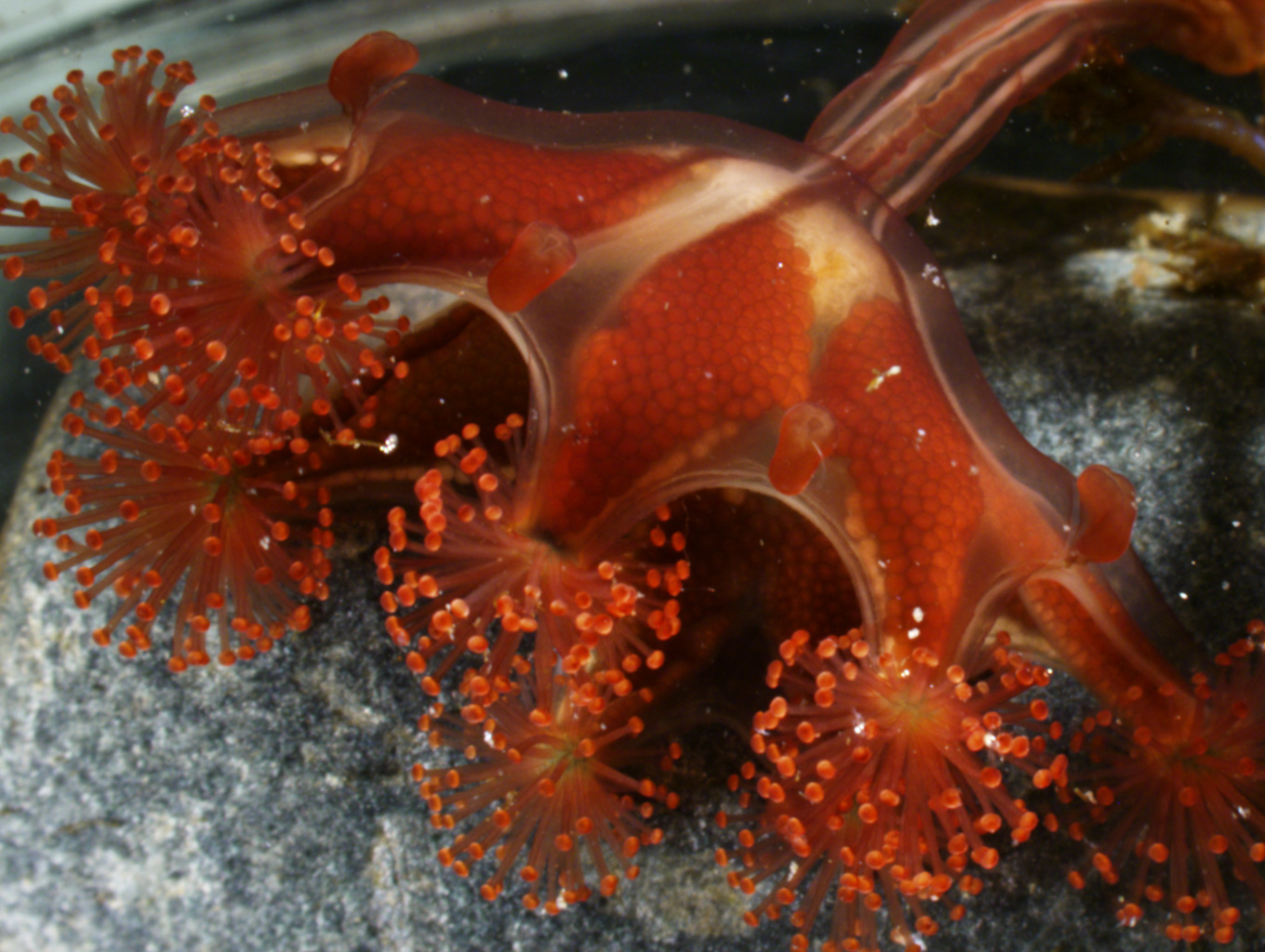
Red

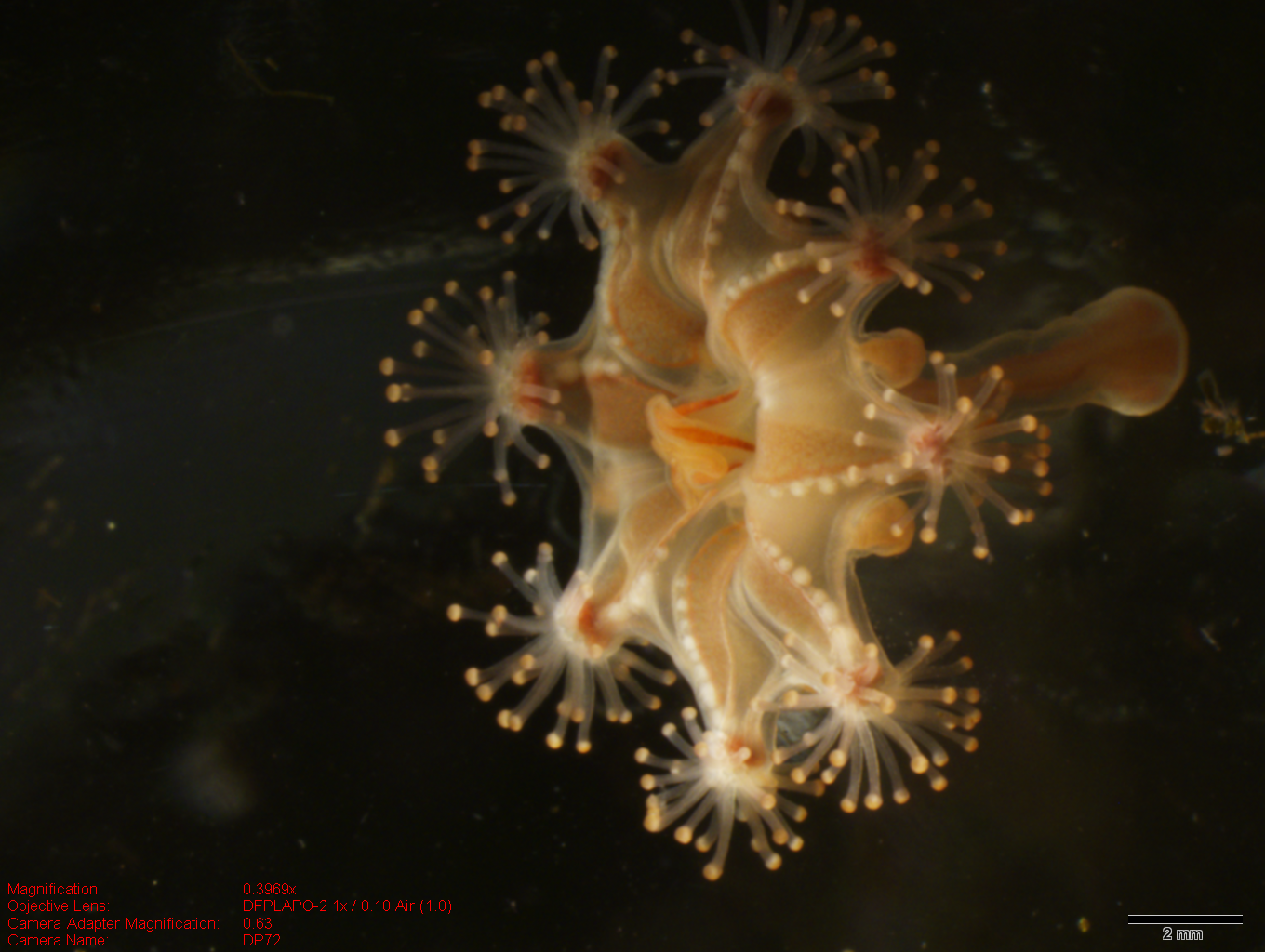
Juvenile H. sanjuanensis with peach colouring

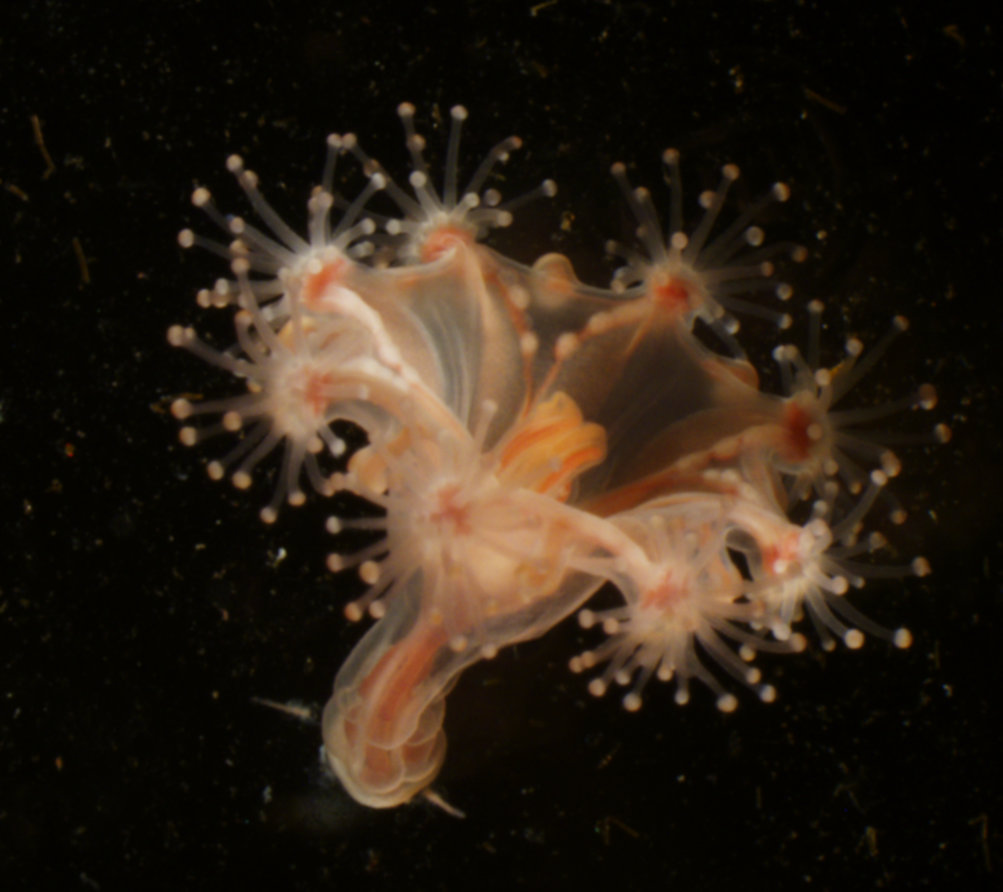
Juvenile H. sanjuanensis with peach colouring
