= Calyx (anatomy) =

Cuplike areas or structures on animals

In animal anatomy, a calyx (pl. calyces or calyxes; also calix; pl. calices or calixes) is a cuplike area or structure.

== Etymology ==
Latin, from calyx (from Ancient Greek κάλυξ, 'case of a bud, husk').

== Cnidarians ==
The spicules containing the basal portion of the upper tentacular part of the polyp of some soft corals (also called calice).

== Entoprocta ==
A body part of the Entoprocta from which tentacles arise and the mouth and anus are located.

== Echinoderms ==
The body disk that is covered with a leathery tegumen containing calcareous plates (in crinoids and ophiuroids the main part of the body where the viscera are located).

== Humans ==
Either a minor calyx in the kidney, a conglomeration of two or three minor calyces to form a major calyx, or the Calyx of Held, a particularly large synapse in the mammalian auditory central nervous system, named by H. Held in his 1893 article Die centrale Gehörleitung, due to its flower-petal-like shape.

== Insects ==
In male insects, a funnel-shaped expansion of the basal part of the vas deferens (part of the seminal duct). Also in entomology, a flattened cap of neuropile in an insect brain (a component of the corpus pedunculatum) and by certain female insects, an expansion of the oviduct into which the ovarioles open.

== See also ==
- Calyx (botany)
