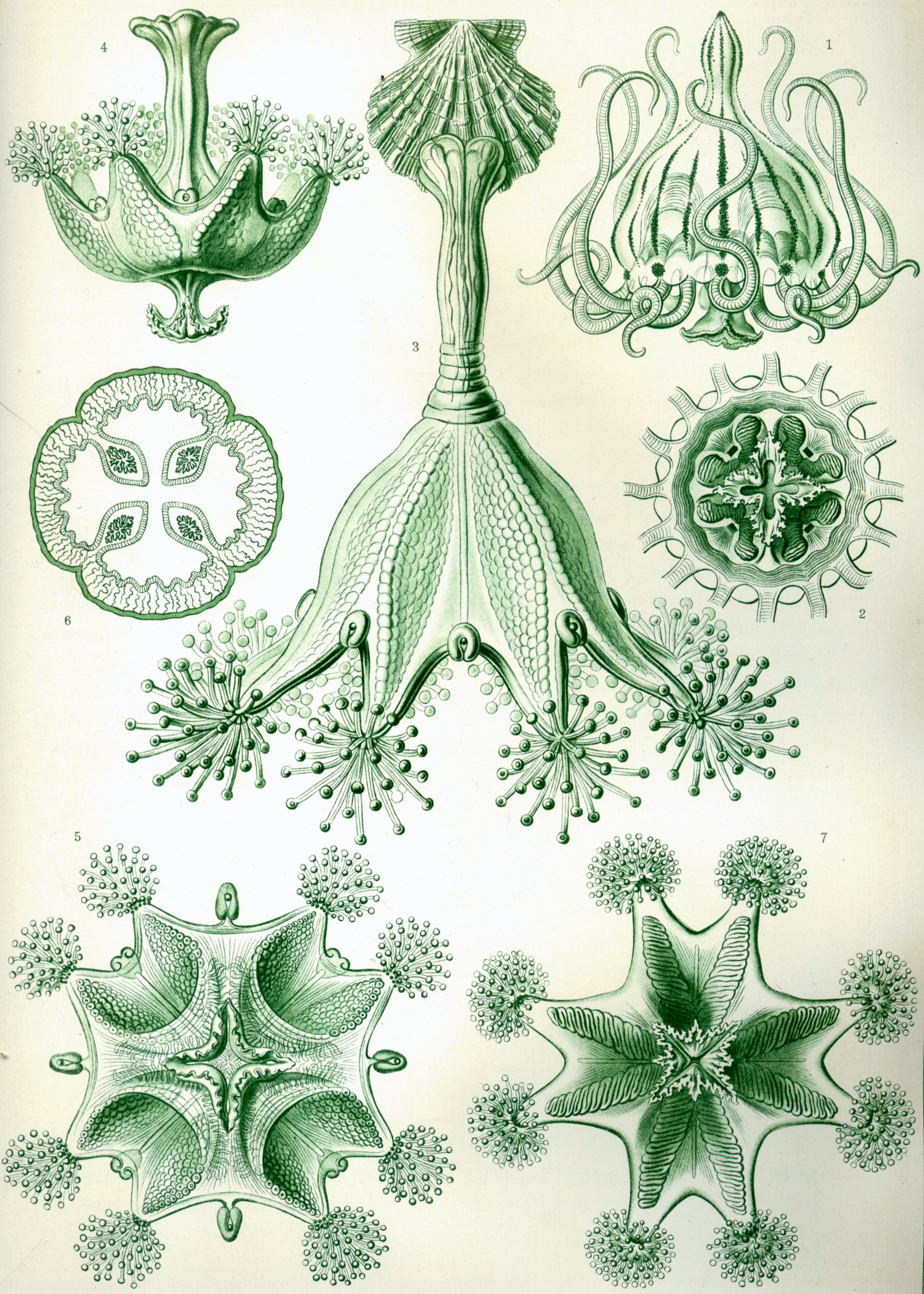
- Stauromedusae from Ernst Haeckel's 1904 Kunstformen der Natur

Scientific classification
- Kingdom: Animalia
- Phylum: Cnidaria
- Class: Staurozoa
- Order: Stauromedusae; Haeckel, 1879

Suborders
- Amyostaurida; Myostaurida

Synonyms
- Cleistocarpida James-Clark, 1863; Cleistocarpidae; Eleutherocarpida James-Clark, 1863; Eleutherocarpidae

= Stauromedusae =

Stalked jellyfishes Temporal range: Latest Precambrian—Recent

Order of jellyfishes

Stauromedusae are the stalked jellyfishes. They are the sole living members of the class Staurozoa and belong to the Medusozoa subphylum of Cnidaria. They are unique among medusa jellyfish in that they do not have an alternation of polyp and medusa life cycle phases, but are instead interpreted as an attached medusa stage, with a lifestyle more resembling that of polypoid forms. They have a generally trumpet-shaped body, oriented upside-down in comparison with other jellyfish, with the tentacles projecting upwards, and the stalk located in the centre of the umbrella. Stauromedusae usually have eight marginal arms at the top of the calyx. They reach their adult sizes within several weeks, typically 1 to 4 centimeters in length.

Members of this class are commonly found in relatively cold waters, close to the shoreline. However, there are a few known species that inhabit tropical and subtropical waters as referenced in the Stauromedusae article by Claudia E. Mills and Yayoi M. Hirano. Sexually mature stauromedusae free-spawn eggs or sperm, which fertilize in the sea and form a creeping, unciliated planula larva. The larvae crawl across the sea floor and find a suitable place, attaching themselves typically to rock or algae, where they eventually develop into a new, attached stauromedusa. Unlike most scyphozoan jellyfish that practice strobilation, or the process of dividing themselves into body segments, which become new individuals, nearly all stauromedusae develop directly into the adult form. Its primary source of food is small organisms, such as copepods, chironomid fly larvae, podocopid ostracods, amphipods, etc. The tendency for the amount of prey consumed increases with the size of the medusae.

== Gallery ==
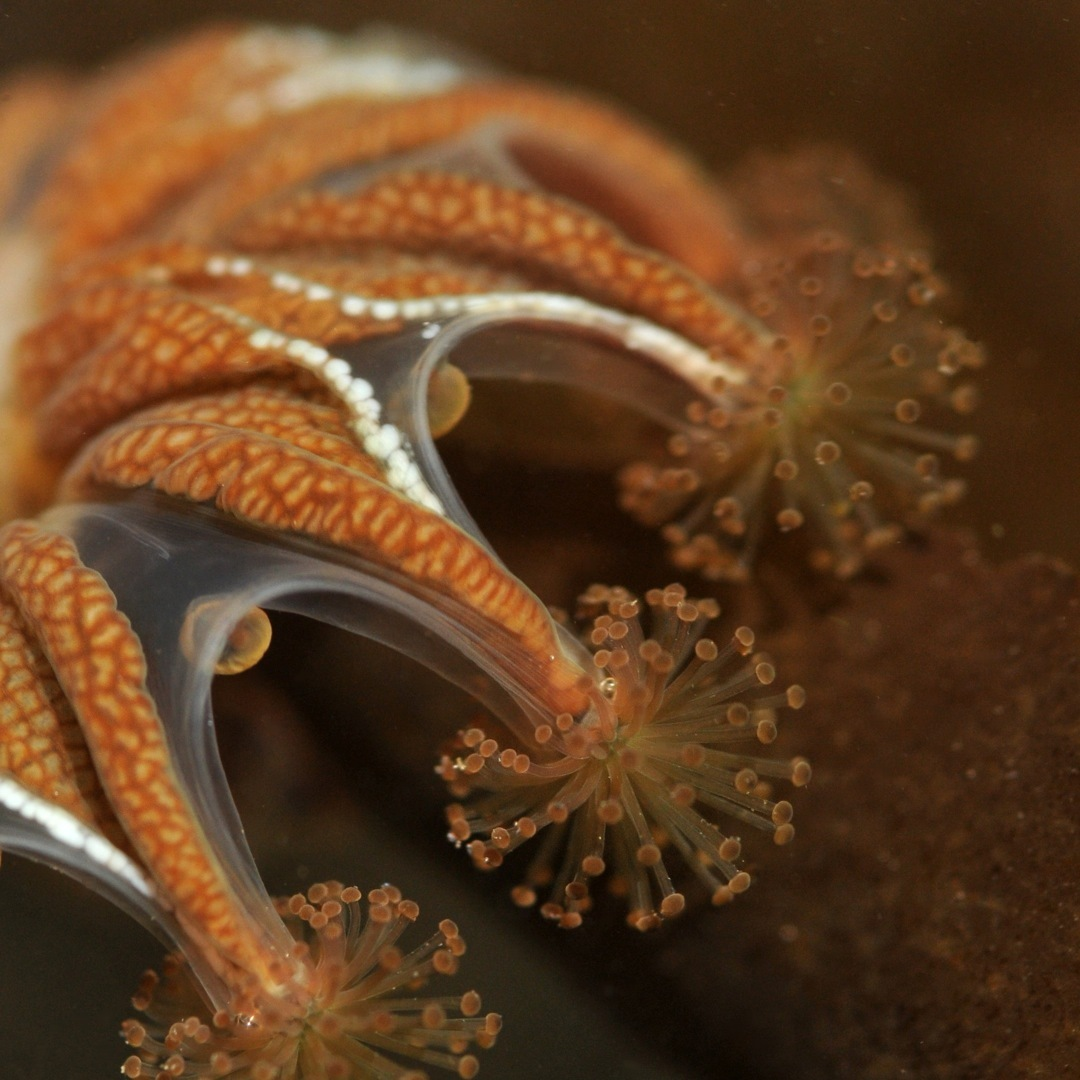
Haliclystus sp.

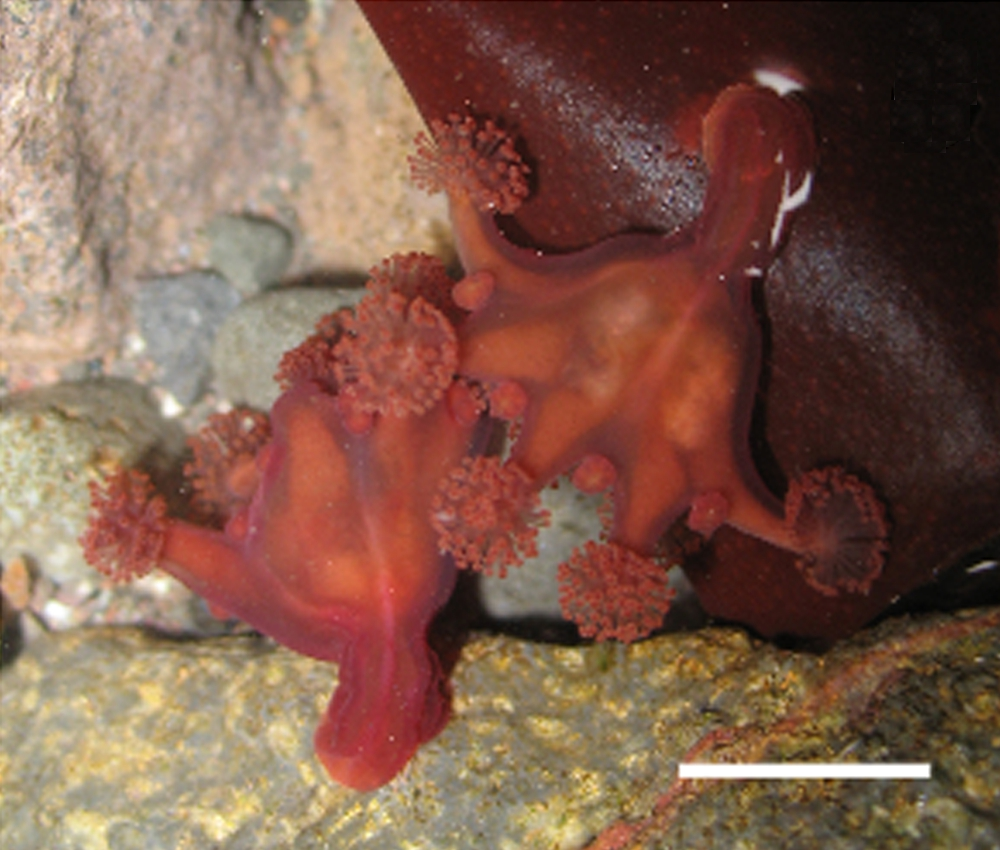
Haliclystus antarcticus

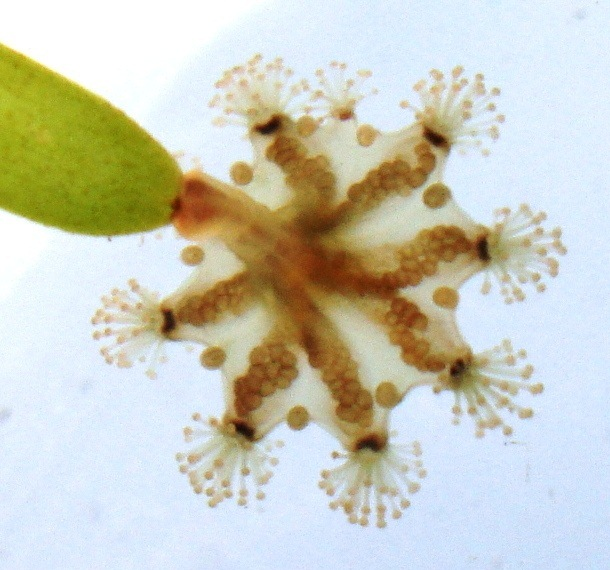
Haliclystus octoradiatus

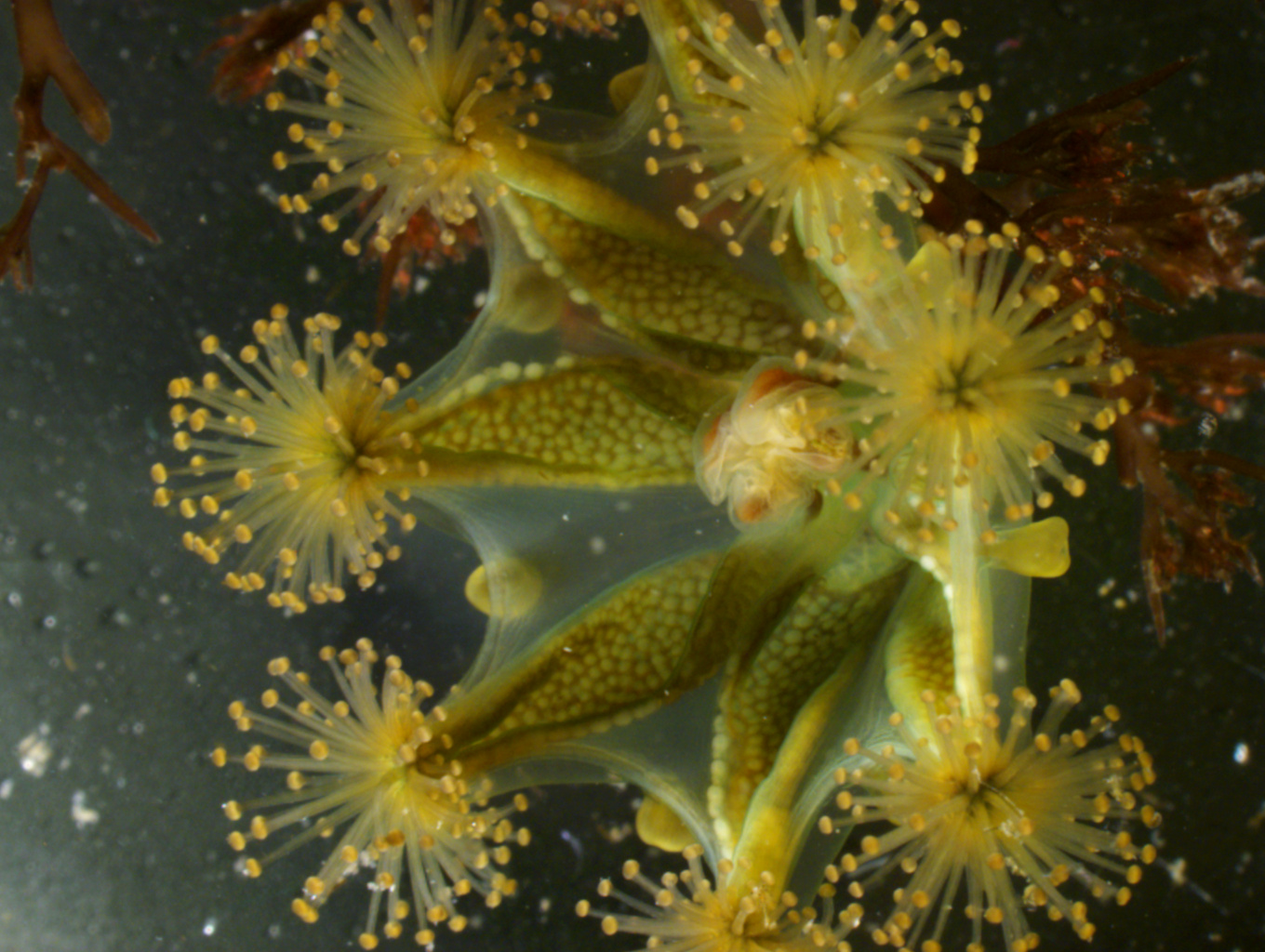
Haliclystus sanjuanensis

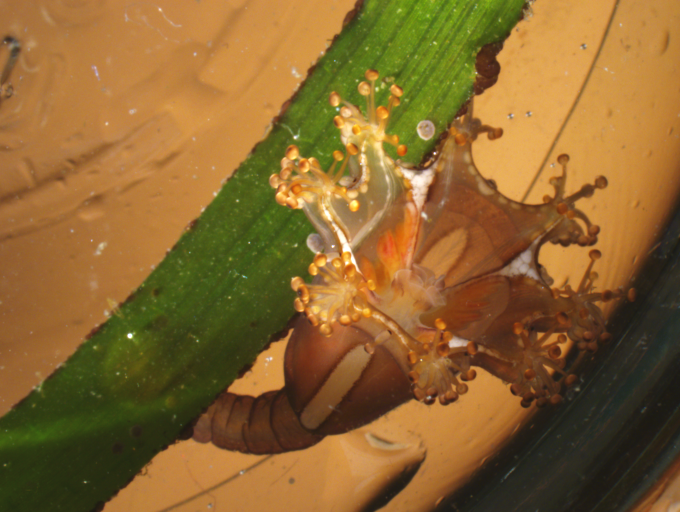
Manania handi

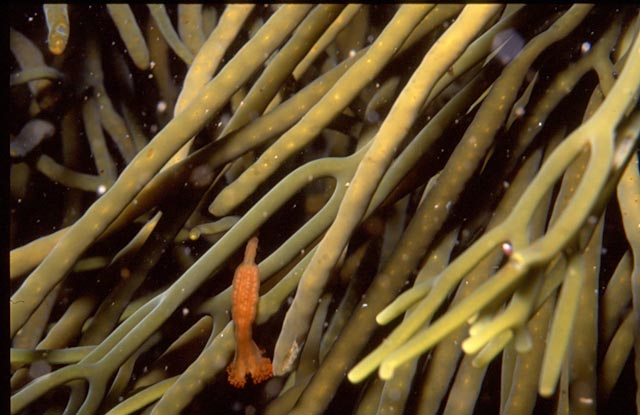
Depastromorpha africana

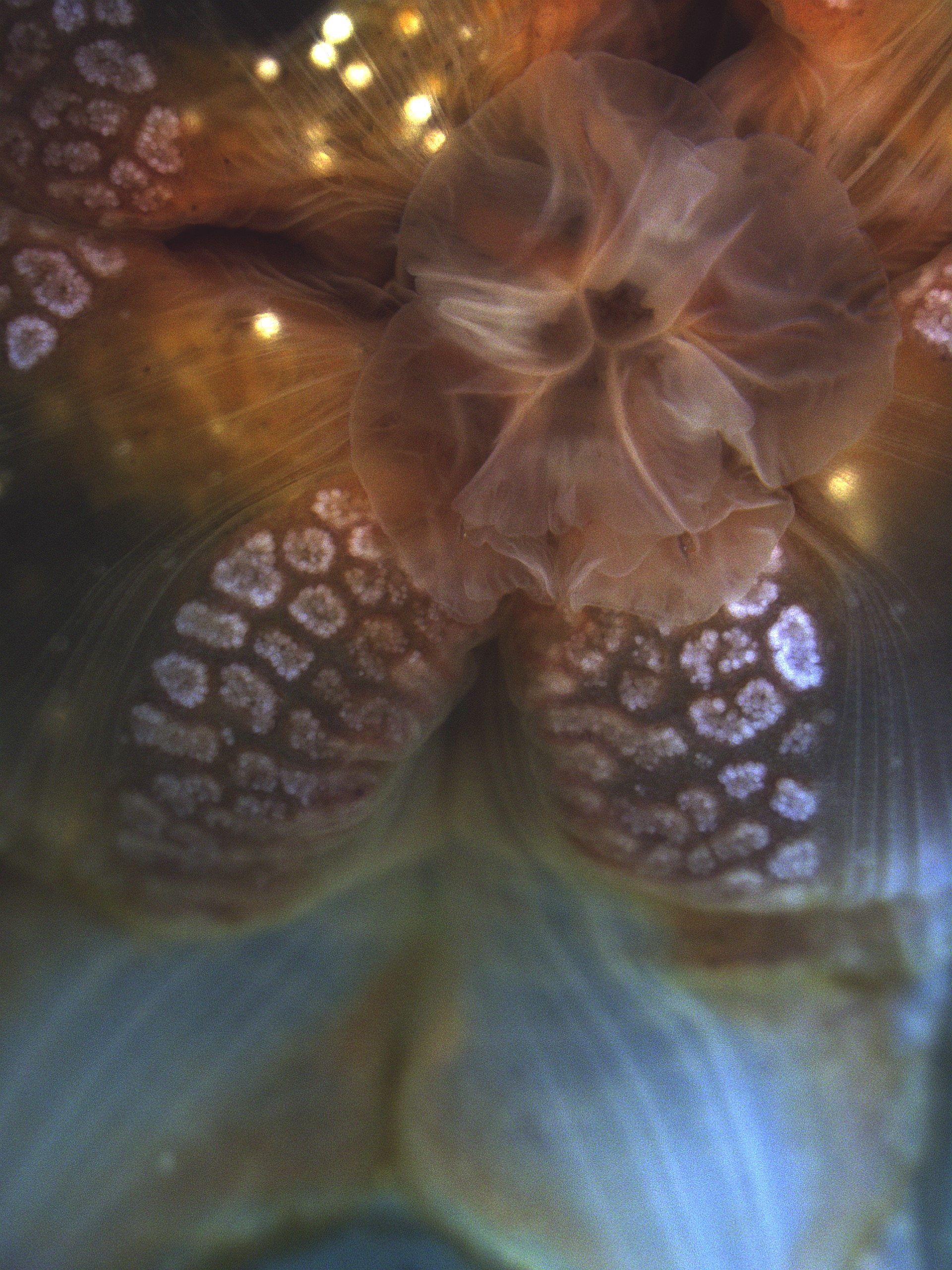
Lucernaria quadricornis

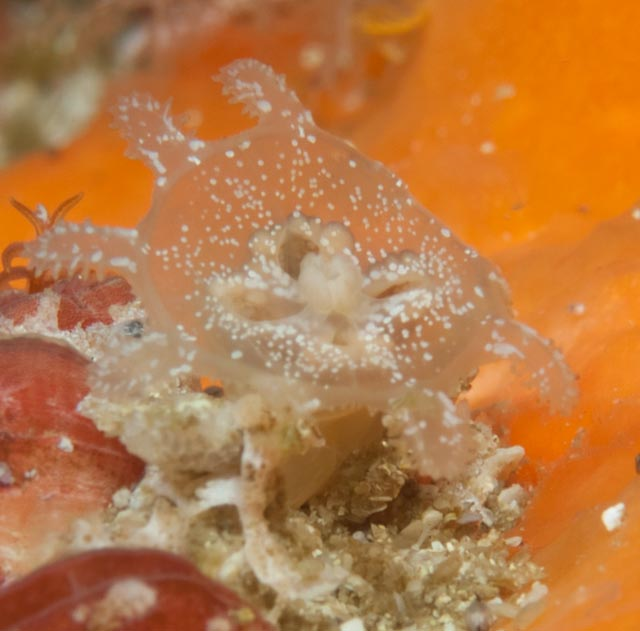
Lipkea spp.
