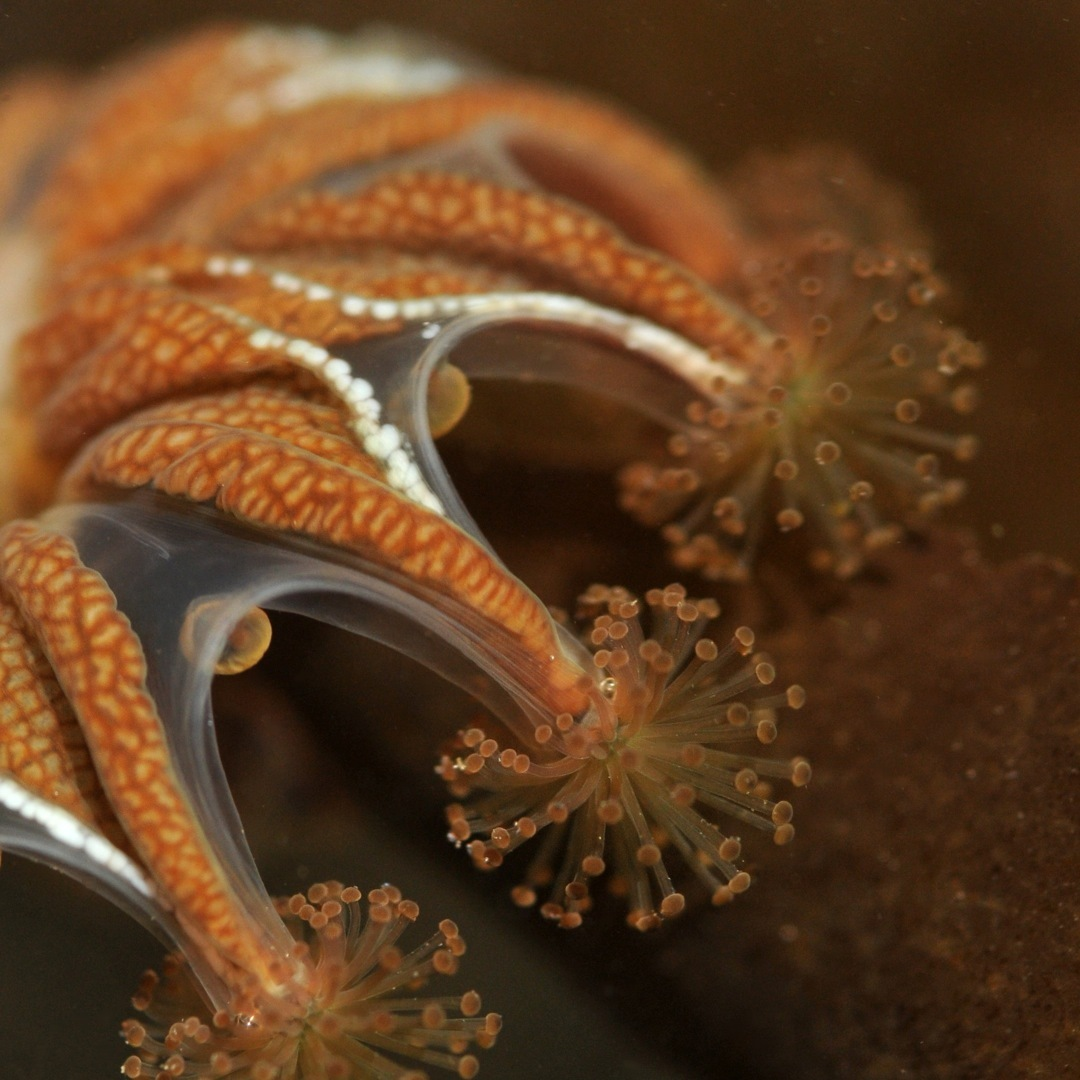
- Haliclystus stejnegeri

Scientific classification
- Kingdom: Animalia
- Phylum: Cnidaria
- Subphylum: Medusozoa
- Class: Staurozoa; Marques & Collins, 2004

Orders
- †Conulatae?; Stauromedusae; †Haootia (not placed in an order); †Mamsetia (not placed in an order)

= Staurozoa =

Staurozoa Temporal range: Late Ediacaran—Recent

Class of jellyfishes

Staurozoa is a class of Medusozoa (or jellyfish). It has one extant order: Stauromedusae (stalked jellyfishes) with a total of 50 known species. A fossil group called Conulariida has been proposed as a second order, although this is highly speculative. This extinct order is largely unknown and described as a possibly cnidarian clade of marine life with shell-like structures. Staurozoans are small animals (1–4 cm or 0.4–1.6 in) that live in marine environments, usually attached to seaweeds, rocks, or gravel. They have a large antitropical distribution, a majority found in boreal or polar, near-shore, and shallow waters. Few staurozoans are found in warmer tropical and subtropical water environments of the Atlantic, Indian, and Pacific Ocean basins, but most are known from the Northern Hemisphere. Over the years the number of discovered species has increased, with an estimated 50 species currently recognized. Information on Staurozoa is sparse, and it is one of the least studied groups within Cnidaria.

== Morphology ==
Their life cycle is not well known, but is likely simplistic. They have a lifespan of less than a year and the planula larva attaches to the substrate, developing into a primary (interstitial) polyp that undergoes an apical transformation to develop into its adult body. The bodies consist of a calyx or cup, where they take in their prey with tentacles that contain cnidocysts (stinging cells). The tentacles are clusters on the edge of the body that lie on a stalk that attaches to a benthic substrate with their adhesive basal disk. At the base of each cluster of tentacles, depending on the species of Staurozoa, there will be either intertentacular lobules or a "U-shaped" space. The function of these features is still not fully known, but it is hypothesized that they could assist with communication between secondary tentacles. Their epidermis is thickened at the tips of their outermost tentacles to form hollow adhesive pads called anchors, which are thought to help with making small movements and attaching to its substrate. The color of a staurozoan depends on where they have attached in their environment.

Their musculature is composed of circular and longitudinal muscles, and it has been suggested that this structuring could have played an important role in the evolution of Staurozoa, as the most recent common ancestor of staurozoans possessed peduncular muscles that have since been lost. It has also been found that Staurozoa possess specialized structures called gametoducts, which allow them to control when they release their gametes to better protect their gonads.

== Ecology ==
Staurozoans are predators. Their diet includes crustaceans, with smaller staurozoans consuming harpacticoid copepods and larger species consuming gammarid amphipods. They also eat chironomid fly larvae and plankton. After digestion, they eject the remains of their food from their bodies. They are also preyed upon by fish as well as mollusks.

It has been posited that staurozoans can experience blooms like several other species in Medusozoa, however the legitimacy of this bloom can be called into question depending on the debated definition of blooms, as the larger numbers of Staurozoa do not cause any harm to the surrounding environment, and do not have any significant ecological impact like a typical jellyfish bloom would.

== Gallery ==
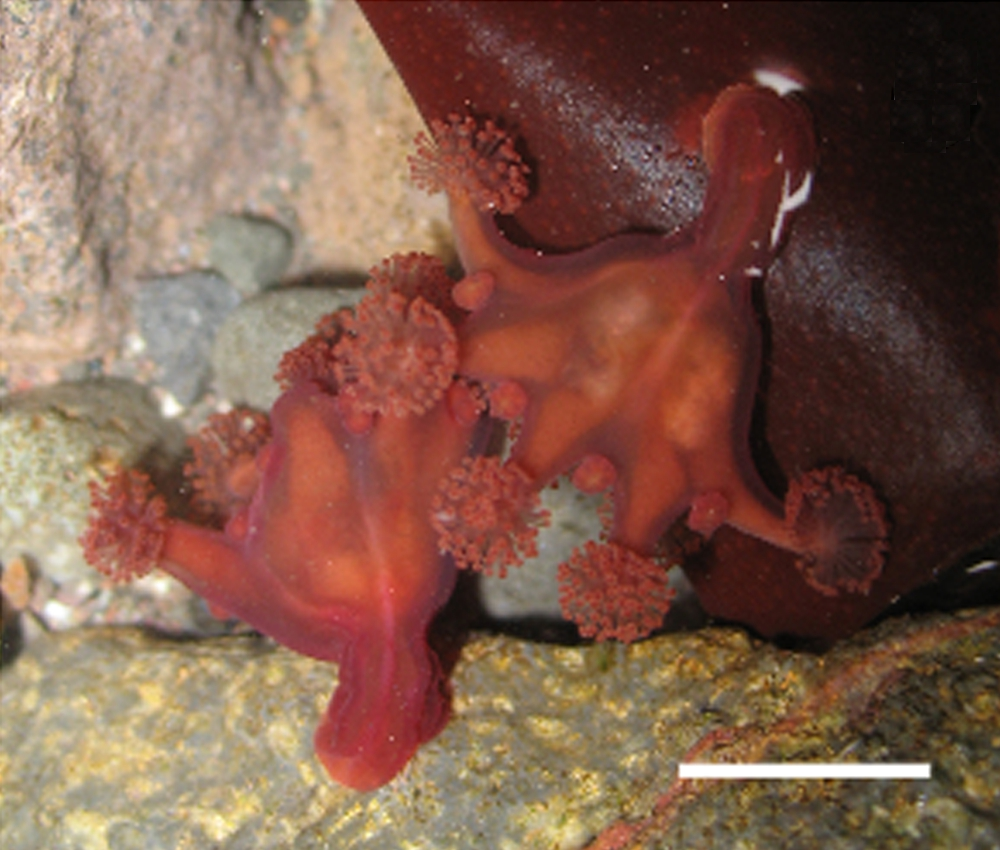
Haliclystus antarcticus

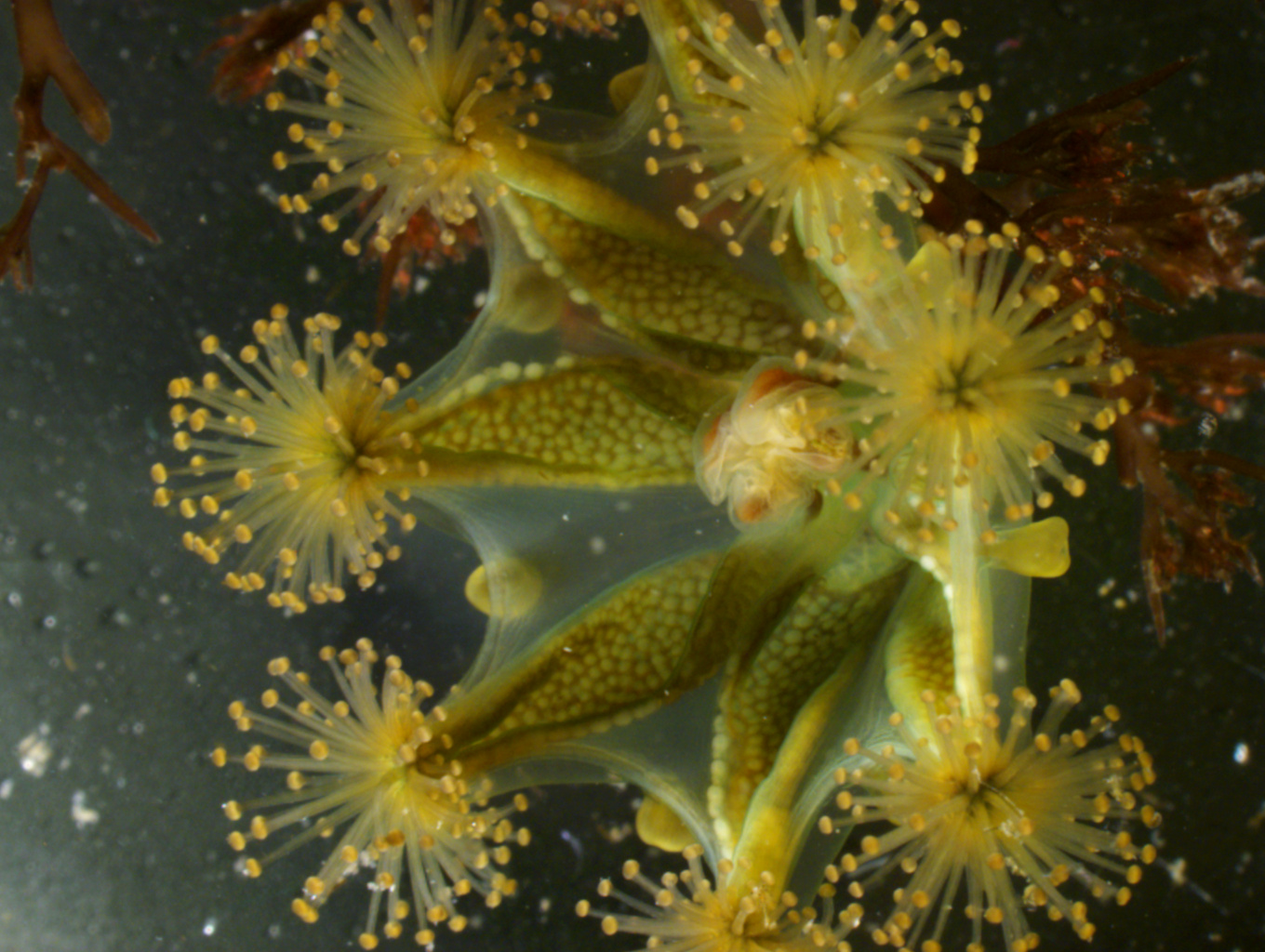
Haliclystus sanjuanensis

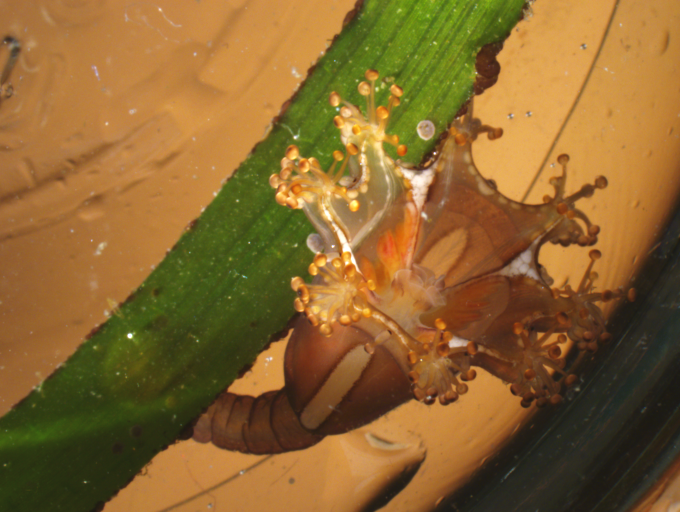
Manania handi
