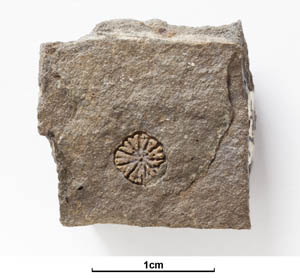
- Kilbuchophyllia. discoidea paratype

Scientific classification
- Kingdom: Animalia
- Phylum: Cnidaria
- Subphylum: Anthozoa
- Class: Hexacorallia
- Order: †Kilbuchophyllida; Scrutton & Clarkson, 1991
- Family: †Kilbuchophyllidae; Scrutton & Clarkson, 1991
- Genus: †Kilbuchophyllia; Scrutton & Clarkson, 1991

Type species
- †Kilbuchophyllia discoidea Scrutton & Clarkson, 1991

Other species
- †K. clarksoni Scrutton, 1994

Synonyms
- Kilbuchophyllum Scrutton & Clarkson, 1991 [sic] (Note: The first mentioning of the genus name by Scrutton & Clarkson (1991) had it incorrectly listed as Kilbuchophyllum instead of Kilbuchophyllia.)

= Kilbuchophyllia =

Kilbuchophyllia Temporal range: Late Ordovician, ~458.2–453 Ma

Extinct genus of corals

Kilbuchophyllia is an extinct genus of hexacoral belonging to the monotypic order Kilbuchophyllida and family Kilbuchophyllidae. It is known from the Late Ordovician Kirkcolm Formation of Scotland and the Bardahessiagh Formation of Northern Ireland, and the species K. discoidea and K. clarksoni are known.

== Discovery and naming ==
Ben Peach and John Horne were the first to describe material belonging to Kilbuchophyllia. They discovered material belonging to the genus during their 1899 survey of the Ordovician rocks of Scotland and described the specimens from Kilbucho as "shelly fossils".

=== Kilbuchophyllia discoidea ===
Twenty specimens (including the holotype RMS 1989.36.1) were found within the poorly-studied greywackes of Wallace's Cast, Kilbucho during the 1980s which were used as the basis of naming Kilbuchophylla discoidea by Scrutton & Clarkson (1991), and even more material was described by Scrutton in 1993 and 1996. This extended the known range to Wallace's Cast, Glenkip Burn, Snar Water, and Duntercleuch.

In the past, the paratype of K. discoidea was listed as belonging to Palaecyclus.

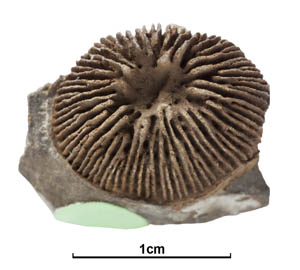
K. clarksoni holotype

=== Kilbuchophyllia clarksoni ===
Kilbuchophyllia clarksoni was named by Scrutton (1993) and the holotype of K. clarksoni is GSE9935. A specimen of K. clarksoni was found at Kilbucho in August 1995 and was the first of many occurrences of the species at Kilbucho.

In 1992, excavations at the Bardahessiagh Formation in County Tyrone, Northern Ireland uncovered specimens of K. clarksoni which were described by Scrutton, Jeram & Armstrong (1997).

== Description ==
Kilbuchophyllia had radially organised septae with a beaded appearance and six-fold cyclic insertion, and it likely attempted to mineralise by forming calcite around a soft body. It had weak bilateral symmetry and was a solitary animal as it did not associate with rugose corals.

== Classification ==
The organisation of its septae prompted Scrutton & Clarkson (1991) to place Kilbuchophyllia into Zoantharia by creating the order Kilbuchophyllida and the family Kilbuchophyllidae as a branch of Corallimorpharia. (Note: It is sometimes incorrectly stated that Scrutton & Clarkson placed Kilbuchophyllia into Scleractinia when instead they described it as being homeomorphic to Scleractinia.) It was later moved into Hexacorallia by Scrutton (1997) and is no longer seen as belonging to Scleractinia. Sepkoski (2002) agreed with the placement of Kilbuchophyllia into Zoantharia.

The genus has implications for showing signs of morphological convergence with Scleractinia.

== Paleogeography and extinction ==
Kilbuchophyllia is known from the Late Ordovician Kirkcolm Formation (Scotland) and the Bardahessiagh Formation (Northern Ireland). They were deposited in environments which allowed for Kilbuchophyllia to grow near volcanic islands.

It is believed that a submarine landslide caused the extinction of the K. discoidea population at Kilbucho. The K. clarksoni population at Craigbardahessiagh was extinct before the Late Ordovician mass extinction.
