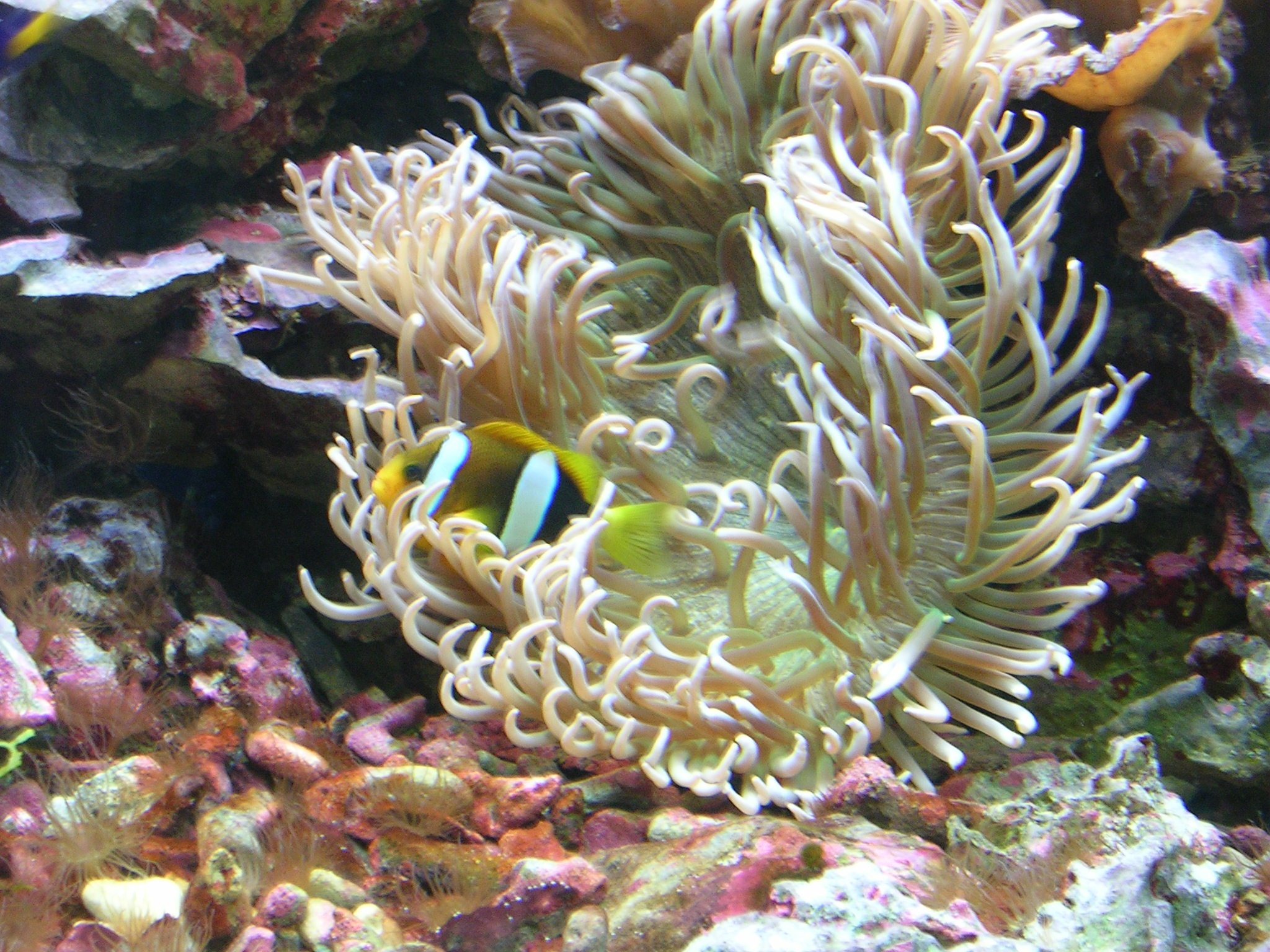
- Macrodactyla doreensis

Scientific classification
- Domain: Eukaryota
- Kingdom: Animalia
- Phylum: Cnidaria
- Subphylum: Anthozoa
- Class: Hexacorallia
- Order: Actiniaria
- Family: Actiniidae
- Genus: Macrodactyla; Haddon, 1898

= Macrodactyla =

Genus of sea anemone

Macrodactyla is a genus of sea anemone in the family Actiniidae. Species of Macrodactyla are typically found in waters near Asia and Australia.

== Species ==
At least three species of Macrodactyla have been described:

- Macrodactyla aspera
- Macrodactyla doreensis
- Macrodactyla fautinae

It has been proposed in 2023 for M. doreensis to be transferred to the genus, Heteractis.
