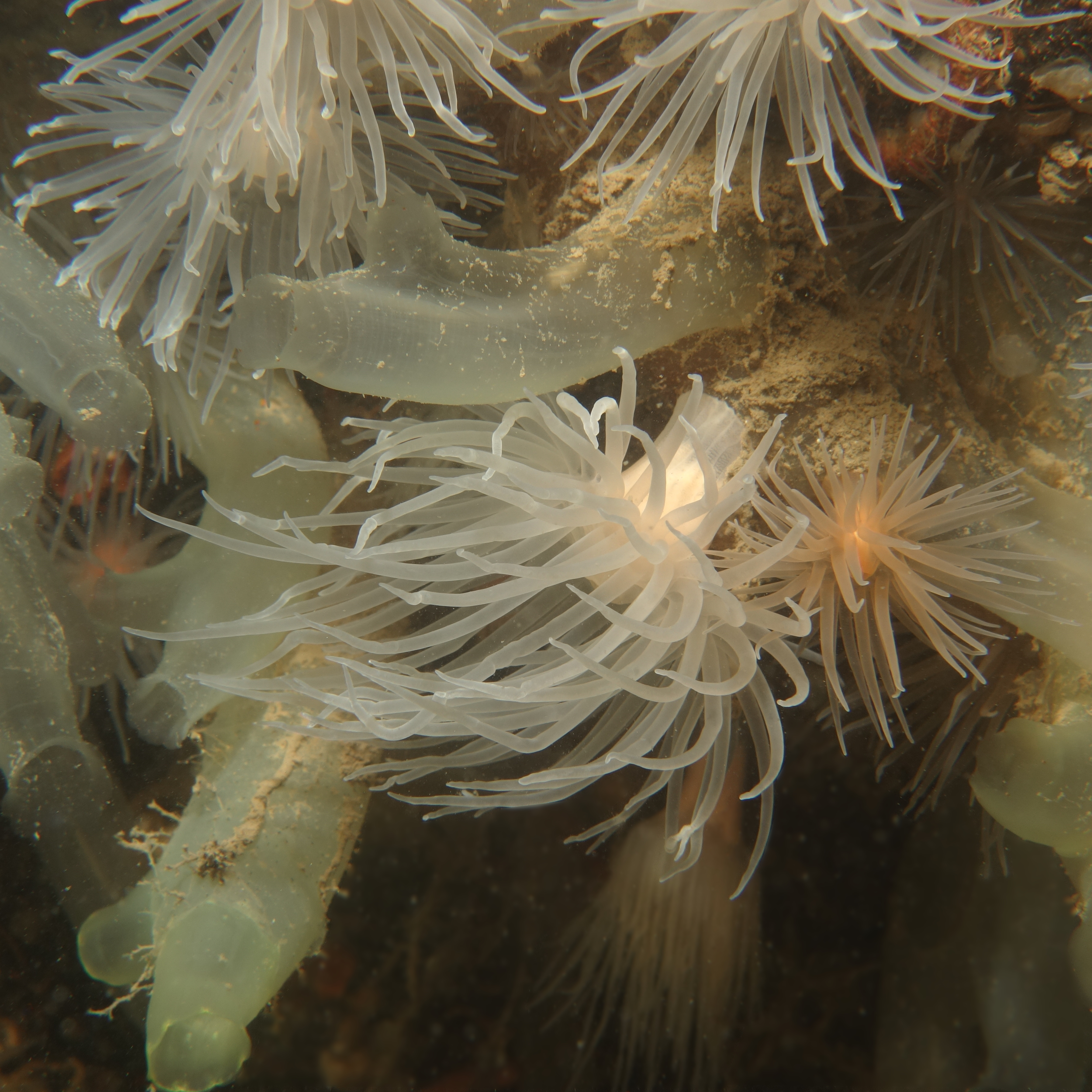
- Sea loch anemone

Scientific classification
- Kingdom: Animalia
- Phylum: Cnidaria
- Subphylum: Anthozoa
- Class: Hexacorallia
- Order: Actiniaria
- Family: Gonactiniidae
- Genus: Protanthea; Carlgren, 1891
- Species: P. simplex

Binomial name
- Protanthea simplex Carlgren, 1891

Synonyms
- (Genus): Prothantea; (Species): Prothantea simplex Zamponi, 1998

= Protanthea =

Genus of sea anemones

Protanthea simplex is a species of sea anemone found in deep water off the coasts of north west Europe. It is the only species in the monotypic genus Protanthea.

== Description ==
P. simplex is a delicate sea anemone. The tentacles are non-retractable and have a frosty appearance and are usually held outstretched. The column is salmon pink, flared below the tentacles and reaches lengths of up to two centimetres. It has a flattened, lightly adherent base bulging out below the pedal disc. There are up to 200 slender, translucent, white or pale pink tentacles up to one and a half centimetres long arranged in five rings. When the orangeish-pink gonads are ripe, they may be visible through the wall of the column.

== Distribution ==
This species is found in both shallow and deep water around the western coast of Scotland from the Firth of Clyde northward, particularly in sea lochs. It is also found round the coasts of the Skagerrak and northern Kattegat and in one location in Connemara, Galway, Ireland. It seems to prefer vertical rock faces in sheltered sites with little movement of water and has been found as deep as five hundred metres.

== Biology ==
This species is a passive suspension feeder. It is often solitary but it has been recorded at densities of up to two thousand per square metre. It shows an unusual behaviour when occasionally it loses muscle tone and hangs limply from its pedal disc attachment. At other times it is very active, exhibiting a violent thrashing of the tentacles in response to external stimuli.

Reproduction can be by sexual or asexual means. In sexual reproduction, eggs and sperm are ejected through the mouth and liberated into the sea. The fertilised egg develops into a planula, which settles after fifteen to twenty days and grows into a new individual. In asexual reproduction, fragments of the column are capable of regenerating into new individuals.
