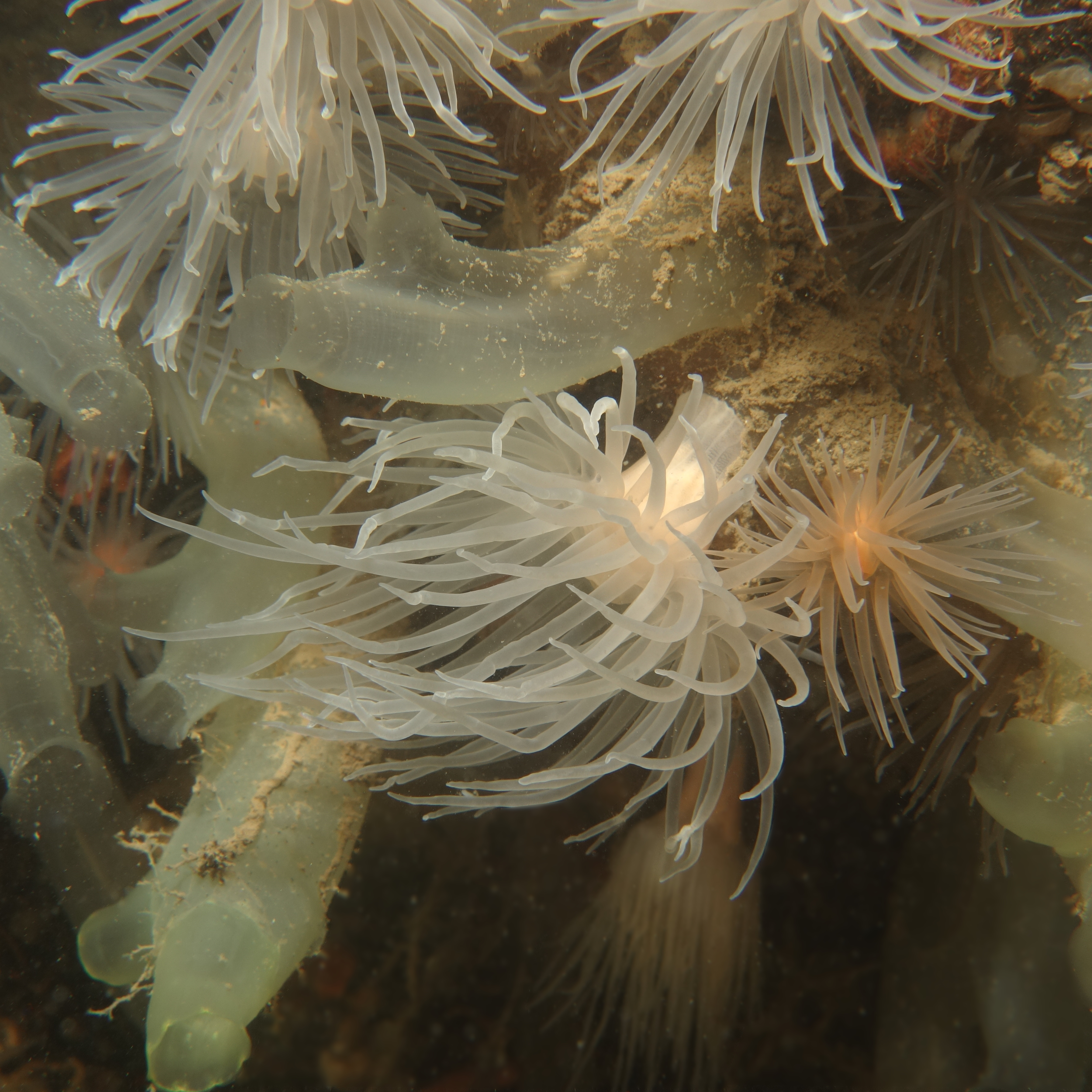
- Protanthea simplex, Sound of Mull, Scotland

Scientific classification
- Kingdom: Animalia
- Phylum: Cnidaria
- Subphylum: Anthozoa
- Class: Hexacorallia
- Order: Actiniaria
- Superfamily: Metridioidea
- Family: Gonactiniidae; Carlgren, 1893

Synonyms
- Protantheae

= Gonactiniidae =

Family of corals

Gonactiniidae is a family of anthozoans in the order Actinaria.

== Genera ==
- Gonactinia Sars, 1851
- Protanthea Carlgren, 1891
