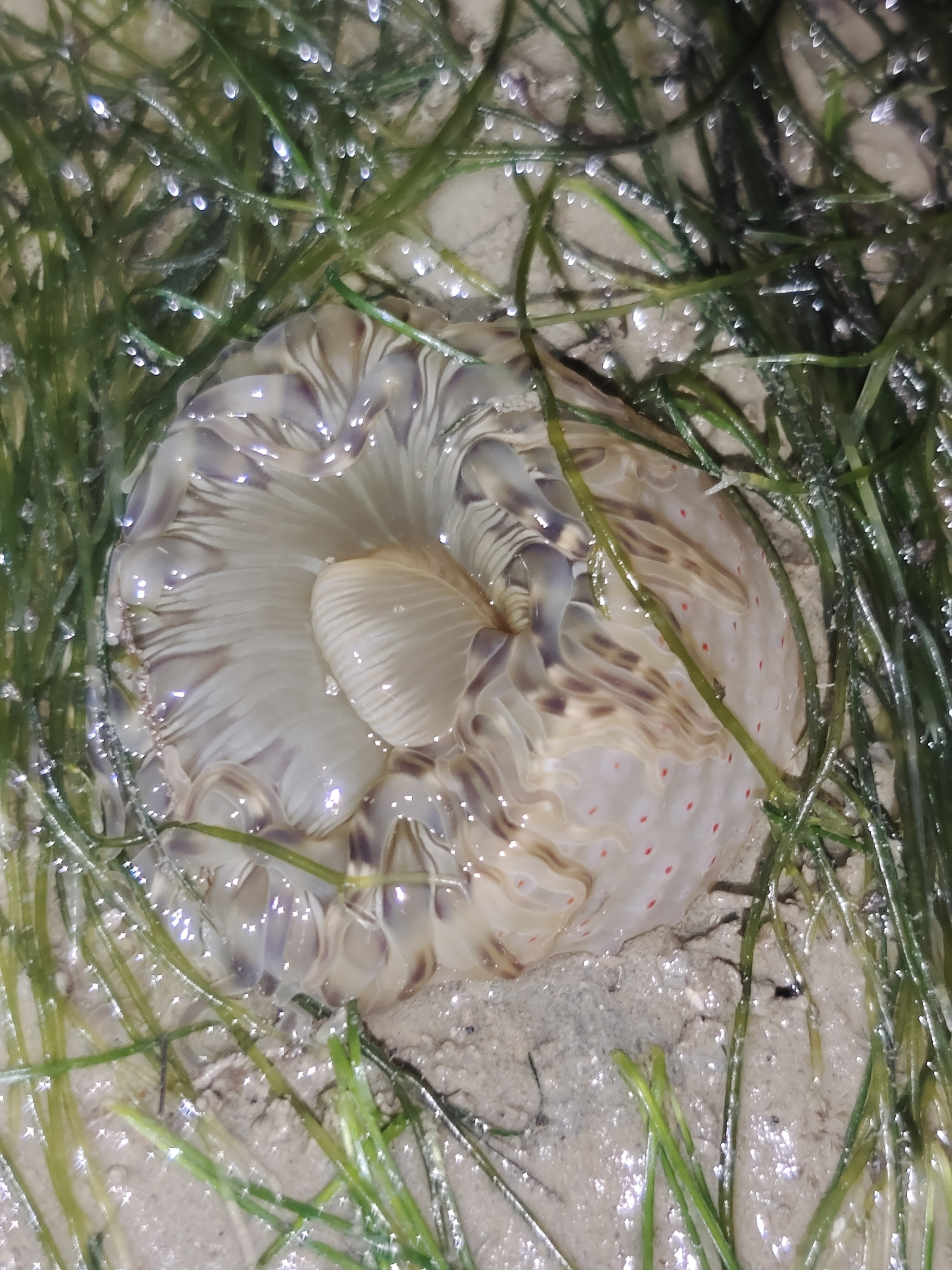

Scientific classification
- Domain: Eukaryota
- Kingdom: Animalia
- Phylum: Cnidaria
- Subphylum: Anthozoa
- Class: Hexacorallia
- Order: Actiniaria
- Family: Actiniidae
- Genus: Macrodactyla
- Species: M. fautinae

Binomial name
- Macrodactyla fautinae Yap, Mitchell, Quek & Huang, 2023

= Tiger anemone =

Species of sea anemone

The tiger anemone (Macrodactyla fautinae) is a species of sea anemone native to marine habitats near Singapore. Previously sighted before it was first described as a new species in 2023, M. fautinae has also been commonly referred to as the purple-lip sand anemone by local residents. The species is named in honor of Daphne Gail Fautin, who was an American zoologist and professor at the University of Kansas.

== Distribution ==
The tiger anemone is found in coastal waters of the Straits of Johor near Singapore, in particularly Changi where it is a relatively common sight. The species has not been sighted anywhere else.

== Description ==
The tiger anemone is defined by a cylindrical body with 96 tentacles, that have been described to be smooth and possessing a striped brown-white pattern. These tentacles are arranged in five cycles. The body itself is cream-colored, with pink structures that are capable of expelling water when the anemone contracts.

The tiger anemone has shown to be able to swallow prey whole that are larger than itself. It also possesses the ability to turn its throat inside-out, which has been theorized to be a method used to catch prey. This behavior has also been observed at low tides, in which the throats are used to hide the body. Stinging structures are present on the throat when it is turned inside-out. While the tiger anemone possesses stingers, the effect of them on humans is still unknown.

When the tiger anemone is disturbed, it is known to not retract completely, with the tips of tentacles still exposed. The tentacles reach a length of 60-100 mm when expanded. The diameter of the oral disc reaches up to 80 mm. Oral discs may possess cross band patterns that appear to be shaped like the letters "V" or "W". This helps distinguish M. fautinae from another species of Macrodactyla, Macrodactyla aspera, in addition to the different textures of their tentacles.
