= Anthopleura stellula =

Scientific classification
- Kingdom: Animalia
- Phylum: Cnidaria
- Subphylum: Anthozoa
- Class: Hexacorallia
- Order: Actiniaria
- Family: Actiniidae
- Genus: Anthopleura
- Species: A. stellula

Binomial name
- Anthopleura stellula (Hemprich & Ehrenberg in Ehrenberg, 1834)

Synonyms
- Actinia stellula Hemprich & Ehrenberg in Ehrenberg, 1834; Anthopleura elatensis England, 1969; Bunodes stellula (Hemprich & Ehrenberg in Ehrenberg, 1834)

Species of sea anemone

Anthopleura stellula is a species of sea anemone in the family Actiniidae. It was first described in 1834 by Wilhelm Hemprich and Christian Gottfried Ehrenberg as Actinia (Isacmaea) stellula. It is found in the Indian Ocean and the Red Sea, and is unusual among sea anemones in that it can divide itself in two transversely.

== Biology ==
Anthopleura stellula is unusual among sea anemones in that it can divide by transverse fission. This is not a common method of asexual reproduction among these sea anemones but tends to occur as a reaction to stress, such as when an anemone is experiencing a lowering of the salinity. The fission involves the animal forming a transverse constriction before dividing in two, the oral portion growing a new pedal disc and the basal portion growing a new oral disc and pharynx. There are a few other sea anemones such as Gonactinia prolifera that can divide in this way, and all are rather small, primitive sea anemones with simple internal structures. Internal reorganisation often starts before the fission process commences. During the fission process, an indentation occurs halfway down the column, new tentacles begin to develop below the constriction, and the two portions separate.

Research has shown that a decrease in salinity encourages fission while an increase prevents it happening. When A. stellula was placed in an aquarium with the gem anemone Aulactinia verrucosa and the salinity was reduced, the fission of A. stellula induced fission in A. verrucosa, even though that species never spontaneously undergoes fission in other circumstances. It is thought that A. stellula produces "fission substances" when the salinity falls, and that these can circulate in the water and affect other sea anemones.
