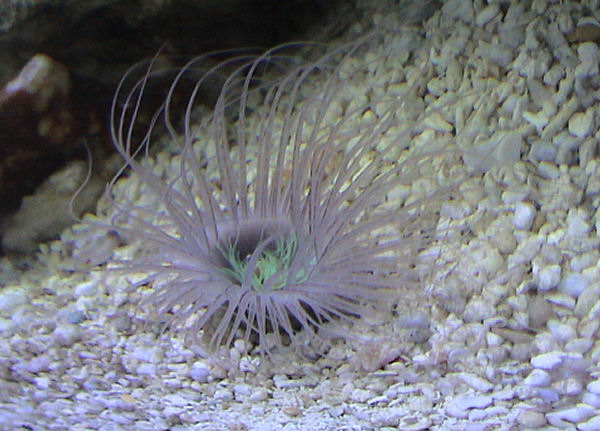
- Cerianthus sp., an example of Ceriantharia.
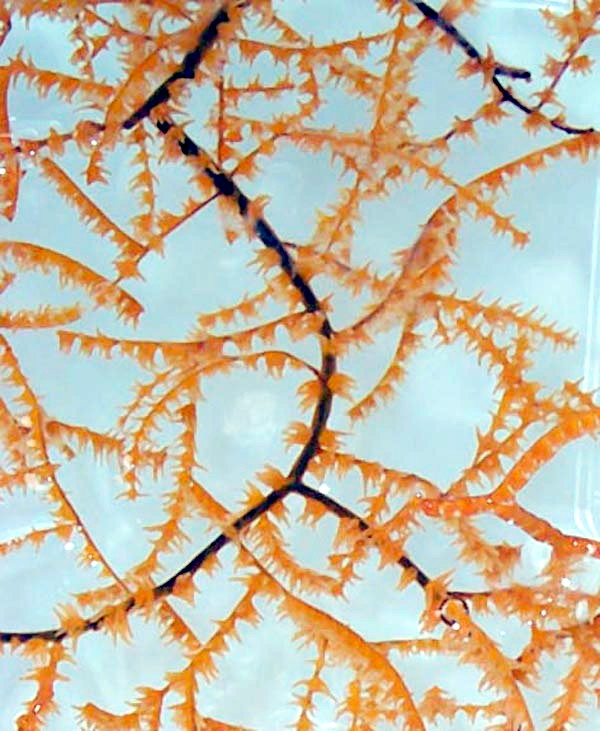
- Black coral colony, an example of Antipatharia

Scientific classification
- Kingdom: Animalia
- Phylum: Cnidaria
- Subphylum: Anthozoa
- Class: Hexacorallia
- Order: Ceriantipatharia; Van Beneden, É., 1898

= Ceriantipatharia =

Former subclass of Anthozoa

Ceriantipatharia (rare synonym: Hexacorallia Goette, 1902 [non Haeckel, 1866]) is a taxon (usually a subclass) of Anthozoans used in some systems. It consists of the two taxa (usually orders) Ceriantharia (tube anemones) and Antipatharia (black corals).

The taxon Ceriantipatharia, comprising Ceriantharia and Antipatharia, has been used in many systems of cnidarianns from 1898 onwards. Rejected by some authors from the very beginning (i. e. since around 1900), it is only since around the year 2000 that the taxon Ceriantipatharia has been deprecated by most texts and the orders Ceriantharia and Antipatharia have been classified as mutually unrelated orders of Hexacorallia, rather than as orders of Ceriantipatharia (see the chapter Classification history for details). Some texts, however, still use Ceriantipatharia even today.

According to a 2001 proposal, the subclass Ceriantipatharia should remain a valid taxon, but it should contain only the order Ceriantharia.

== Classification history ==
=== Rank ===
The taxon Ceriantipatharia was created by Édouard van Beneden in 1898 (see below) without explicitly mentioning what rank Ceriantipatharia has. He only mentions that the rank immediately above Ceriantipatharia is a subclass. Therefore, the texts of the early 20th century (rarely also later texts) interpreted van Beneden's Ceriantipatharia as having the rank of an order.

Since the beginning of the 20th century, however, authors have assigned the same rank to Ceriantipatharia as to hexacorals (Zoantharia sensu lato, aka Hexacorallia) and octocorals (Octocorallia). This means that since then Ceriantipatharia has had either the rank of a subclass or the rank of a class, depending on what the rank of Anthozoa and/or Cnidaria was in the particular system. Specifically, Ceriantipatharia can be classified as a subclass of the class Anthozoa, or as a class of the superclass Anthozoa, or as a class of the subphylum Anthozoa, or as a class of the phylum Cnidaria.

Rare ranks of Ceriantipatharia were suborder or superorder.

=== Texts accepting Ceriantipatharia ===
The taxon Ceriantipatharia was introduced by Édouard van Beneden in 1898 in a text which uses a quite atypical system of Cnidaria. Within that system, Ceriantipatharia, made up of Ceriantharia and Antipatharia, were a taxon of the Anthozoan subclass Scyphactiniaria consisting of the taxa Ceriantipatharia, Scyphomedusa and Rugosa (later authors did not consider these three taxa to be related). Van Beneden held that the similarities in morphology between the larva of the ceriantharians (which he called cerinula, portmanteau of cerianthid and planula) and the antipatharian polyp were the main reason for separating the orders Ceriantharia and Antipatharia from the other Hexacorallia orders, and group them as a distinct taxon Ceriantipatharia.

From van Beneden's 1898 text until around the year 2000 (see the chapter below), Ceriantipatharia remained an important taxon in some systems of Cnidaria, profusely used in the systems of many scientists and studied by them. Examples follow:

In 1902, Alexander Goette, in his textbook Lehrbuch der Zoologie, also classifies ceriantharians and antipatharians together, but instead of calling the corresponding taxon Ceriantipatharia, he calls the taxon Hexacorallia, which has the rank of a suborder, with ceriantharians and antipatharians being families of the suborder. Goette's overall system is atypical: His Hexacorallia is sister to the suborder "Octocorallia", which is composed of what we nowadays call octocorals and hexacorals. The two Goette suborders Hexacorallia and Octocorallia make up an order called Scyphopolypi of the class Scyphozoa. The rarely used name Hexacorallia Goette, 1902 is not to be confused with the taxon of the same name, i. e. Hexacorallia Haeckel, 1866, as used in current systems.

In 1908, Oskar Carlgren, in the multivolume book Dr. H.G. Bronn's Klassen und Ordnungen des Thier-Reichs, adopted Goette's name Hexacorallia, but used a different overall system — he has a subclass Hexacorallia in the class Anthozoa. In 1916, Gilbert Charles Bourne more or less agreed with Carlgren's system, but he did not agree with some of Calgren's names, so that he, i. a., renamed Calgren's subclass Hexacorallia back to subclass Ceriantipatharia. (Note: In the remaining part of this Wikipedia article, the name Hexacorallia means Hexacorallia Haeckel, 1866, i. e. it refers to hexacorals, not to Ceriantipatharia.)

In 1921, Thomas Alan Stephenson, in his On the classification of Actiniaria, adhered to Bourne's 1916 system, meaning that he has a subclass Ceriantipatharia in the class Anthozoa. But he notes that replacing the subclass Ceriantipatharia by two separate subclasses Cerinantharia and Antipatharia is an equally good arrangement.

In 1956, in the Treatise on Invertebrate Palaeontology, the authoritative multivolume treatise on invertebrates, the paleontologists John W. Wells and Dorothy Hill had a subclass Ceriantipatharia in the class Anthozoa. They added two more criteria to group the orders Ceriantharia and Antipatharia within the subclass Ceriantipatharia: Besides the structure of the larva cerinula already described in 1898 by van Beneden, they added that there were also similarities in the structure of the mesentery and in the mesenterial musculature.

In 1980, the palaeontologist Ulrich Lehmann and the geologist Gero Hillmer have a subclass Ceriantipatharia in the class Anthozoa in their book Wirbellose Tiere der Vorzeit (the English edition is called Fossil invertrebrates). This system was kept in the 1997 edition.

In 1982, in her chapter of the synoptic classification Synopsis and Classification of Living Organisms edited by Sybil P. Parker, the cnidariologist D. Fautin (Dunn) adopted the system of the 1956 Treatise on Invertebrate Palaeontology, i. e. she has a subclass Ceriantipatharia in the class Anthozoa. She noted, however, that the content of Ceriantipatharia is sometimes included in the hexacorals (Zoantharia sensu lato). The same basic system is used by D. Fautin (Dunn) and Cadet Hammond Hand in the 1991 edition of Encyclopaedia Britannica, and it is still used in the current online version of the encyclopaedia (as of 2025). In 2000, D. Fautin Dunn did not accept Ceriantipatharia anymore – see below.

In the 1990 and 2003 editions of their book Invertebrates, the invertebrate zoologist Richard Charles Brusca and the marine biologist Gary John Brusca have a subclass Ceriantipatharia in the class Anthozoa. However, the 2016 edition of the same book does not accept Ceriantipatharia anymore and includes the orders Ceriantharia and Antipatharia in the subclass Hexacorallia (Zoantharia sensu lato).

In 1993, the palaeontologists John Nudds and Joseph John Sepkoski Jr., in The Fossil Record 2 edited by Michael Benton, have a subclass Ceriantipatharia in the class Anthozoa. A few years later, however, in his famous 2002 compendium, Sepkoski abandoned Ceriantipatharia and kept only its constituent orders.

In 1995, a study based on the ribosomal DNA of some species within Anthozoa, conducted by C. A. Chen et al., showed that the subclass Ceriantipatharia is a sister taxon to all other Anthozoa and thus it is the most representative taxon of the ancestral Anthozoa. However, the study actually did no analyze Ceriantipatharia, but only analysed a representative of Ceriantharia and no representative of Antipatharia.

In 1997, the palaeontologist Colin Thomas Scruton, in a prominent paper on extinct corals, had a subclass Ceriantipatharia in the class Anthozoa. He still had the subclass Ceriantipatharia in his system in 2021.

In 2004, Edward Ruppert et al., in the 7th edition of their university textbook Invertebrate Zoology, had an unranked clade Ceriantipatharia being included in (i. e. it is not sister to) the subclass hexacorals (Zoantharia sensu lato/Hexacorallia). They noted, however, that it is not certain whether Antipatharia belongs together with Ceriantharia. The book's 6th edition of 1994 had not accepted Ceriantipatharia.

In 2009, the Spanish paleontology university textbook Paleontología de invertebrados of M. L. M. Chacón et al. has a class Ceriantipatharia within the superclass Anthozoa.

In 2016, David Thomas Drumm et al. still use a subclass Ceriantipatharia in the class Anthozoa in their checklist of the marine macroinvertebrates of Alaska.

=== Texts not accepting Ceriantipatharia (since 1898) ===
Not all authors accepted the taxon Ceriantipatharia introduced in 1898. Examples follow:

In 1900, the zoologist Gilbert Charles Bourne, in a chapter of the multivolume book A Treatise on Zoology, does not seem to have taken into account van Beneden's 1898 text yet, because it does not occur in the sources cited. Bourne has ceriantharians and antipatharians (called Cerianthidea and Antipathidea by him) as separate orders within the grade Paramera (composed of ceriantharians, antipatharians, zoanthids and a part of actiniarians) of the subclass Zoantharia sensu lato of the class Anthozoa. 15 years later, in 1916, however, he accepted the taxon Ceriantipatharia – see above.

In 1901, the zoologist Yves Delage and the marine zoologist Edgard Hérouard explicitly mention in their multivolume treatise Traité de zoologie concrète that it is not correct to erect a taxon Ceriantipatharia. They have two separate suborders ceriantharians and antipatharians (called Cerianthidae and Antipathidae by them) of the order hexacorals (called Actinanthida by them) of the subclass anthozoans (called Anthozoariae by them).

In 1906, the zoologist Sydney John Hickson, in a chapter of the multivolume book The Cambridge natural history, treated ceriantharians and antipatharians (called Cerianthidea and Antipathidea/Antipatharia by Hickson) as separate orders within the subclass Zoantharia sensu lato of the class Anthozoa. A taxon Ceriantipatharia is not even mentioned, although he cites van Beneden's 1898 text.

In 1910, the zoologist James Playfair McMurrich, explicitly rejected van Beneden's Ceriantipatharia and treated Antipatharia and Ceriantharia as separate Anthozoan taxa, without specifying their ranks. In 1914, Franz Poche adopted McMurrich's system, but specified that McMurrich's antipatharians and ceriantharians (called Antipathidea and Cerianthidea by Poche) have the rank of orders in class Anthozoa.

In 1925, the extensive multivolume Handbuch der Zoologie, edited by Willy Kükenthal and others, did not accept the taxon Ceriantipatharia and it classified the orders Ceriantharia and Antipatharia as separate orders within the subclass Hexacorallia.

In 1940, the invertebrate zoologist Libbie Hyman, in her multivolume treatise The Invertebrates, in a sense, both did and did not accept Ceriantipatharia: She kept the orders Ceriantharia and Antipatharia separate, but nevertheless considered them sister taxa. She did not use, nor mention the name Ceriantipatharia, but used the informal designation "antipatharian-cerianthid line" instead (pp. 638–640). She considered the antipatharian-cerianthid line a sister taxon to octocorals (p. 640). The reason for treating Ceriantharia and Antipatharia as separate orders in her formal system could be that, as she states in the preface, she followed mainly the above-mentioned Handbuch der Zoologie, which she considered "the most extensive modern treatise on zoology" (p. 31) and whose basic system of Hexacorallia she followed closely (pp. 371–372).

In 1966, the marine biologist Cadet Hammond Hand showed, based on evidence from morphology and nematocysts, that the taxon Ceriantipatharia is not monophyletic. He suggested that dividing Anthozoa into four subclasses (Ceriantharia, Antipatharia, Zoantharia sensu lato and Alcyonaria sensu lato) could be justified.

In 1974, the zoologist Hajo Schmidt showed, using evidence from nematocysts and other factors, that the taxon Ceriantipatharia is not monophyletic because Ceriantharia is sister to all other hexacorals while Antipatharia is sister to Zoanthiniaria (i. e. it is nested within the main part of hexacorals).

In 1971, the German first edition of the multivolume book Grzimeks Tierleben (name of the English edition: Grzimek's Animal Life Encyclopedia) had separate orders Antipatharia and Ceriantharia within the subclass Hexaradiata (which is a synonym of what we now call Hexacorallia). In 2003, the international second edition used a similar system, except that the subclass was called Hexacorallia (or Zoantharia sensu lato). It also noted that "some authors classify the Ceriantharia and Antipatharia together in a third subclass, the Ceriantipatharia, but genetic evidence does not support this grouping."

In 2000, D. Fautin (Dunn) and Sandra L. Romano did not accept Ceriantipatharia on their Tree of Life Web Project webpage and treated Antipatharia and Ceriantharia as orders of the subclass hexacorals (Zoantharia sensu lato).

Since 1995, many molecular phylogenetic studies have determined that Ceriantharia and Antipatharia are not sister taxa. Therefore, the taxon Cerianthipatharia is not monophyletic and cannot be accepted in strictly phylogenetic systems. The same studies have shown that:

- the order Ceriantharia is most likely sister to (or the basal member of) Hexacorallia, although according to some studies it is sister to all other Anthozoa (or even to all other Cnidaria) or sister to Octocorallia, and
- the order Antipatharia is nested somewhere within Hexacorallia.

While it seems to be clear that Antipatharia is not sister to Ceriantharia, it is disputed where exactly Antipatharia belongs within Hexacorallia.

Several current systems just include Ceriantharia and Antipatharia as orders within Hexacorallia without specifying their exact position within it. Sometimes, Antipatharia is treated as an order within Hexacorallia, while Ceriantharia has the same rank as Hexacorallia. Won et al. 2001 suggested keeping the subclass Ceriantipatharia but reducing it to the order Ceriantharia only, while Antipatharia is included in the subclass hexacorals (Zoantharia sensu lato). The Polish palaentologist Jerzy Dzik, atypically, includes the orders Ceriantharia and Antipatharia in the subclass Rugosa of the class Anthozoa.
