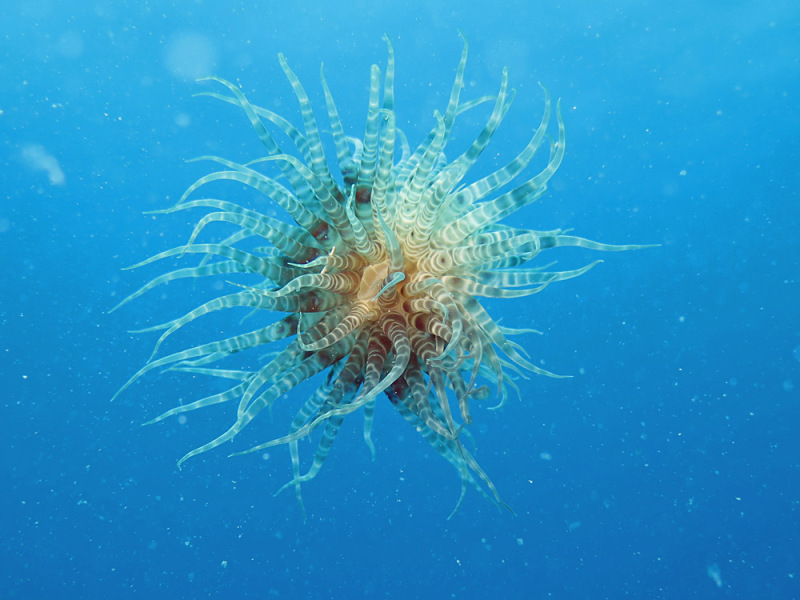

Scientific classification
- Kingdom: Animalia
- Phylum: Cnidaria
- Subphylum: Anthozoa
- Class: Hexacorallia
- Order: Actiniaria
- Family: Boloceroididae
- Genus: Boloceroides; Carlgren, 1899

Type species
- Bolocera mcmurrichi Kwietniewski, 1898

= Boloceroides =

Genus of sea anemones

Boloceroides is a genus of sea anemones in the family Boloceroididae. It is monotypic, the sole species being Boloceroides mcmurrichi. It has a cosmopolitan distribution in tropical and temperate oceans.
