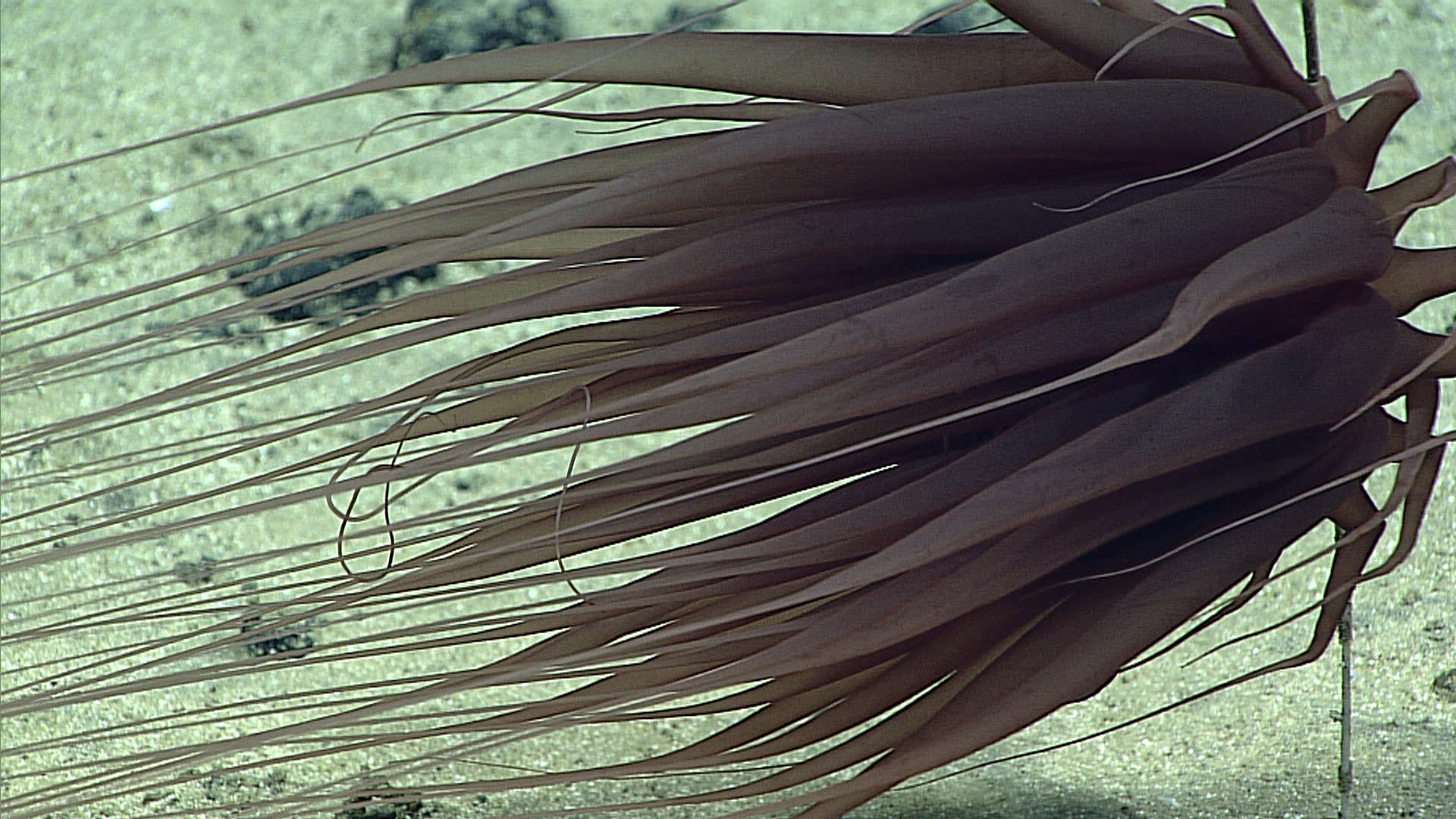

Scientific classification
- Kingdom: Animalia
- Phylum: Cnidaria
- Subphylum: Anthozoa
- Class: Hexacorallia
- Order: Actiniaria
- Suborder: Helenmonae; Daly & Rodríguez, 2019
- Family: Relicanthidae; Rodríguez & Daly, 2014
- Genus: Relicanthus; Rodríguez & Daly, 2014
- Species: R. daphneae

Binomial name
- Relicanthus daphneae (Daly, 2006)

Synonyms
- Boloceroides daphneae Daly, 2006 (unaccepted: junior synonym)

= Relicanthus daphneae =

Species of incertae sedis hexacorallian

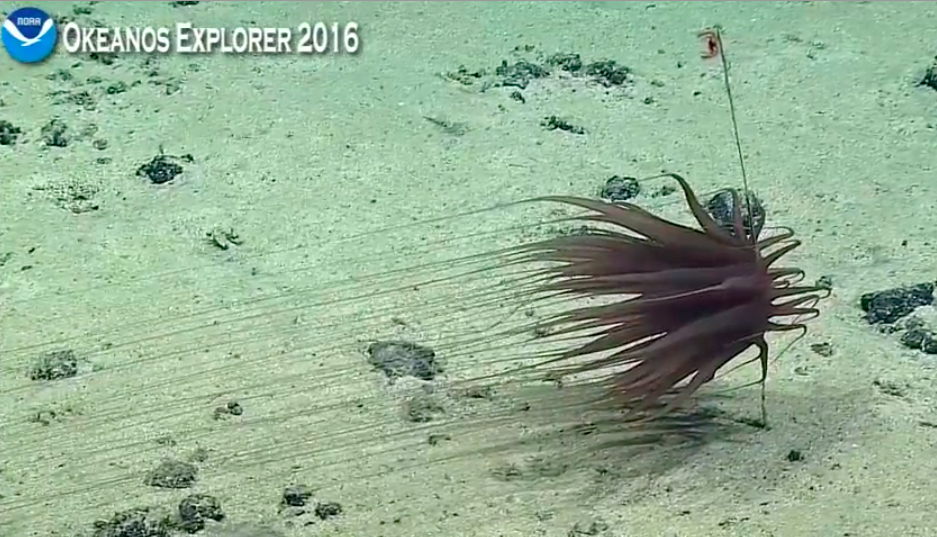
A Relicanthus attached to a dead sponge stalk

Relicanthus daphneae is a cnidarian which occurs in the depths of the East Pacific Rise and was described in 2006. It is the only known member of the suborder Helenmonae within the order Actiniaria.

== Taxonomy ==
Relicanthus daphneae was originally described as a member of the genus Boloceroides, but the name (and synonym) Boloceroides daphneae is no longer accepted after it was determined that this species belongs in the genus Relicanthus.

A phylogenetic study was completed in 2014, in which three genes of mitochondrial DNA and two genes from the nucleus of over a hundred different sea anemones were compared, suggesting that the species instead belonged in a new order of Hexacorallia. A new genus, Relicanthus, was named to accommodate this alternate classification. The specific name daphneae was chosen after Daphne Gail Fautin, a scientist who primarily studied sea anemones, "in honor of her contributions to actiniarian systematics".

In December 2019 the American Museum of Natural History announced that new research had classified R. daphneae as a new suborder of Actiniaria, Helenmonae, rather than as a new order. This new classification was later confirmed by another phylogenetic study.

== Description ==
R. daphneae has a pink-colored cylindrical body capable of reaching a meter (3 ft) across, with long, thin, whitish tentacles up to two meters (7 ft) in length. The body is divided into 24 septa. The muscles of the mesenteries are less developed. The spirocysts, which are stinging cells in which the stinging tube is spirally rolled up and which are covered with adhesive threads instead of spines, are larger than those of any other deep-sea species and among the largest of all cnidarians.

== Habitat and range ==
Its habitat is the ocean floor, associated with the periphery of hydrothermal vents. Its range is known to be in the Lau Basin, Eastern Pacific, from where the type specimen was collected by the submersible DSV Alvin, but it may extend beyond that.
