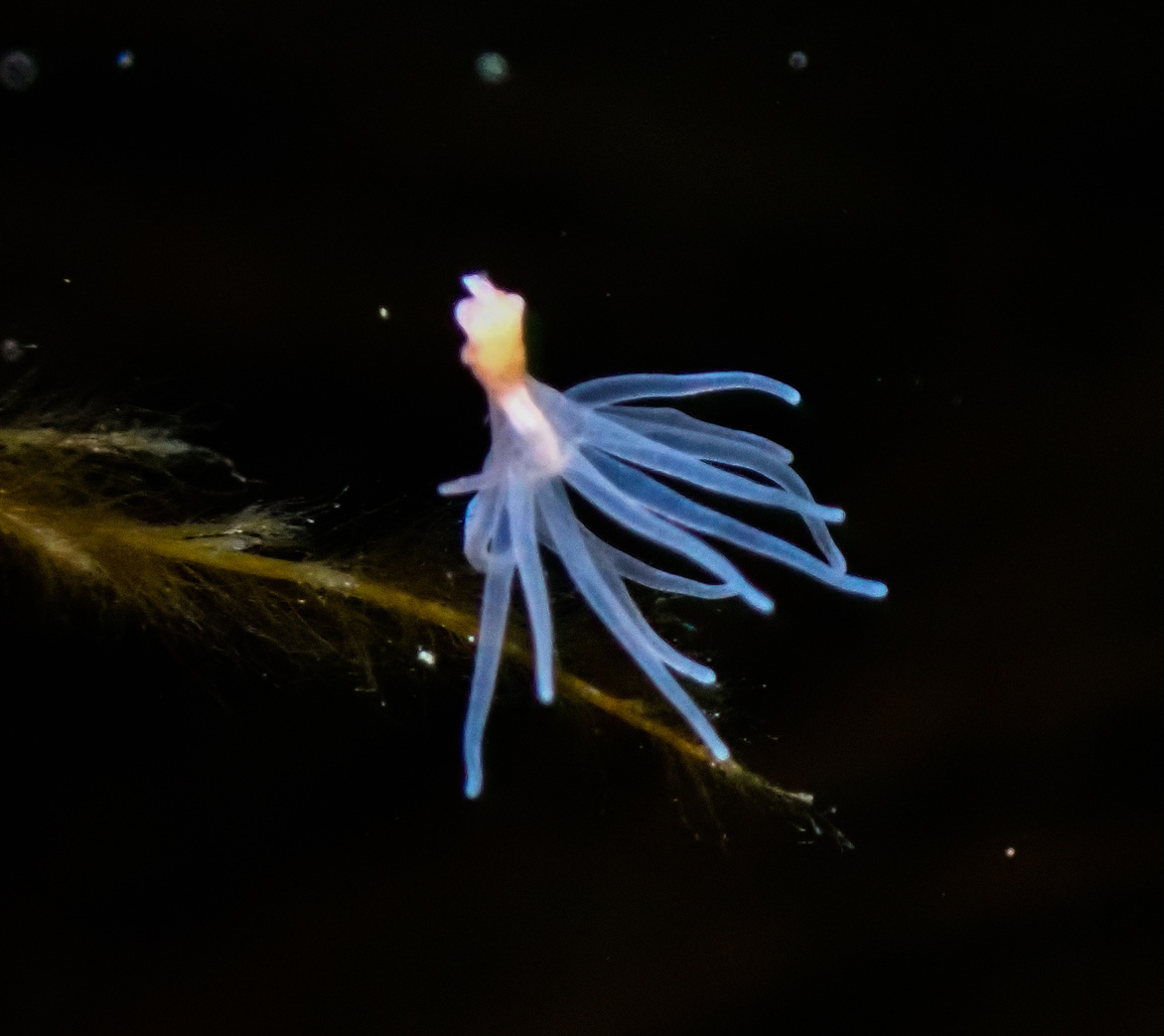
- Gonactinia prolifera

Scientific classification
- Kingdom: Animalia
- Phylum: Cnidaria
- Subphylum: Anthozoa
- Class: Hexacorallia
- Order: Actiniaria
- Family: Gonactiniidae
- Genus: Gonactinia; Sars, 1851
- Species: G. prolifera

Binomial name
- Gonactinia prolifera (Sars, 1835)

Synonyms
- (Genus): Gonactia Sars, 1851; Gonactinea Sars, 1851; (Species): Actinia prolifera Sars, 1835; Gonactia prolifera; Gonactinea prolifera

= Gonactinia =

Gonactinia prolifera

Genus of sea anemones

Gonactinia is a monotypic genus of sea anemones, and G. prolifera is the only species in the genus. It is sometimes called the storey anemone and is found on either side of the northern Atlantic Ocean.

== Distribution and habitat ==
Gonactinia prolifera is known from either side of the northern Atlantic Ocean including Maine and northwestern Europe, from the Mediterranean Sea, and the southern Pacific Ocean, including the coasts of New Zealand and Chile. Its natural habitat is on rocks, but it is also found on mollusc shells and large fronds of algae, from the fore-shore down to depths of about 100 m (330 ft).

== Biology ==
Like other sea anemones, G. prolifera is a predator, catching plankton with its tentacles. When a prey item is encountered, a rhythmic succession of reflex actions take place by which the food particle is passed by the tentacles to the mouth and then swallowed. Locomotion is by "walking" or swimming. The anemone walks by making a series of short, looping steps, first extending its column parallel with the substrate, then attaching one tentacle to the substrate by means of the cnidocytes, detaching the pedal base, reattaching it close to the single, now contracted, tentacle, releasing this tentacle and straightening up. Each step takes half a minute or more and advances the anemone a few millimetres. Swimming is done by rapid movements of the tentacles beating synchronously; the tentacles are used like oars and a bout of swimming may consist of ten to thirty strokes. Swimming takes place after the anemone is stimulated sharply in some way or is attacked by a nudibranch.

This sea anemone is able to divide repeatedly by transverse fission, an unusual behaviour which also occurs in Anthopleura stellula. A rudimentary band of tentacles begins to grow on the column, after which the upper and lower regions pull themselves apart. The upper part grows a new pedal disc and the lower part a new oral disc with tentacles. Sometimes the first signs of the following transverse fission appear before the previous one is completed and the surfaces healed.
