= Carrickaness Sandstone =

Geologic formation in Northern Ireland

- Stratigraphic range: Carboniferous
- Type: Formation

Location
- Region: Northern Ireland
- Country: United Kingdom

The Carrickaness Sandstone is a geologic formation in Northern Ireland. It preserves fossils dating back to the Carboniferous period.

== See also ==
- List of fossiliferous stratigraphic units in Northern Ireland
