= Daphne Gail Fautin =

American zoologist (1946–2021)

- Born: 25 May 1946
- Died: 12 March 2021 (aged 74)
- Education: Beloit College (BS); University of California, Berkeley (PhD)
- Known for: Extensive work and publications studying and classifying sea anemones and related genera
- Scientific career
- Fields: Invertebrate zoology
- Workplaces: University of Kansas, University of Kansas Natural History Museum

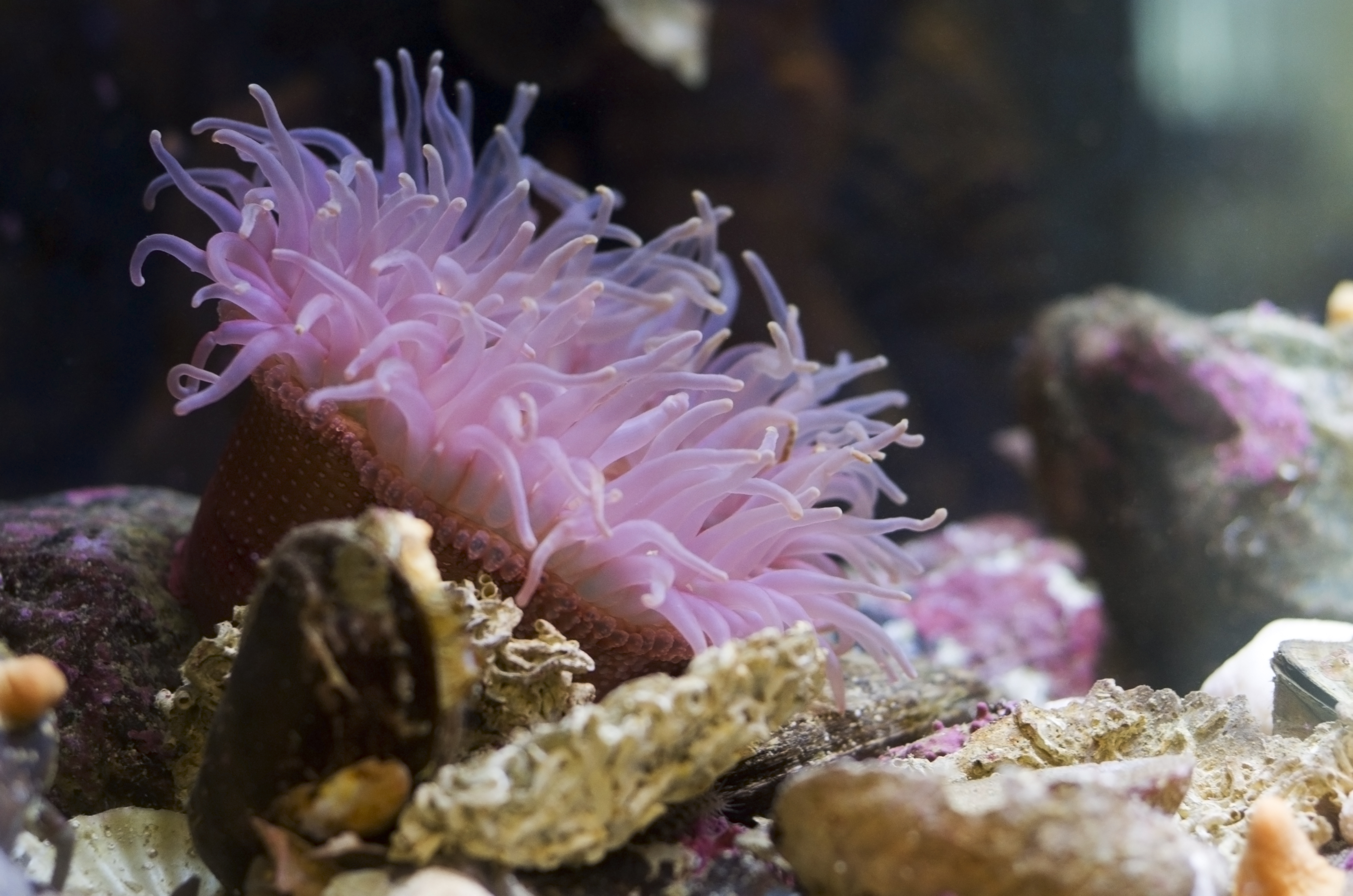
A sea anemone

Daphne Gail Fautin (25 May 1946 – 12 March 2021) was an American professor of invertebrate zoology at the University of Kansas, specializing in sea anemones and symbiosis. She is world-renowned for her extensive work studying and classifying sea anemones and related species.

== Education ==
Fautin received her B.S. in biology (magna cum laude) in 1966 from Beloit College, Beloit, Wisconsin (where she taught as a visiting professor in the mid-1980s), and her Ph.D. in zoology in 1972 from the University of California, Berkeley. Her Ph.D. dissertation was "Natural History of the Sea Anemone Epiactis prolifera Verrill, 1869, with Special Reference to Its Reproductive Biology." She studied everything about sea anemones, such as health and reproduction.

== Career ==
Fautin published numerous scientific articles and texts—including co-authoring Encyclopædia Britannica's entry on cnidarians—and her publications have been widely cited by other researchers in the field. From 1995 to 2014, Fautin served as the first faculty-curator of Invertebrate Zoology at the University of Kansas Natural History Museum (now called the KU Biodiversity Institute and Natural History Museum). Fautin played a key role in advancing global marine biodiversity data accessibility, contributing to the early efforts of integrating species into international databases such as the Ocean Biodiversity Information System (OBIS) and the World Register of Marine Species (WoRMS), helping standardized taxonimic information for researchers worldwide.

In her career, Fautin personally identified at least 19 new species. Fautin has been called "the world authority on [sea] anemones", by Prof. J. Frederick Grassle of Rutgers University, who led the international Census of Marine Life completed in 2010. As part of the Census, she co-created with her husband, Prof. R. W. Buddemeier of the Kansas Geological Survey, an extensive database of hexacorals and related species. This database was later absorbed into Ocean Biodiversity Information System (OBIS) and World Register of Marine Species (WoRMS). Fautin was a founding member of OBIS's first international committee. Furthermore, she served as the vice-chair of the Global Biodiversity Information Facility (GBIF) science committee.

Fautin served as vice president and commissioner of the International Commission on Zoological Nomenclature, overseeing the naming of new species. She served as the editor of the scientific journal Annual Review of Ecology and Systematics (1992-2001).

Although she lived and worked in landlocked Lawrence, Kansas, she felt that working from dry land was not a serious impediment, stating that "you only need to be near an airport, not the ocean." She died on March 12, 2021.

== Eponym ==
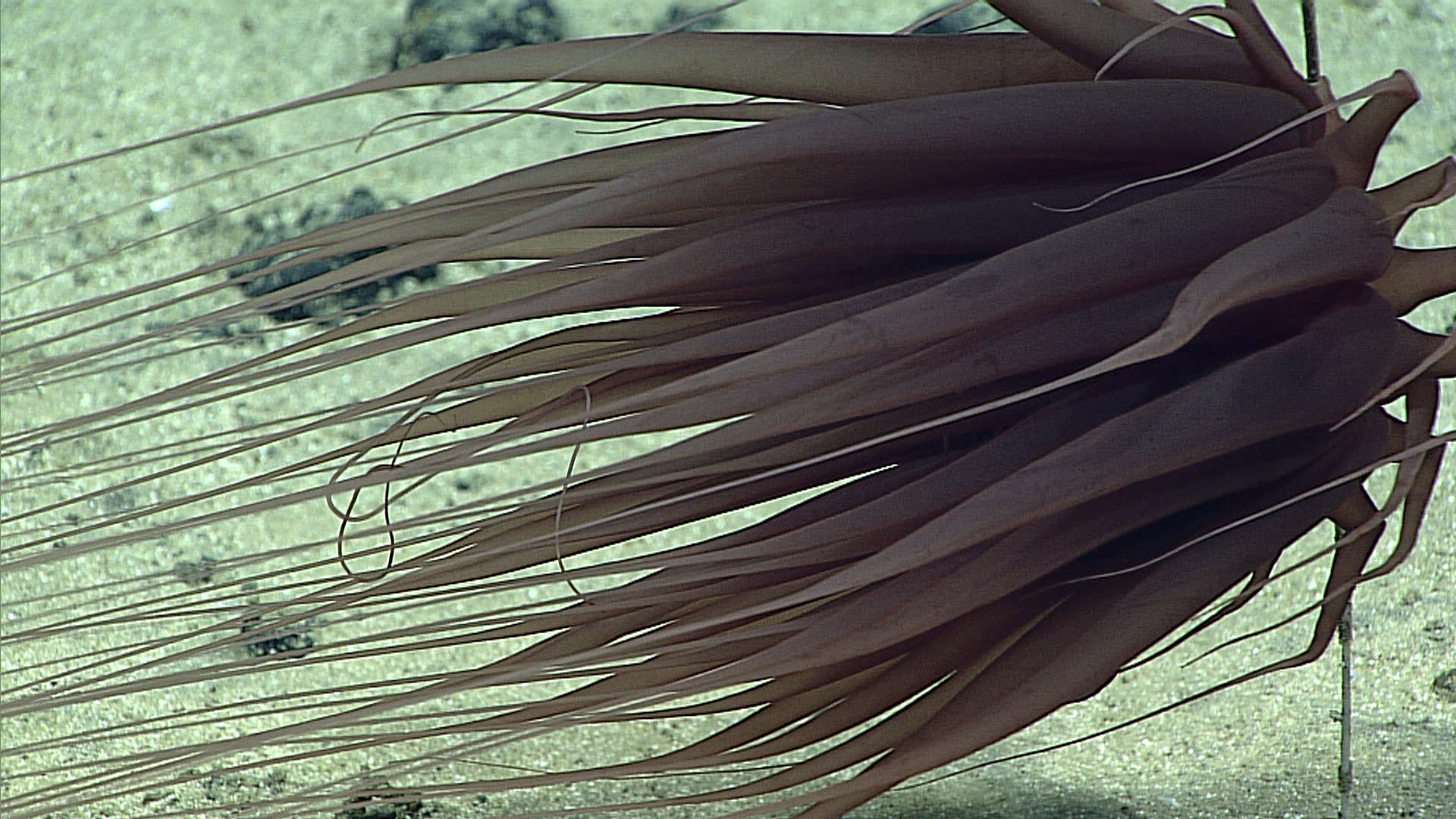
An example of Relicanthus daphneae, named after Fautin

A large sea anemone-like cnidarian species, Relicanthus daphneae, was named in Fautin's honor. Originally called Boloceroides daphneae, it was renamed to Relicanthus daphneae after it was discovered (using DNA-based identification techniques) to belong to a previously unknown cnidarian order.

The Tiger anemone, Macrodactyla fautinae, was also named in Fautin's honor, as it was a species she studied, but was unable to identify.
