= Tirnaskea Formation =

Geologic formation in Northern Ireland

- Stratigraphic range: Ordovician
- Type: Formation

Location
- Region: Northern Ireland
- Country: United Kingdom

The Tirnaskea Formation is a geologic formation in Northern Ireland. It preserves fossils dating back to the Ordovician period.

== See also ==
- List of fossiliferous stratigraphic units in Northern Ireland
- Geography of Ireland
- Ireland
