= List of fossiliferous stratigraphic units in Northern Ireland =

Group or Formation	Period	Notes
Bardahessiagh Formation	Ordovician	
Blackstokes Limestone Formation	Carboniferous	
Blackwater Limestone Formation	Carboniferous	
Carrickaness Sandstone Formation	Carboniferous	
Chalk Marl Formation	Cretaceous	
Glauconitic Chalk Formation	Cretaceous	
Glencar Formation	Carboniferous	
Killey Bridge Formation	Ordovician	
Lias Formation	Jurassic	
Lias Group/Waterloo Mudstone Formation	Jurassic	
Limehill Beds Formation	Silurian	
Maydown Limestone Formation	Carboniferous	
Pernarth Group/Westbury Formation	Triassic	
Tirnaskea Formation	Ordovician	
Waterloo Formation	Jurassic	
White Limestone Formation	Cretaceous	

== See also ==
- Lists of fossiliferous stratigraphic units in Europe
- Lists of fossiliferous stratigraphic units in the United Kingdom
