= Kirkcolm Formation =

Geological formation in Scotland

- Stratigraphic range: Ordovician
- Type: Formation

Location
- Region: Scotland
- Country: United Kingdom

The Kirkcolm Formation is a geological formation in Scotland. It preserves fossils dating back to the Ordovician period.

== See also ==
- List of fossiliferous stratigraphic units in Scotland
