= Bardahessiagh Formation =

Geological formation in Northern Ireland

- Stratigraphic range: Ordovician
- Type: Formation

Location
- Region: Northern Ireland
- Country: United Kingdom

The Bardahessiagh Formation is a geological formation in Northern Ireland. It has been described from a locality lying about 3 km NNE of Pomeroy, south of Craigbardahessiagh. It is now known as comprising the former ‘Bardahessiagh Formation’, or Bardahessiagh Beds and the ‘Junction Beds’ that is underlain by a stratigraphical unit not recognised, until fieldwork by the Ulster Museum staff in 1992. The Bardahessiagh Formation is divided into three units, but the summit of the formation is not known. Field evidence indicates that the local top of the formation is characterised by a thrust contact with the Killey Bridge and Tirnaskea Formation (upper Katian and Hirnantian, respectively), exposed south of the Well Field, which lies 650 metres SSW of Craigbardahessiagh.

Constraints on the age of the formation is based on the brachiopod faunas and an upper Sandbian to lower Katian age has been proposed.

The Bardahessiagh Formation preserves a diverse and well-preserved assemblage of fossils. Only the brachiopods, cephalopods, bivalves and kilbuchophyllid corals have been systematically described.

Based on the brachiopod faunas, the Bardahessiagh Formation has been interpreted as deposited in a transgressive regime, below storm-wave base environments, peaking in the second unit, with the presence of typical Sericoidea association (Candela 2001, 2006).

== See also ==
- List of fossiliferous stratigraphic units in Northern Ireland
