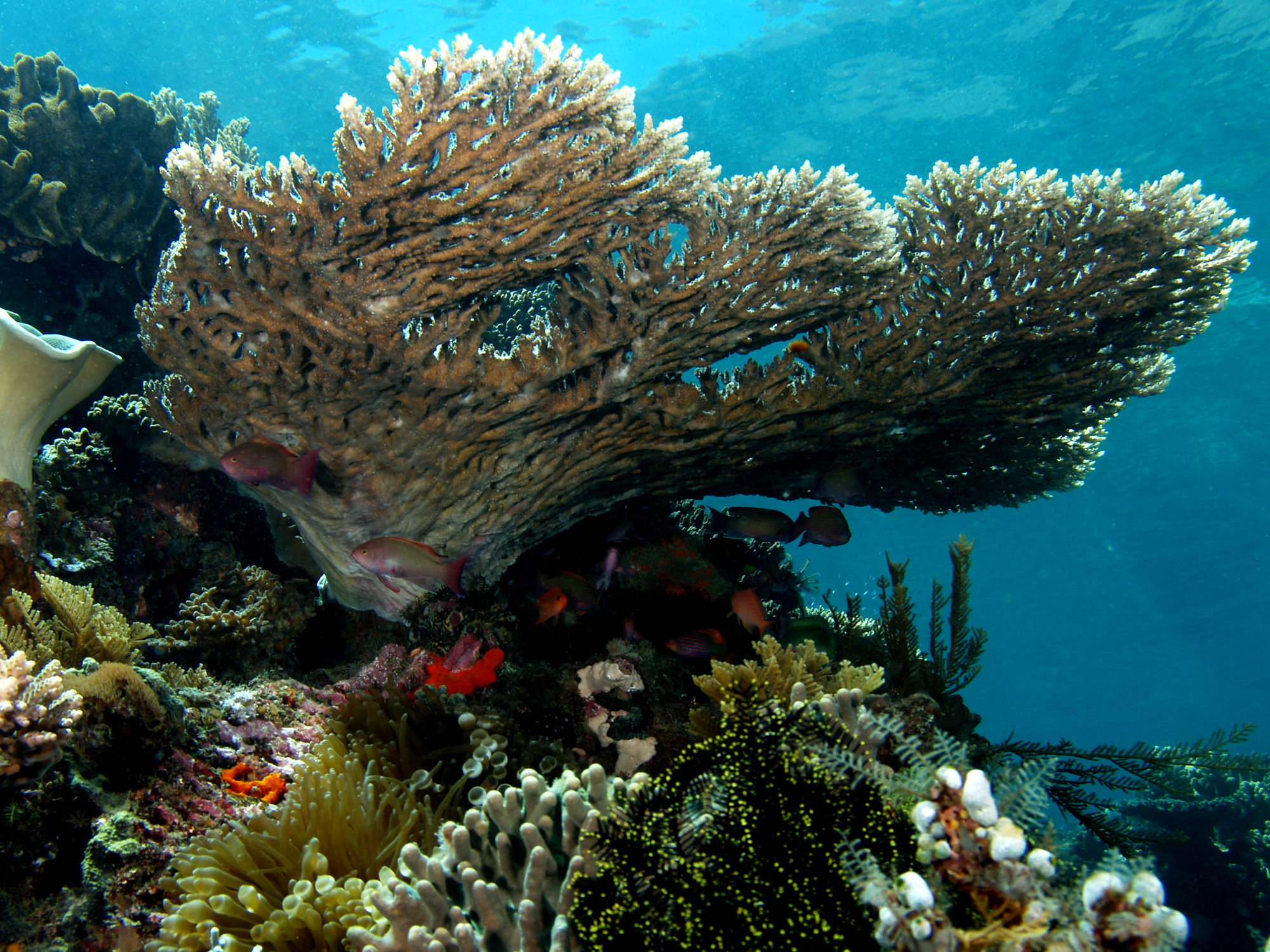
- A stony coral, Acropora latistella

Scientific classification
- Kingdom: Animalia
- Phylum: Cnidaria
- Subphylum: Anthozoa
- Class: Hexacorallia; Haeckel, 1896

Orders
- See text.

= Hexacorallia =

Hexacorallia Temporal range: Fortunian–Present

Class of cnidarians with 6-fold symmetry

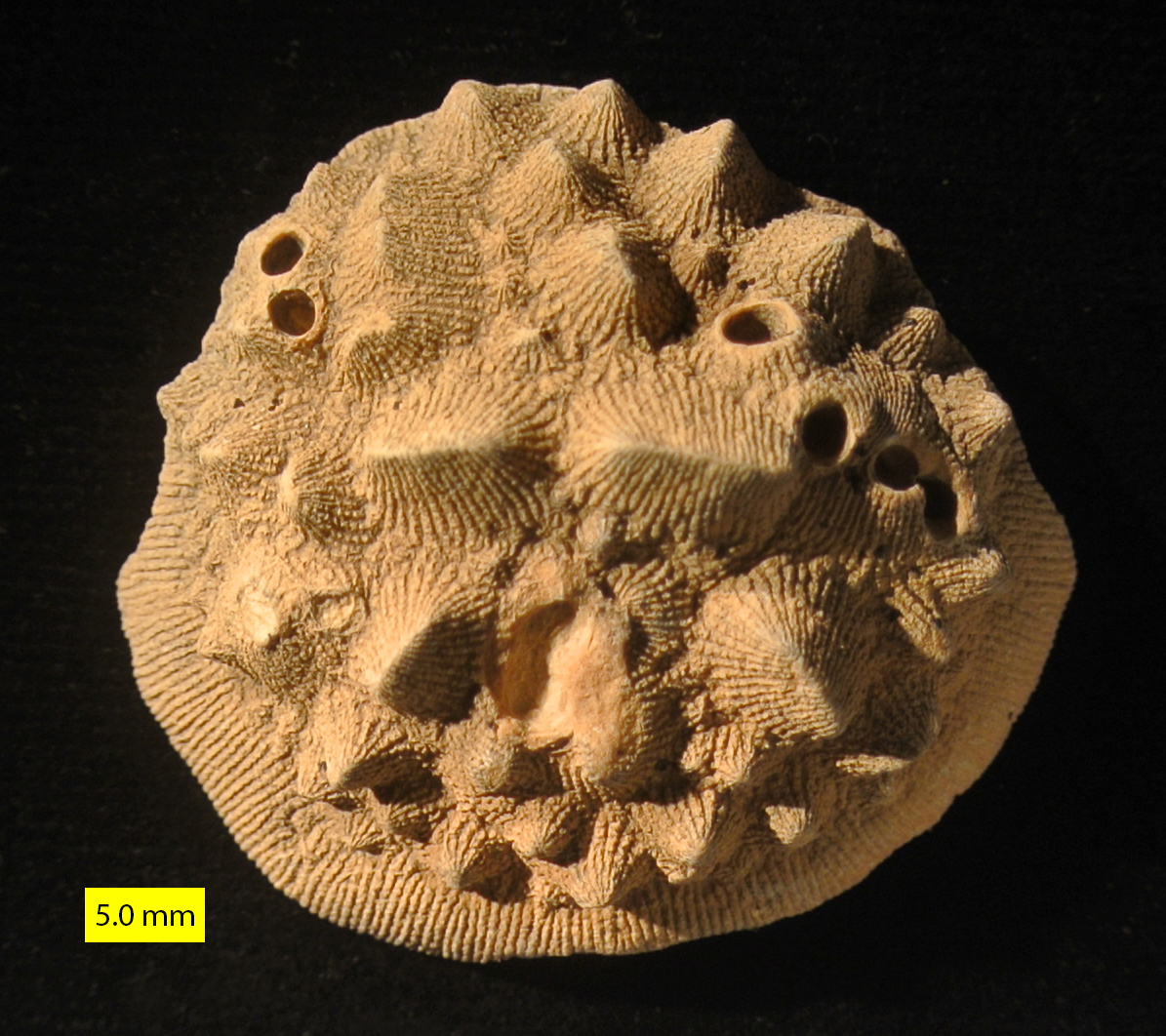
Aspidiscus cristatus from the Cenomanian (Upper Cretaceous) of southern Israel; oral view.

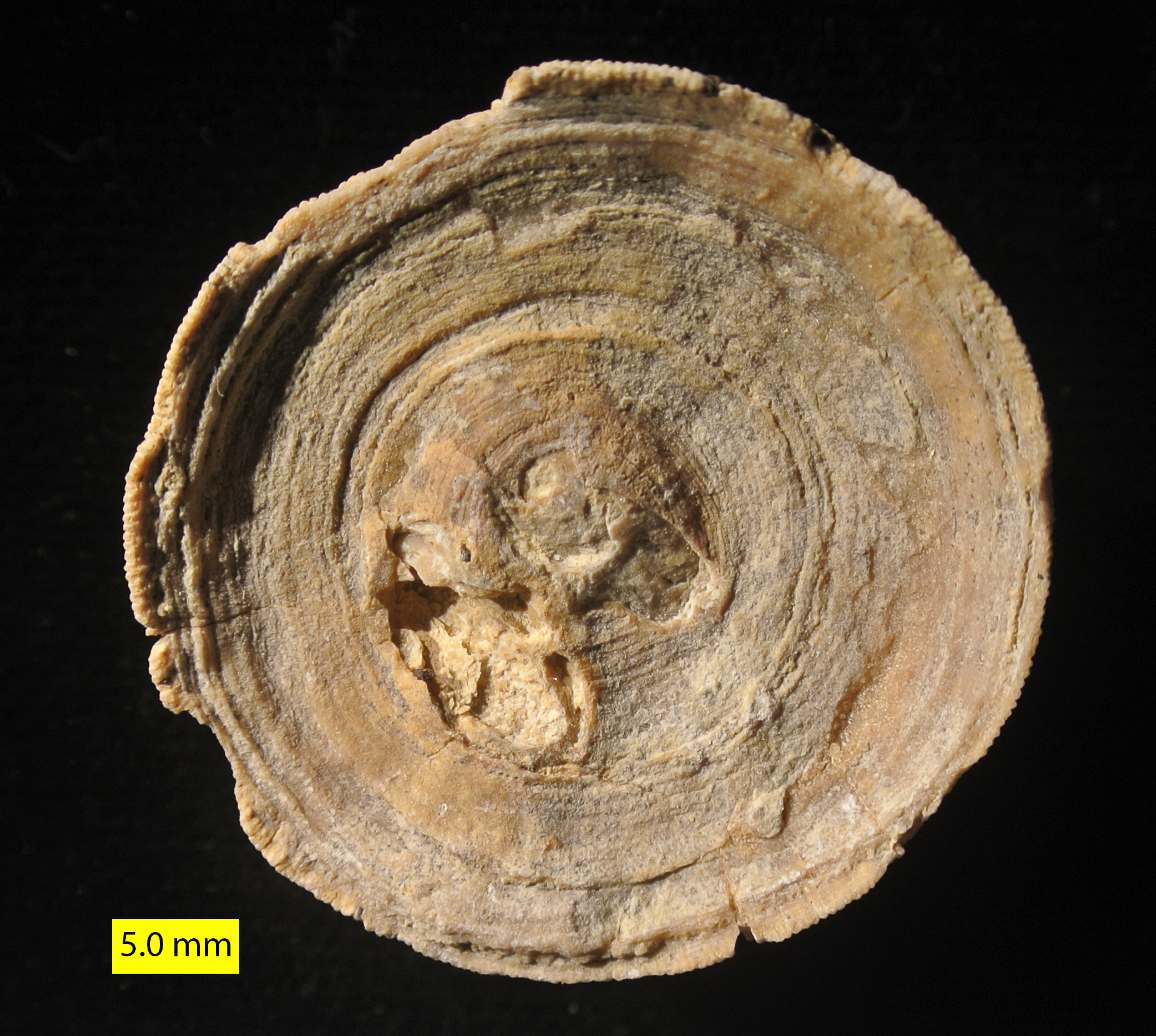
Aspidiscus cristatus from the Cenomanian (Upper Cretaceous) of southern Israel; aboral view.

Hexacorallia (synonym: Zoantharia; older synonyms: Hexacoralla, Hexaradiata, Hexactinia, Actinanthida; in English: hexacorals, hexacorallians, zoantharians) is a class of Anthozoa.

== Other meanings ==
Both names, i. e. Hexacorallia and Zoantharia, and their English equivalents, also have narrower meanings - see below in the chapter Taxonomy. The name Hexacorallia also has a rare meaning unrelated to the content of this article - it is used as a synonym of the name Ceriantipatharia.

== Characteristics ==
Hexacorals are aquatic organisms formed of polyps, generally with 6-fold symmetry. The number of hexacoral species is approximately 4,300 (as estimated in 1987). Extant hexacorals are composed of 6 orders: the tube anemones (Ceriantharia), zoanthids (Zoanthiniaria), sea anemones (Actiniaria), corallimorpharians (Corallimorpharia), the black corals (Antipatharia) and the stony corals (Scleractinia). The first four orders are skeleton-less, while the last two orders have a skeleton. Some of the Scleractinia are coral-reef builders.

The Hexacorallia are distinguished from another class of Anthozoa, Octocorallia, in having eight or fewer axes of symmetry in their body structure; the tentacles are simple and unbranched and normally number more than eight. These organisms are formed of individual soft polyps, which in some species live in colonies and can secrete a calcite skeleton. As with all Cnidarians, these organisms have a complex life cycle including a motile planktonic phase and a later characteristic sessile phase. Hexacorallia also includes the significant extinct order of rugose corals.

The taxon Hexacorallia is considered to be monophyletic, that is, all contained species are descended from a common ancestor.

== Sea anemones ==
Certain or all skeleton-less hexacorals are called sea anemones in the literature. More specifically, sea anemones can mean one of the following:

- Actiniaria only (see Taxonomy below), or
- Actiniaria and Corallimorpharia, or
- Actiniaria and Zoanthiniaria, or
- Actiniaria, Corallimorpharia and Zoanthiniaria, or
- Actiniaria, Corallimorpharia, Zoanthiniaria and Ceriantharia.

== Taxonomy ==
=== Phylogenetic classification ===
The current system is shown below:

class (or subclass) Hexacorallia [aka: Zoantharia]:

- order Ceriantharia - tube anemones [aka: tube-dwelling anemones, ceriantharians] (This order is sometimes placed outside Hexacorallia as a separate (sub)class.)
- unnamed clade (i. e. Zoanthiniaria and related taxa):
  - order Zoanthiniaria [aka: Zoantharia sensu stricto, Zoanthidea ] – zoanthids [aka: zoanthiniarians, zoantharians (proper), collonial anemones, button polyps]
  - ?†Coralomorpha - coralomorphs (This is a semi-formal grouping of problematic genera, which in a broader sense also includes the below mentioned Tabulaconida and Cothoniida, as well as the †Hydroconozoa.)
  - order †Tabulaconida
  - order †Cothoniida
  - order †Tabulata (incl. †Heliolitida) – tabular corals [aka: tabulates] (In older systems, the Tabulata also included the chaetetids, but these are now usually placed in Porifera. Moreover, the Tabulata were formerly sometimes placed outside Hexacorallia as a separate (sub)class.)
  - order †Rugosa [aka: Tetracorallia, Pterocorallia] (incl. †Calyxocorallia) – rugose corals [aka: rugosans, tetracorals] (The Rugosa were formerly sometimes placed outside Hexacorallia as a separate (sub)class.)
- Hexactiniaria:
  - order Actiniaria (incl. †Ptychodactiaria) – sea anemones [aka: actiniarians]
  - order Corallimorpharia – corallimorpharians [aka: false corals, mushroom corals, coral-like anemones] (In palaentology, corallimorpharians are considered closely related to or even included in Actiniaria. But in texts dealing only with recent organisms, coralimorpharians are considered related to or even included in Scleractinia and the Corallimorpharia-Scleractinia clade is sometimes called Coralliformes. Corallimorpharia is not to be confused with Coralomorpha.)
  - order †Kilbuchophyllida (This is sometimes included in Scleractinia.)
  - order †Numidiaphyllida (This is sometimes included in Scleractinia.)
  - order Scleractinia [aka: Hexacorallia sensu stricto, Madreporaria, Cyclocorallia] (incl. †Hexanthiniaria) – stony corals [aka: hard corals, scleractinian corals, hexacorals (proper), madreporarians]
- incertae sedis:
  - order Antipatharia – antipatharians [aka: black corals] (This order probably belongs next to or inside Hexactiniaria.)
  - family Relicanthidae

The order †Heterocorallia (heterocorals), until recently considered related to or included in Rugosa, is now included in octocorals.

Ceriantharia and Antipatharia were formerly jointly classified in a taxon called Ceriantipatharia, which was considered a separate (sub)class outside Hexacorallia.

=== Skeleton-based classification ===
Based on the type of their skeleton, the hexacorals are divided into sea anemones, antipatharians and (Hexacorallian) corals. More specifically:

- The Ceriantharia, Zoanthiniaria, Actiniaria, Corallimorpharia and Relicanthidae have no skeleton, i. e. they are "soft", and are therefore called sea anemones. Note that the definition of the term sea anemone can vary (see the above chapter Sea anemones).
- The Antipatharia have a horn-like - and therefore flexible - skeleton.
- All the remaining (recent and fossil) taxa of the above system have a calcium carbonate - and therefore rigid ("hard") - skeleton, which, in this class, is always compact. They therefore constitute the main group of what is usually called corals (i. e. anthozoans and hydrozoans with a compact rigid skeleton). Note that the definition of the term coral can vary, for example octocorals without a compact skeleton and Antipatharia are sometimes also included in the term corals.

In the 19th century, this skeleton-based division into three parts was also the standard formal way of subdividing the taxon hexacorals, i. e. the Hexacorallia [aka Zoantharia] consisted of the taxa (orders):

- Actiniaria sensu lato [aka: Zoantharia malacodermata], i.e the sea anemones in the broadest sense;
- Antipatharia [aka: Zoantharia sclerobasica], i. e. the same as today's antipatharians;
- Madreporaria sensu lato [aka: Zoantharia sclerodermata], i. e. all the rest, meaning all Hexacorallian corals.
