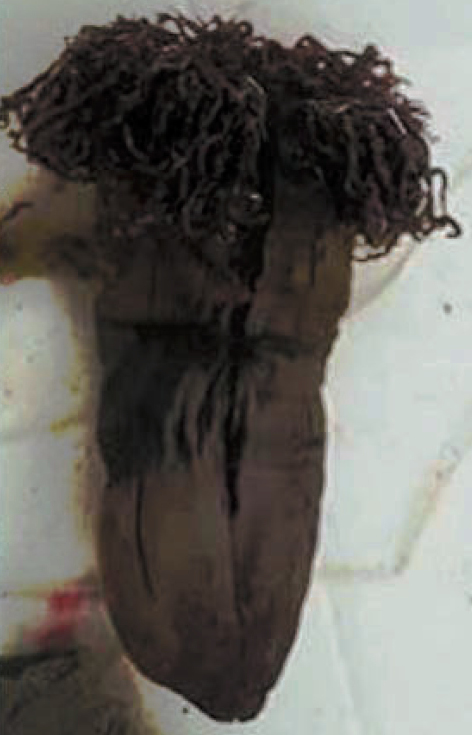

Scientific classification
- Kingdom: Animalia
- Phylum: Cnidaria
- Subphylum: Anthozoa
- Class: Hexacorallia
- Order: Ceriantharia
- Family: Cerianthidae
- Genus: Ceriantheomorphe
- Species: C. brasiliensis

Binomial name
- Ceriantheomorphe brasiliensis Carlgren, 1931

= Ceriantheomorphe brasiliensis =

Species of sea anemone

Ceriantheomorphe brasiliensis is a species of tube-dwelling anemones in the family Cerianthidae. It is found in the tropical western Atlantic Ocean, the Caribbean Sea and the Gulf of Mexico. It is currently listed as endangered based on a lack of evidence.

== Distribution and habitat ==
Ceriantheomorphe brasiliensis is known from shallow water in the tropical western Atlantic Ocean. C. brasiliensis can be found from Texas through the Gulf of Mexico, but is typically found in northeastern Brazil. It is found in deep soft sand or muddy sand and retreats into its burrow during the day. The only other cerianthid found in the Gulf of Mexico is Ceriantheopsis americanus. They burrow in loose substrate in relatively shallow waters, between the low tide and sublittoral zone. During the day, the animal retreats into its dwelling tube, and at night it extends its tentacles from the tube.

== Ecology ==
Ceriantheomorphe brasiliensis constructs a long, tough tube to line its burrow, strengthening it with mucus secretions. The tube is made with a felt of very long, discharged nematocyst cells and is sufficiently rigid for it to be excavated intact from the surrounding sediment. The tentacles are assorted into two distinct marginal and labial cycles, each arranged into four pseudo-cycles with yellow coloration on the end of each tentacle. The marginal tentacles are located on the peripheral and are much longer than the labial. Ceriantharia have adapted large pores on the surface of their tentacles as a mechanism to retract into their tubes to avoid predation faster. The tube is approximately 1–3 cm thick in adults, but it can be much thinner in younger or smaller species. Other species of Cerianthidae have various tube lengths, while C. brasiliensis' tube is relatively short. When the species is removed from its tube, it can regenerate a very thin replacement within 12 hours. Within 7–10 days, the tube can reach a thickness again that will help protect it from predators. The tube production starts in an area around the tentacles and continues in a ring formation down the body of the anemone, meaning it has an open end in the basal region. Additionally, since there is no limit to how far the anemone can lower itself into its tube, it can use this as a means to escape predation. The Phoronid worm species Phoronis australis has an obligate commensalism relationship with C. braziliensis, where it gets a substrate, food, and protection from predation from the anemone.

== Metamorphosis ==
There is not much known about the larval stage of cerianthids, however it is suspected that they have adaptations for a relatively long planktonic larva stage. Tube formation starts soon after the settlement of the larva, when it then starts to secrete mucus. It was once thought that the mucus production caused the formation of the tube, however it is now understood that cnida are responsible. The tube is made by forming woven layers of adhesive tissues, which traps small amounts of sediments and Foraminifera tests. This is a defining characteristic of cerianthids.

== Threats ==
Brazilian Institute of Environment and Renewable Natural Resources (IBAMA) listed C. brasiliensis as an endangered species based on the fact that enough evidence has been collected to study this issue, and requires more scientific, comprehensive review for clarification. It is thought that this animal is highly targeted for illegal animal trafficking. This species is thought to be endangered because of their low population numbers and it lives in an extremely at-risk area. Trawling of benthic communities on the continental shelf results in the destruction of invertebrate communities. It can also be used as an aquarium ornament, which puts it at risk to the threat of overexploitation. Populations of C. brasiliensis only appear in marine protected areas.
