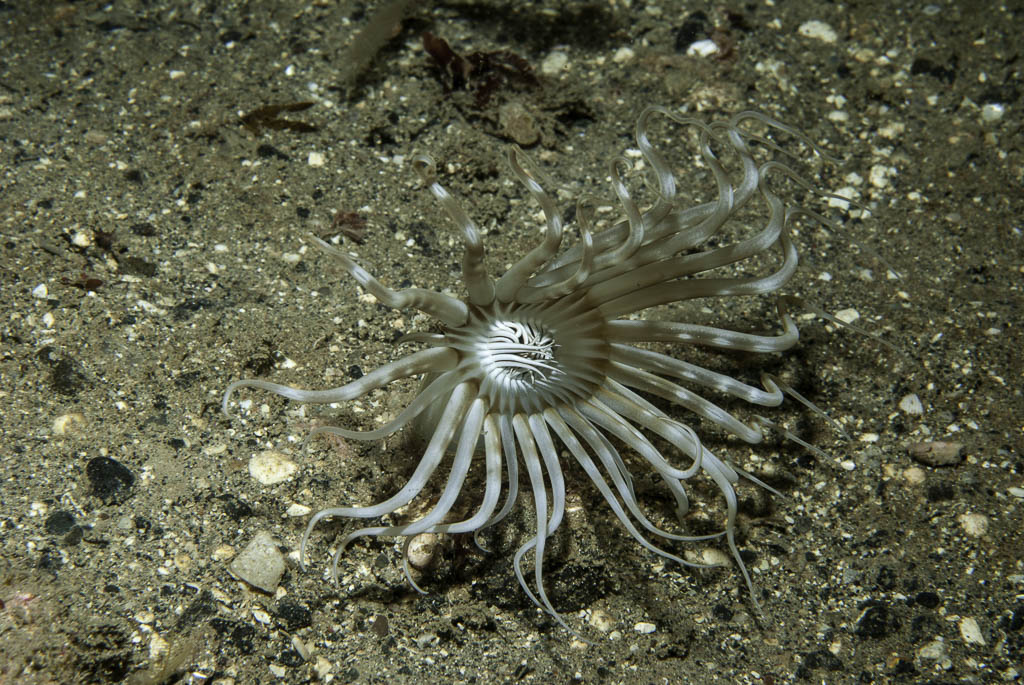
- Off Rathlin Island, Northern Ireland.

Scientific classification
- Domain: Eukaryota
- Kingdom: Animalia
- Phylum: Cnidaria
- Subclass: Ceriantharia
- Order: Penicillaria
- Family: Arachnactidae
- Genus: Arachnanthus
- Species: A. sarsi

Binomial name
- Arachnanthus sarsi Carlgren, 1912

= Arachnanthus sarsi =

Species of sea anemone

Arachnanthus sarsi is a species of tube-dwelling anemone in the family Arachnactidae. This species is found in the North Atlantic in subtidal sand or muddy sand at depths of 15–130 m.

== Description ==
This is a large sea anemone, with a diameter of up to 20 cm (8 in) when fully expanded and a height of a similar amount. There are two whorls of tentacles, the outer ring of about thirty are long and slender, while the inner ring, consisting of a similar number, are short and are extended upward, turning inward at the tip to form a cone; it is this feature which distinguishes this species from the otherwise similar Cerianthus lloydii. The tentacles are indistinctly banded. It lives in soft sand, muddy sand, mud or gravel, with its column concealed in a parchment-like tube.

== Distribution ==
This species was described from Trondheim Fjord, Norway. It occurs in the north-east Atlantic Ocean off Scotland and Ireland. In Northern Ireland it is known only from the southern half of Rathlin Island. It seems to be rare in Northern Ireland, but this may be because it is at least partly nocturnal and may have been overlooked.
