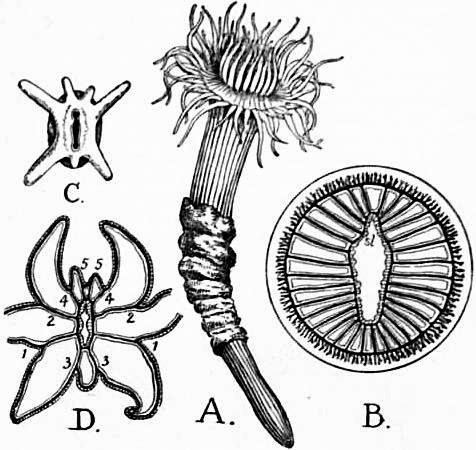

Conservation status
- Data Deficient (IUCN 3.1) (Mediterranean)

Scientific classification
- Kingdom: Animalia
- Phylum: Cnidaria
- Subphylum: Anthozoa
- Class: Hexacorallia
- Order: Ceriantharia
- Family: Cerianthidae
- Genus: Pachycerianthus
- Species: P. solitarius

Binomial name
- Pachycerianthus solitarius (Rapp, 1829)

= Pachycerianthus solitarius =

Species of sea anemone

Pachycerianthus solitarius is a species of tube-dwelling anemone in the genus Pachycerianthus. The species has been observed in the Mediterranean Sea, off the coast of Italy.
