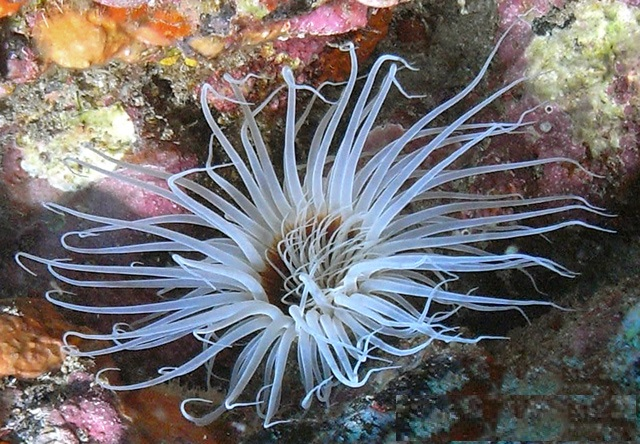

Conservation status
- Data Deficient (IUCN 3.1)

Scientific classification
- Kingdom: Animalia
- Phylum: Cnidaria
- Subphylum: Anthozoa
- Class: Hexacorallia
- Order: Ceriantharia
- Family: Cerianthidae
- Genus: Pachycerianthus
- Species: P. dohrni

Binomial name
- Pachycerianthus dohrni (Van Beneden, 1923)

= Pachycerianthus dohrni =

Species of sea anemone

Pachycerianthus dohrni, commonly known as the sea daisy, is a species of tube-dwelling anemone in the genus Pachycerianthus. The species is endemic to the Mediterranean Sea.
