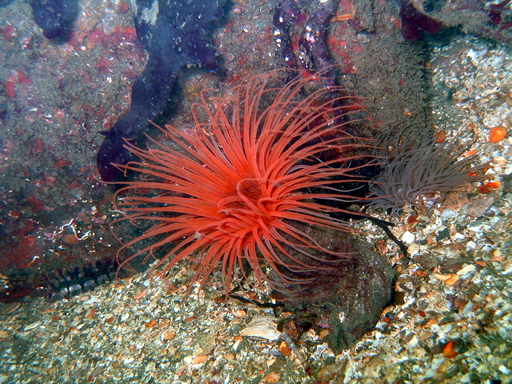
- At Monterey Bay, CA, USA.

Scientific classification
- Kingdom: Animalia
- Phylum: Cnidaria
- Subphylum: Anthozoa
- Class: Hexacorallia
- Order: Ceriantharia
- Family: Cerianthidae
- Genus: Pachycerianthus
- Species: P. fimbriatus

Binomial name
- Pachycerianthus fimbriatus McMurrich, 1910

Synonyms
- Cerianthus elongatus Kwietniewski, 1898; Pachycerianthus plicatus Carlgren, 1924

= Pachycerianthus fimbriatus =

Species of sea anemone

Pachycerianthus fimbriatus is a cerianthid anemone that burrows in substrate and lives in a semi-rigid tube made of felted nematocysts. The anemone is often seen in bright orange to red.

Like most anemones, the tube-dwelling anemone contains stinging cells or nematocytes along its tentacles, however, the cells are not toxic to humans.

The ceriantharia possess two whorls of tentacles, one surrounding the mouth (labial tentacles) and one at the edge of the oral disc (marginal tentacles).

== Distribution ==
This species was described from Indonesia. It is considered to be synonymous with Pachycerianthus plicatus which was described from the Pacific Ocean coast of North America.

== Biology ==
Pachycerianthus fimbriatus feeds on small crustaceans. The giant nudibranch Dendronotus iris has been documented to prey upon P. fimbriatus.
