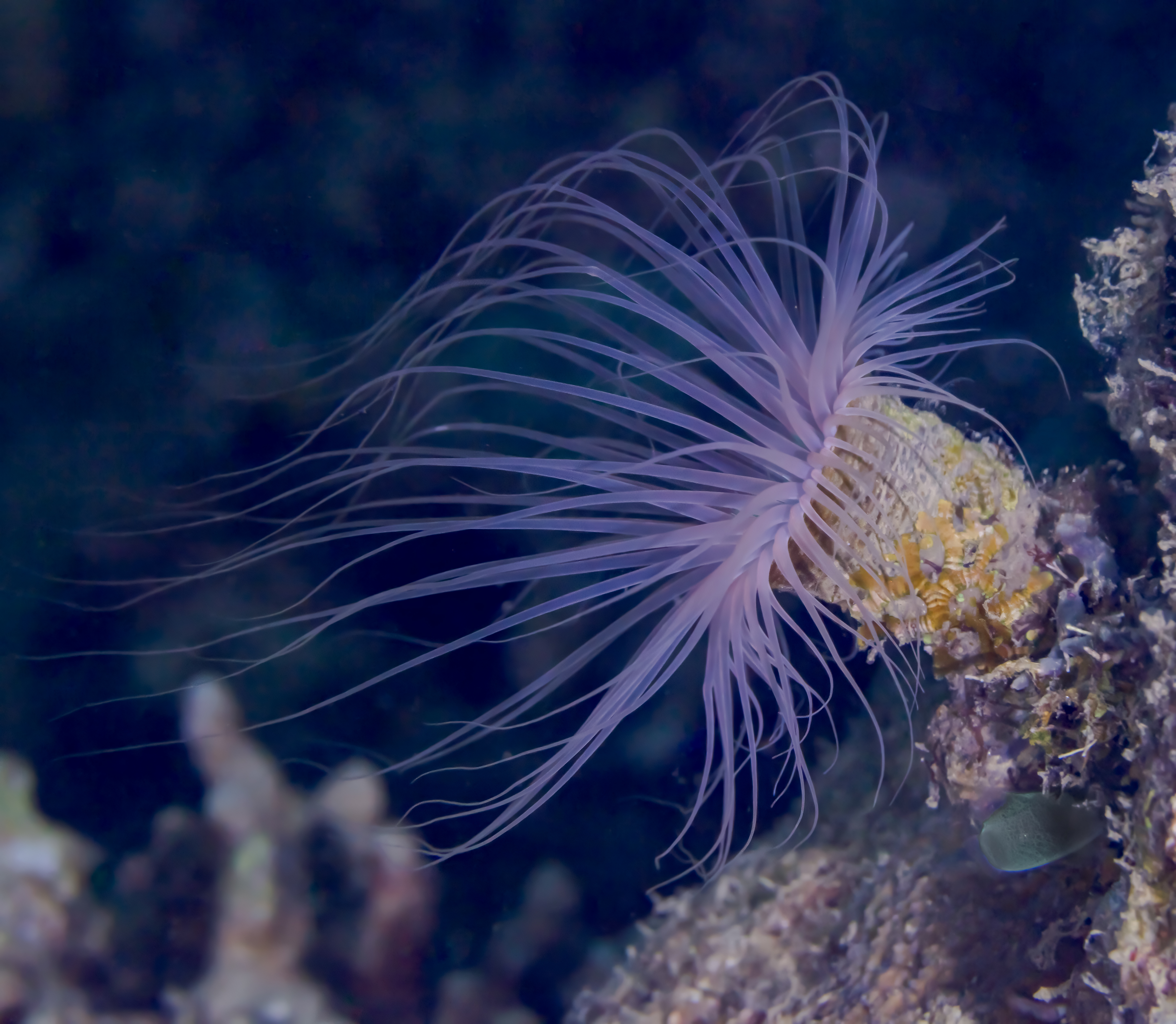

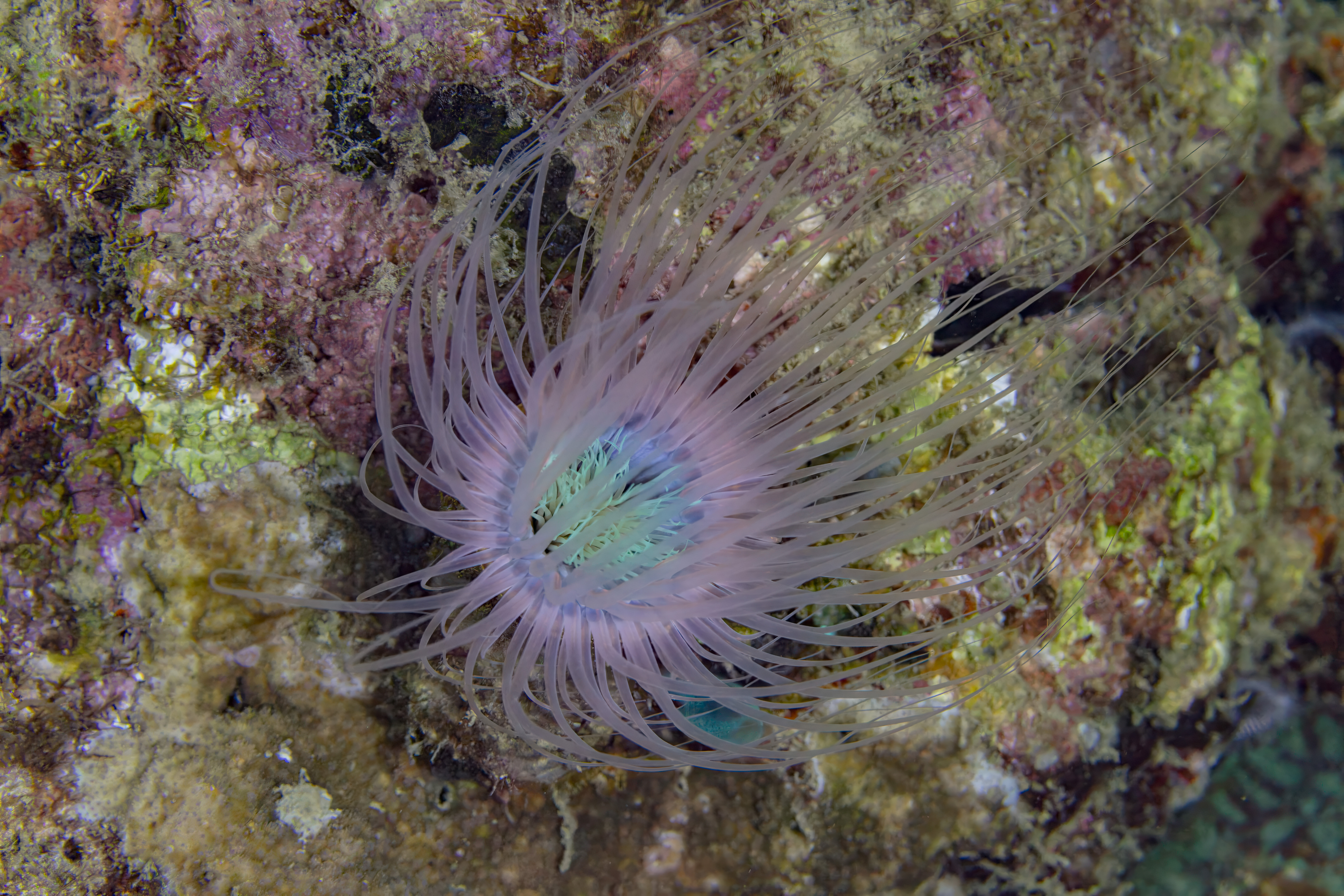

Scientific classification
- Domain: Eukaryota
- Kingdom: Animalia
- Phylum: Cnidaria
- Subphylum: Anthozoa
- Class: Hexacorallia
- Order: Ceriantharia
- Family: Cerianthidae
- Genus: Pachycerianthus
- Species: P. delwynae

Binomial name
- Pachycerianthus delwynae Carter, 1995

= Pachycerianthus delwynae =

Species of sea anemone

Pachycerianthus delwynae is a species of tube-dwelling anemone in the genus Pachycerianthus. The species can be found in the Pacific Ocean, off the coast of New Caledonia.
