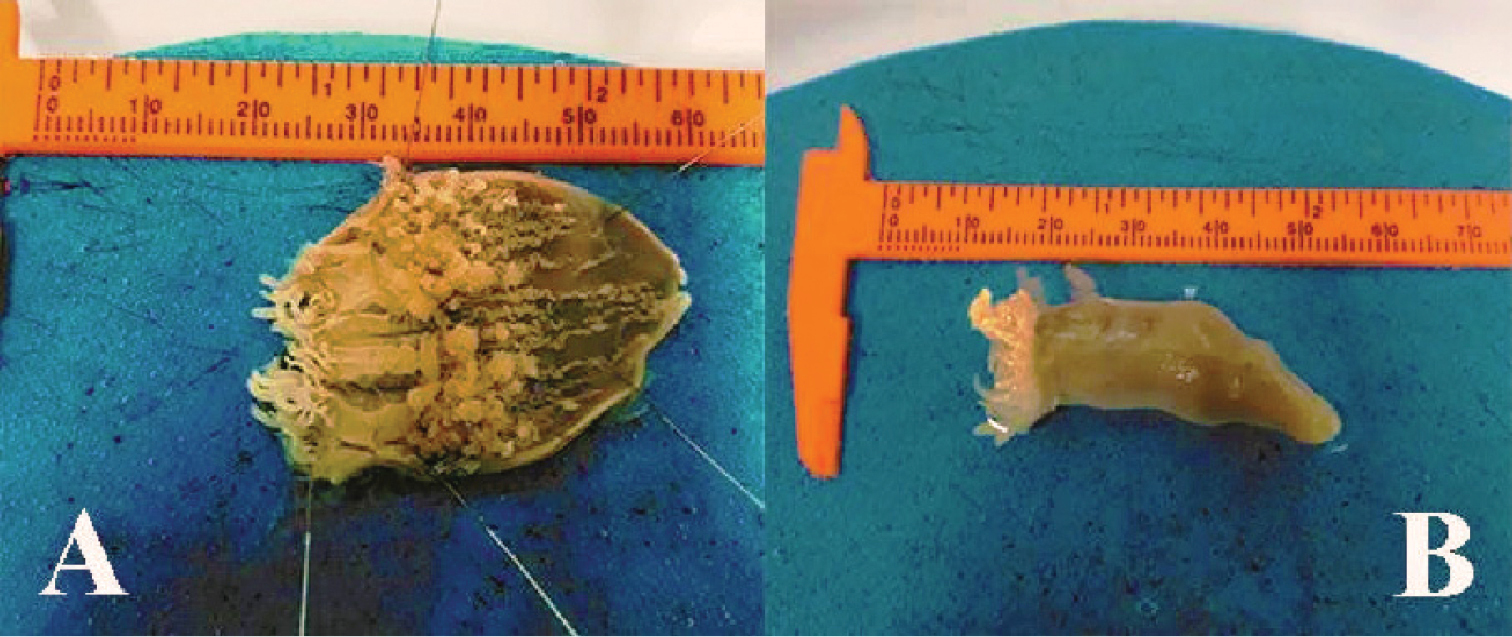

Scientific classification
- Kingdom: Animalia
- Phylum: Cnidaria
- Subphylum: Anthozoa
- Class: Hexacorallia
- Order: Ceriantharia
- Family: Cerianthidae
- Genus: Ceriantheomorphe
- Species: C. ambonensis

Binomial name
- Ceriantheomorphe ambonensis (Kwietniewski, 1898)

= Ceriantheomorphe ambonensis =

Species of sea anemone

Ceriantheomorphe brasiliensis is a species of tube-dwelling anemones in the family Cerianthidae. Very little is known about the species.
