= Anactinia =

Anactinia may refer to:

- Anactinia (cnidarian), a genus of cnidarians in the family Arachnactidae
- Anactinia, a genus of plants in the family Asteraceae; synonym of Nardophyllum
