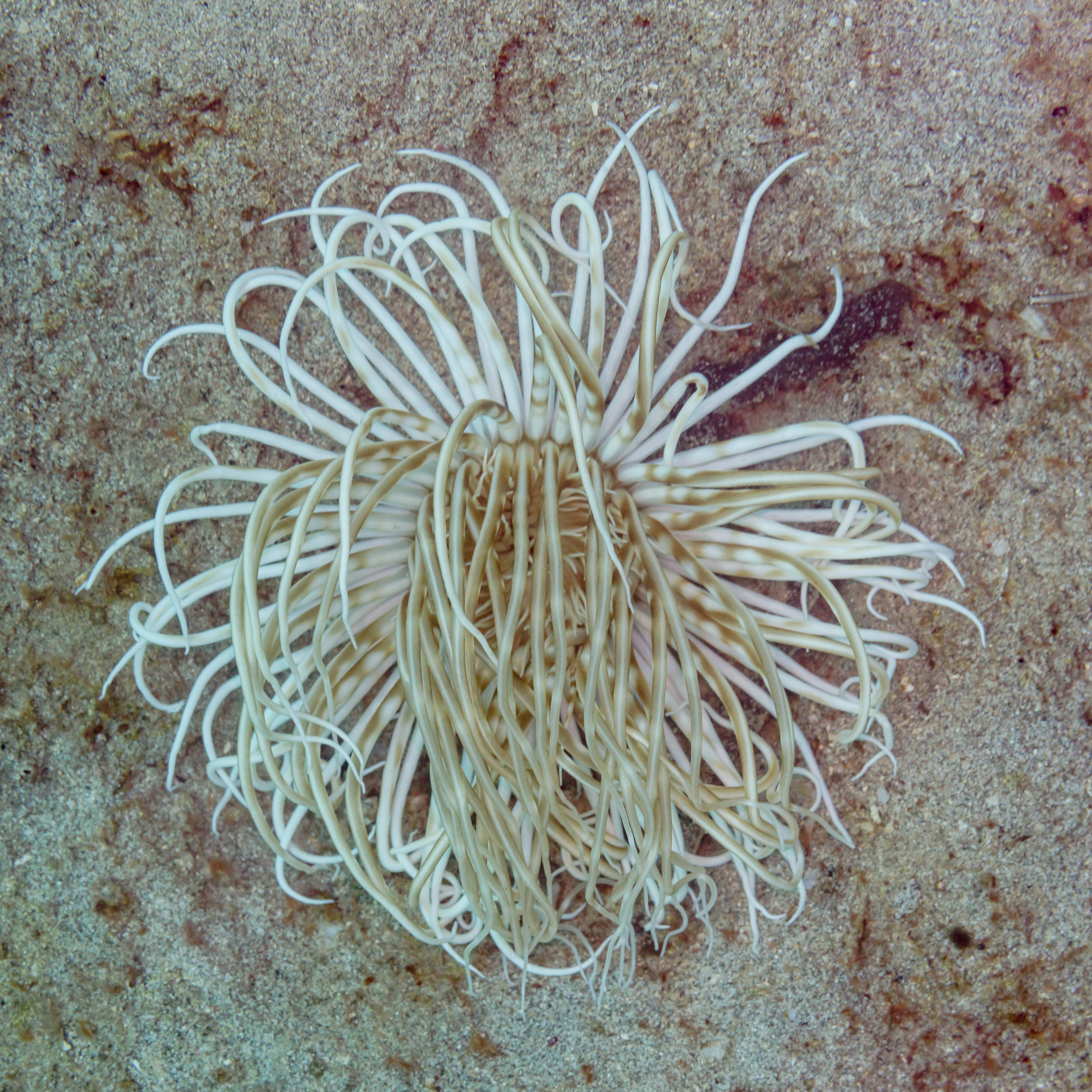

Scientific classification
- Kingdom: Animalia
- Phylum: Cnidaria
- Subphylum: Anthozoa
- Class: Hexacorallia
- Order: Ceriantharia
- Family: Cerianthidae
- Genus: Cerianthus
- Species: C. punctatus

Binomial name
- Cerianthus punctatus Uchida, 1979

= Cerianthus punctatus =

Species of sea anemone

Cerianthus lloydii is a species of tube-dwelling sea anemone in the family Cerianthidae. The species can be found off the coast of the Chūbu region of Japan.
