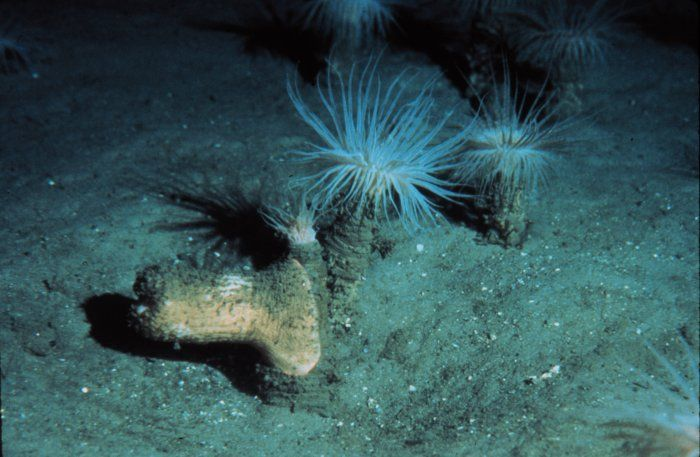

Scientific classification
- Kingdom: Animalia
- Phylum: Cnidaria
- Subphylum: Anthozoa
- Class: Hexacorallia
- Order: Ceriantharia
- Family: Cerianthidae
- Genus: Pachycerianthus
- Species: P. borealis

Binomial name
- Pachycerianthus borealis (Verrill, 1873)

= Pachycerianthus borealis =

Species of sea anemone

Pachycerianthus borealis is a species of tube-dwelling anemone in the genus Pachycerianthus. The species is endemic to the Atlantic Ocean.

Pachycerianthus borealis is distributed around the northern hemisphere, and is typically located around the Black Sea.
