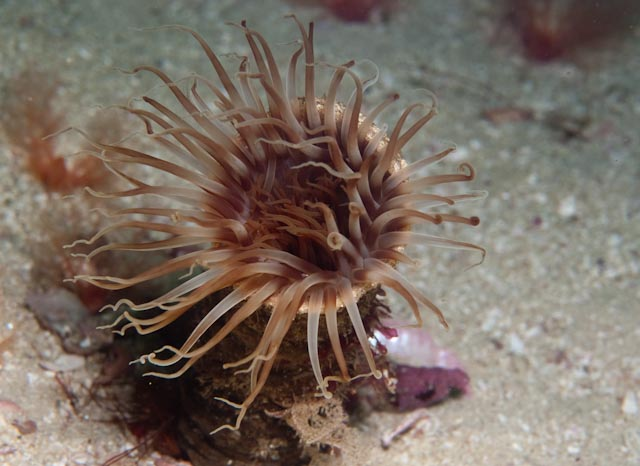

Scientific classification
- Kingdom: Animalia
- Phylum: Cnidaria
- Subphylum: Anthozoa
- Class: Hexacorallia
- Order: Ceriantharia
- Family: Cerianthidae
- Genus: Ceriantheopsis
- Species: C. austroafricanus

Binomial name
- Ceriantheopsis austroafricanus Molodtsova, Griffiths & Acuna, 2012

= Burrowing anemone =

Species of sea anemone

The burrowing anemone (Ceriantheopsis austroafricanus) is a species of tube-dwelling anemone in the family Cerianthidae.

== Description ==
The burrowing anemone grows up to 8 cm in diameter. It lives in a self-constructed wrinkled felt-like tube which may be buried quite deeply in the sand. Several rows of feeding tentacles emerge from the tube and may be salmon-coloured, brownish, creamy or purple. The outer tentacles are longer and used for food capture and defense. The inner tentacles are shorter and held more erect. These are used for food manipulation and ingestion. Burrowing anemones only emerge to feed or reproduce, and they are nocturnal in their feeding habits.

== Distribution ==
The burrowing anemone has been found in Table Bay and False Bay around the Cape Peninsula and Hermanus on the south coast of South Africa, and lives from the subtidal zone down to at least 25m under water.

== Ecology ==
This anemone is found in sandy and silty areas.
