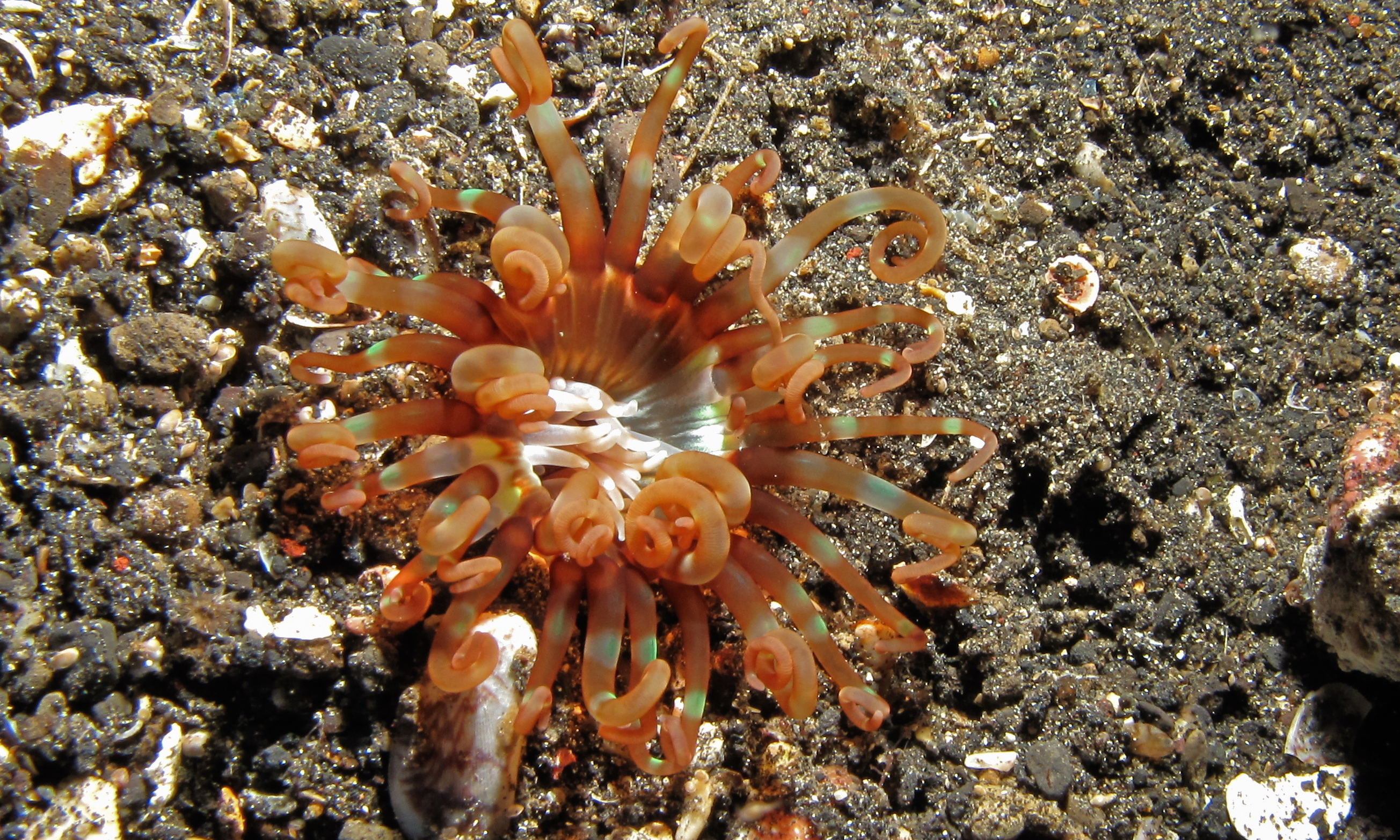
- A Pachycerianthus maua specimen

Scientific classification
- Domain: Eukaryota
- Kingdom: Animalia
- Phylum: Cnidaria
- Subphylum: Anthozoa
- Class: Hexacorallia
- Order: Ceriantharia
- Family: Cerianthidae
- Genus: Pachycerianthus
- Species: P. maua

Binomial name
- Pachycerianthus maua (Carlgren, 1900)

= Pachycerianthus maua =

Species of sea anemone

Pachycerianthus maua, known informally as the banded tube anemone, is a species of tube-dwelling anemone in the genus Pachycerianthus. The species is distinctive by multi-color bands that are located on its tentacle arms, and the species has been observed in Asia and off the coast of Madagascar.
