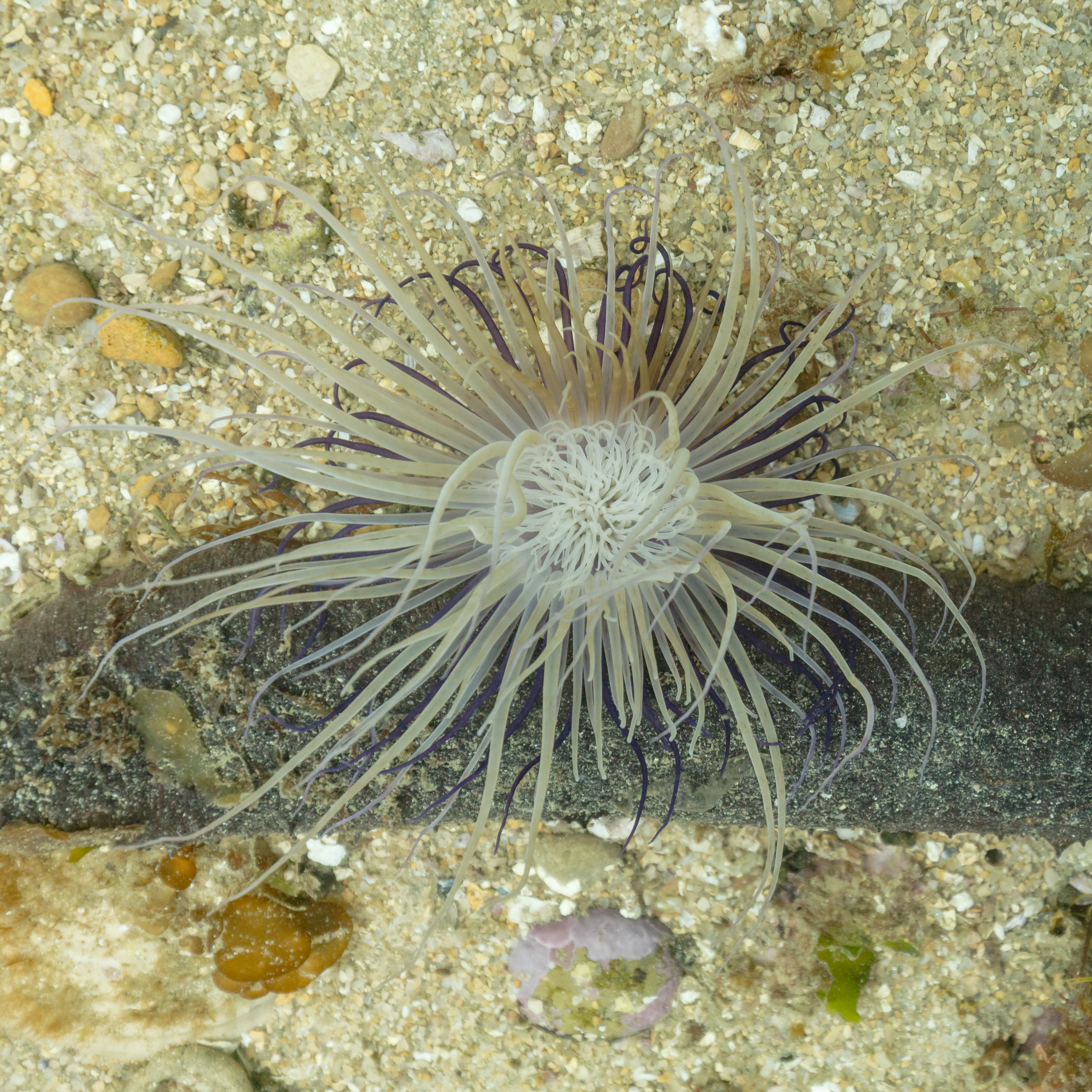

Conservation status
- Least Concern (IUCN 3.1) (Mediterranean)

Scientific classification
- Kingdom: Animalia
- Phylum: Cnidaria
- Subphylum: Anthozoa
- Class: Hexacorallia
- Order: Ceriantharia
- Family: Cerianthidae
- Genus: Cerianthus
- Species: C. membranaceus

Binomial name
- Cerianthus membranaceus (Gmelin, 1791)

Synonyms
- List: Actinia elongata Grube, 1840; Actinia cylindrica Renier, 1807; Actinia vestita Renier, 1807; Cereus cupreus Ilmoni, 1830; Cerianthus actinioideus Delle Chiaje, 1841; Cerianthus cornucopia Delle Chiaje, 1841; Cerianthus cylindricus (Renier, 1807); Cerianthus membraneux; Cerianthus nans Andres, 1881; Cerianthus vestitus (Renier, 1807); Moschata rhododactyla Renier in de Blainville, 1830; Saccanthus purpurescens Milne Edwards, 1857; Tubularia membranacea Gmelin, 1791

= Cerianthus membranaceus =

Species of sea anemone

Cerianthus membranaceus, the cylinder anemone or coloured tube anemone, is a species of large, tube-dwelling anemone in the family Cerianthidae. It is native to the Mediterranean Sea and adjoining parts of the northeastern Atlantic Ocean.

== Description ==
Cerianthus membranaceus is a large, tube-dwelling anemone. The oral disc can have a diameter of up to 40 cm (16 in). There are two whorls of tentacles, amounting to about two hundred tentacles in all. Those in the outer whorl are long and slender and armed with cnidocytes (stinging cells) and are used for catching prey. Tentacles in the inner whorl are shorter and function to transfer captured food to the central mouth. The tentacles are sometimes banded and come in an array of colours; white, yellow, orange, green, brown, blue, black, purple and violet. The colour of the inner whorl often contrasts with that of the outer whorl.

The column of this tube anemone secretes mucus in which is embedded a unique type of cnidocytes that mesh together to form a fibrous structure. Sand and other particles adhere to this and it forms a leathery, protective tube up to 40 cm (16 in) in length. There is no pedal attachment and the lower end of the tube is buried in the soft substrate. The tube is open at the base which allows for escape of water when the animal retreats into the tube.

== Distribution and habitat ==
Cerianthus membranaceus is found on the seabed in shallow water in the Mediterranean Sea, the northern Adriatic Sea and the northeastern Atlantic Ocean, its range extending as far north as Britain. It occurs on sandy or silty substrates where its tube is buried vertically in the sediment. In the Mediterranean, it principally occurs in areas with high levels of organic matter, such as in zones of pollution off Marseille, where it is present at high densities throughout the year.

== Ecology ==
The tentacles of Cerianthus membranaceus do not retract, but the whole animal can retreat into its tube. As it does so, some of the tentacles grip the rim and pull the tube closed behind it, effectively making it disappear from view. The tube is normally a permanent home, but if the anemone is disturbed from below, as by a burrowing sea urchin, it can eject itself from its tube, move to a new location and secrete a new tube.

Cerianthus membranaceus feeds on small fish and planktonic organisms which it catches with its tentacles. It is a protandrous hermaphrodite, starting life as a male and becoming a female later. The gametes are liberated into the sea and after fertilisation, the developing larvae drift with the plankton for a long time before settling on the seabed and undergoing metamorphosis into juvenile polyps.

The tube is used as a refuge by many commensal organisms, especially polychaete worms and shrimps. The horseshoe worm, Phoronis australis, often attaches itself to the outside of the tube. There may be twenty to fifty horseshoe worms associated with one tube anemone.

The lifespan of C. membranaceus in the wild is not known, but some individuals have been occupants of a tank in Naples Aquarium for more than fifty years.
