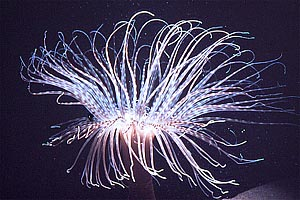

Scientific classification
- Kingdom: Animalia
- Phylum: Cnidaria
- Subphylum: Anthozoa
- Class: Hexacorallia
- Order: Ceriantharia
- Family: Cerianthidae
- Genus: Cerianthus
- Species: C. filiformis

Binomial name
- Cerianthus filiformis (Carlgren, 1924)

= Cerianthus filiformis =

Species of sea anemone

Cerianthus filiformis is a species of tube-dwelling sea anemone in the family Cerianthidae. It is found throughout the tropical waters of the western Indo-Pacific Ocean.

== Description ==
C. filiformis resembles the sea anemone and has a stretched and muscularised body which can reach 35 cm. Its body has the shape of a large polyp with numerous mobile tentacles. The tint of the tentacles is variously white, green, orange or purple and the central tentacles may have a different coloration from the marginal tentacles.

== Distribution and habitat ==
C. filiformis is widespread throughout the tropical waters of the western Indo-Pacific Ocean. Tube dwelling anemones such as C. filiformis live in a mucous tube that they secrete in soft sand or sediment, unlike more typical anemones whose muscular foot holds on to rock or coral.

== Behaviour and ecology ==
C. filiformis feeds on all the small-sized and edible drifting food which pass within the reach of its tentacles. It protects itself from predators by retracting back into the tube, which can reach up to 100 cm in length. The animal shows only its tentacles to feed, usually at night time. The animal can withdraw into the tube for resting or if threatened.
