= Anthoactis =

Scientific classification
- Domain: Eukaryota
- Kingdom: Animalia
- Phylum: Cnidaria
- Subclass: Ceriantharia
- Order: Spirularia
- Family: Cerianthidae
- Genus: Anthoactis; Leloup, 1932

Genus of sea anemones

Anthoactis is a genus of cnidarians belonging to the family Cerianthidae.

The species of this genus are found in Europe.

Species:

- Anthoactis armauerhanseni Leloup, 1932
- Anthoactis australiae Carlgren, 1937
- Anthoactis benedeni Leloup, 1932
