= Apiactis =

Scientific classification
- Domain: Eukaryota
- Kingdom: Animalia
- Phylum: Cnidaria
- Subclass: Ceriantharia
- Order: Spirularia
- Family: Cerianthidae
- Genus: Apiactis; Beneden, 1897

Genus of sea anemones

Apiactis is a genus of cnidarians belonging to the family Cerianthidae.

Species:

- Apiactis bengalensis Panikkar, 1936
- Apiactis denticulata Beneden, 1897
- Apiactis tentaculata Leloup, 1942
