= Tegnue =

Rock formations in the Adriatic Sea

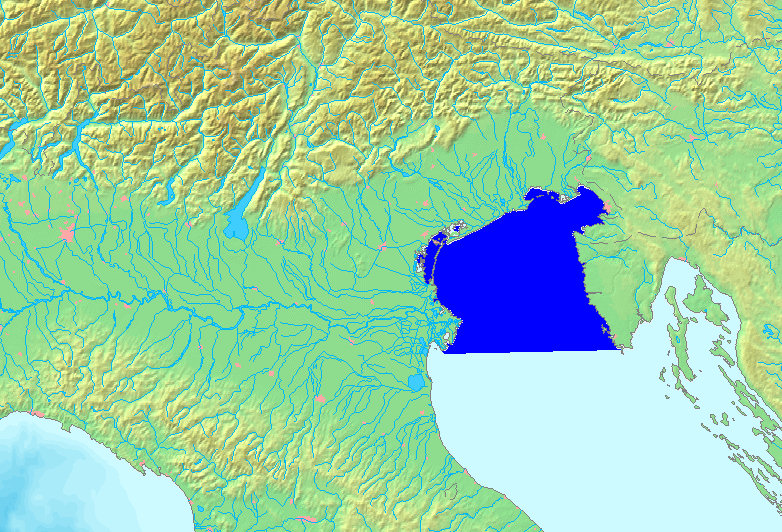

Tegnue (singular tegnua) are rock formations which have developed on the sea bottom of the Gulf of Venice, in the northern Adriatic Sea. They are bio-sediments which are very similar to coral reefs and for this reason they also are called Adriatic coral reefs. They are found especially off the coasts of Caorle, the Cavallino peninsula, the Lido di Venezia island and the Sottomarina peninsula at Chioggia. There are eight such formations. They are at a depth of -15/-40 m. The largest formation is off the coast of the Cavallino peninsula.

== Etymology ==
Tegnùe is a Venetian dialect word which means "held" or "held back." The name was given by fishermen whose nets got caught in these rocks at the bottom of the sea, which held them back.

== History ==
The presence of areas where the normally sandy and muddy sea floor of the Adriatic becomes suddenly rocky and uneven, potentially snagging and damaging nets, has been known to fishermen around the Gulf of Venice for centuries. These areas were typically avoided, but some fishermen sought them out due to the better fishing found around them and consequently attempted to keep the precise location of these reefs secret. By the 18th century, a common belief had emerged that the tegnùe were the ruins of cities that had sunk underwater during an ancient flood.

=== Research and mapping out ===
ARPAV, the Agenzia Regionale per la Prevenzione a Protezione Ambientale del Veneto (Veneto Regional Agency for Environmental Prevention and Protection) carried out three research projects which were part of international, national and local programmes between 2003 and 2007. The first was a collaboration between the Veneto and the Friuli-Venezia Giulia regions and Slovenia for a regional oversight project called “Development of studies monitoring activities of the evolution of the sea coast ecosystem aimed at safeguard, integrated management and enhancement of the resources of the sea.” The second was part of the 6th three-year national plan for Fishing and Aquaculture called “The tegnue: studies of some areas of particular environmental interest for the enhancement of local halieutic resources and nature safeguard.” The third was part of an “Interventions for the safeguard and enhancement of a repopulation sea oasis called Porto Falconara Tegnua” project which was part of a plan for the Caorle area.

The aims of the projects were to establish the Upper Adriatic Observatory as a regional hub, to coordinate the activities of local authorities, organisations and research institutes, to provide technical, scientific and service support for the regional policies regarding the improvement and safeguard of the quality of the coastal sea waters, to establish a Veneto sea databank, to establish monitoring of pollution, to enhance and support sustainable tourist activities, to safeguard and enhance areas of natural interest, to promote and disseminate information for an environmental education culture, and to study some areas of particular environmental interest for the enhancement of local fishing resources and the safeguard of nature.

ARPAV carried out geomorphologic and granulometric, structural, mineralogical and biological research. The results were published by ARPAV in conjunction with the Natural History Museum of Venice in 2010 with the title “The Upper Adriatic tegnue: enhancement of marine resources through the study of areas of environmental value”. The printed edition is out of print, but it can be downloaded from the ARPAV website.

Eight tegnue have been mapped out off the Veneto shore of the Gulf of Venice:

- 1. Caorle - It has a rectangular shape, it is 2,2 km long and 3.5 km wide, its area is 7.7 square km and it lies c. 2–3 km form the coast At a depth of -8 to -12 m (Note: When two values are given for the offshore distance of the tegnue is because the mentioned ARPAV document gives different values for them in two different pages, p. 15 and pp. 29-30)
- 2. D’Ancona – It has a rectangular shape, it is 3,4 km long and 2.0 km wide, its area is 6.9 square km and it lies c. 7.7–9 km form the coast, at a depth of -16 to -21 m
- 3. Malamocco – It has a rectangular shape, it is 3,4 km long and 2.0 km wide, its area is 6.8 square km and it lies c. 1.7 km form the coast at a depth of -8 to -11 m
- 4. Sorse – It has a rectangular shape, it is 3,42 km long and 2.1 km wide, its area is 7.2 square km and it lies c. 17.6-19.6 km form the coast at a depth of -19 to -24 m
- 5. Venezia – It has a rectangular shape, it is 3,35 km long and 2.1 km wide, its area is 7 square km and it lies c. 10.9-16.4 km form the coast at a depth of -18 to -21 m
- 6. Cavallino Vicina – It has a rectangular shape, it is 3,45 km long and 2.12 km wide, its area is 7.3 square km and it lies c. 3.3-4.5 km form the coast at a depth of -14 to -17 m
- 7. Cavallino Lontana – It has a rectangular shape, it is 1.6 km long and 850 m wide, its area is 1.4 square km and it lies c. 10 km form the coast at a depth of -16 to -23 m
- 8. Chioggia – It has a rectangular shape, it is 3.4 km long and 2.1 km wide, its area is 7.1 square km and it lies c. 10 km form the coast (Note: No data for the depth range of this formation was given)

The Caorle tegnua is off the shore of Caorle. The Cavallino Vicina, D’Ancona, Cavallino Lontana and Sorse tegnue are off the shore of Cavallino peninsula. The Malamocco and Venezia are off the shore of the Lido di Venezia island. The Chioggia tegnua is off the shore of Sottomarina peninsula, Chioggia.

== Morphology ==
The sizes of the tegnue can be very different, from a few to several thousands of square metres, with elevations from the bottom form a few tens of centimetres in the low formations, sometimes called "lastrure" (slab formations) and a few metres in the higher ones, which are often found at greater depths. There are three types of formations:

- Clastic sedimentary rocks formed by the hardening of sediments (sands) or organogenic debris (probably linked to variations in sea level in geologically recent epochs) called “beachrocks.” They look like sub-horizontal slabs protruding from the bottom with very variable thickness and usually a very slight inclination, which causes an easy submersion by sediments, whereas the prevalence of the erosive action of the sea currents can cause new structures to surface or the formation of depressions and cavities along the perimeter areas.
- Sedimentary rocks from chemical deposition whose origin is linked to the rise of methane gas from the sea bottom and its reaction with sea water which activates a process which can cause the precipitation of carbonates and the hardening of sediments. Subsequent erosive action causes the rising of the structures.
- Organogenic rocks, structures produced by the action of constructor organisms, vegetable and animal, whose calcareous skeleton stratifies and can form structures with a moderate thickness. Such a formation process leads to varied and irregular morphologies; micro and macro cavities caused by different speeds and irregularities in the growth of the various constructor organisms. They are carbonate rocks formed by marine organisms superimposed on hard substrates which had previously formed though the consolidation of sands. They are reefs which are different from tropical reefs in that the main bio-constructor organism is not coral, but Corallinaceae, red calcareous algae, bryozoa (filter feeders), Serpulidae (annelid worms) and encrusted Cnidaria. The hardening of the sand incorporated calcareous shells of molluscs which stratified to form a certain thickness.

Often the different typologies coexist. In various cases the organogenic formations can develop on top of structures of sedimentary nature, covering them with layers of variable thickness in the same way in which they can colonise artificial substrates of human origin.

The importance of the vegetable part in organopgenic construction over the animal ones is highly variable and subject to water brightness factors; that is, linked to the depth and turbidity of the waters. The morphology is very irregular. There are surfaces very rich in micro crevices and have high diversity. They are often called reefs, but compared to tropical sea coral reefs, which are derived from the action of hermatype organisms (reef-building coral) which need hot and clear water, the tegnue, given the turbidity of the local water, do not substantially depend on photosynthesis processes at a benthos level. They lie in highly turbid waters due to a high quantity of suspended material of fluvial origin which reduces brightness of the bottom. However, this is also a rich source of nutrients for filter feeders and detritivores (which obtain nutrients by consuming detritus, decomposing plant and animal parts and faeces) which constitute the dominant element of the tegnue population.

Many reefs, particularly the larger ones, are surrounded by a course belt of debris with variable sizes, up to several metres, accumulated by the currents and characterised by populations which mainly pertains to coastal debris. It cannot be ruled out that the reefs can even be derived from bioconcentration phenomena activated on large accumulations of debris deposited in the gaps between fossil dunes, as it has been noted off the Cavallino peninsula coast, or caused by a particularly dense presence of Pinna nobilis (noble pen shell) populations in the past. In the reefs in this area there are structures of consolidated debris in small oranogenic patches scattered irregularly in a wide shell debris area. Various hundreds of Pinna nobilis were sticking out of the bottom for over 30/40 cm, causing an accumulation of coarse shell debris rich in encrusted organisms and widely colonised by venus clams (Venus verrucosa). Because of the uniqueness of these areas, after their discovery there was intense fishing with turboblowers which probably had strong negative impact.

== Research on the origins of the tegnue ==
The Istituto di Science Marine (Marine Science Institute) of the CNR, the Consiglio Nazionale delle Ricerce (National Research Council), coordinated a research on origins of the tegnue in conjunction with the University of Padua, OIGS, Istituto nazionale di oceanografia e di geofisica sperimentale (National Institute of Experimental Oceanography and Geophysics), ISPRA Istituto superiore per la protezione e la ricerca ambientale (Higher Institute for Environmental Protection and Research) and the Argentinian CONICET, Consejo Nacional de investigaciones científicas y técnicas (National Council of Scientific and Technical Investigation). The results were published as an article called "Paleochannel and beach-bar palimpsest topography as initial substrate for coralligenous buildups offshore Venice, Italy" in 2017.

Venezia Today provided a brief coverage of the report. These coralline formations are an anomaly compared to the dendritic bottom of sand and loam on which they rest. To improve the understanding of these formations researchers carried out more than 200 dives to map the morphology and bathymetry of the sea bottom on which they rest, took samples of loose rocks and sediments and placed wells to analyse the water in the depths of the sea. Previous genetic models were not satisfactory, so the samples were analysed in a laboratory. This has shown that the tegnue developed along elongated morphological structures of ancient fluvial channels present in the plain of the bottom of the sea which was above water during the last glacial period some 20,000 years ago. The sediments have been dated to 9,000 years ago and their hardening on which the first organisms became attached occurred 7,000 years ago.

== Ecology ==
The Gulf of Venice has a very high area/water volume relationship due to its shallowness; the sea bottom rarely reaches a depth beyond -30 m. This decreases the greater heating of seas relative to the atmosphere's climate pattern. Its morphology tends to slow down the speed of water turnover. These factors coupled with being at the highest latitude of the Mediterranean Sea and the input of or high volumes of relatively cold freshwater from the rivers from the Alps create a peculiar climate pattern which switches from warm temperate/subtropical in the summer to cold/subpolar ones in the winter. Fluvial freshwater diseases salinity and also brings in sediments and nutrients form the mainland. All of this has a selective action on the marine species which populate it. As a result, in the Upper Adriatic Sea there is an absence of some typically Mediterranean species. This is called the “Upper Adriatic lacuna.” There are, instead, species typical of more northern areas with Atlantic-boreal affinities such as Fucus virsoides brown algae and Littorina saxatilis sea snails. This gives the Gulf of Venice ecologic characteristics similar to the sub-Atlantic zone.

Being scattered and at varied depths and environmentally, morphologically and structurally heterogeneous, the tegnue develop diversified populations both in the different sites and within the same Biotypes in a mosaic of microenvironments which makes the comparison of their populations difficult. The mentioned environmental peculiarity of the Gulf of Venice contributes to make the populations of these ridges peculiar; similar but not juxtaposed with the other populations of the Mediterranean Sea.

These "islands" of solid substrate in the homogeneous expanse of the sand/mud of the sea bottoms create, locally, areas rich in microenvironments which favour an increase in the diversity of organism populations which need adherence to a solid surface and can settle in such substrates and the areas around them. Their location in not excessively deep and eutrophic waters favour an increase in biomass and the number of species thanks to the support and the protection offered by the solid substrates together with their vertical gradient given by their sticking up from the bottom and the enormous food availability in the form of already sedimented suspended organic material.

Oases with extreme biologic richness with an increase in the number of species and also a considerable biomass per surface unit are thus formed. These areas are also extremely favourable for egg deposition, ogive-shaped capsules, larvae or reproductive forms which need a solid anchorage. The numerous cavities and crevices and the richness and diversity of the available food spectrum favour the development of juvenile forms of numerous species, reducing mortality.

The equilibrium within such complex biocoenosis is determined by interactions between environmental and biological factors whose variations can modify the equilibria which define it. The tegnue seem to also create a marked diversification of populations within themselves due to the abundance of microenvironments and ridges and their distribution from the low-depth coastal areas more directly influenced by continental fluvial inputs to more offshore ones under greater water pressure in a high sedimentation and low brightness regime.

== Fauna ==
There are Porifera (sponge) species, including Suberites carnosus, both encrusted and digitate (with finger-like lobes), Suberites domuncula, which in these environments can easily find hermit crabs (Pagurus), with which they are symbiotic, Chondrosia reniformis (a demosponge), which often has digitations in its irregularities, Aplysina aerophoba, Ircinia variabilis and Dysideidae sea sponges, which can form dense schools. There are several species of Cliona genus of demisponges, the most of which common are Cliona viridis, Raspaciona aculeata, Raspailia typica, Geodia cydonium and Tethya citrina.

There are Cnidaria (a phylum of more than 9,000 species that includes the corals, hydras, jellyfish, sea anemones, sea pens, sea whips, and sea fans) with dense colonies of Hydrozoa, several species of sea anemones, large specimens of Cerianthus membranaceus (cylinder anemones), which are often found in mobile substrates close to the solid structures, ringed worms (annelids), among which there are very numerous Serpulidae which often cover any available surface piling on top of each other forming layers. Echinoderms have numerous species which are typically found in the biocoenosis of the tegnue, with sea cucumbers (Holothuroidea) such as Ocnus planci and Holothuria polii, starfish (Asteroidea), brittle stars (ophiuroids) with Ophiothrix fragilis populations, which are at times very dense, and sea urchins (Echinoidea) such as Paracentrotus lividus, Gracilechinus acutus and Sphaerechinus granularis.

The Bryozoa (moss animals) colonies, both encrusted and erected, such as the molluscs Arca noae (Noah's Ark shells), Mimachlamys varia (a genus of scallops) and queen scallops (Aequipecten opercularis), are very dense and are often epibiont (live on the surface of another organisms). Among the many molluscs there are the sea snails Diodora graeca (Greek keyhole limpet) Diodora italica (Italian keyhole limpet) and Bolma rugosa. There are numerous species of nudibranchs (soft-bodied, marine gastropod molluscs), which are often tied trophically to a sole species of sponges or hydrozoa (very small, predatory animals), as well as the big bivalvia such as fan mussels (Pinna nobilis) and pen shells (Atrina pectinata), which are still common in the inner or proximal areas of the mobile substrates. There are many species of Tunicates among which there are the big and colourful colonies of Aplidium conicum, the camouflaged Microcosmus vulgaris, Ascidia mentula, Polycitor adriaticus and the small ascidiacea (sea squirts filter feeders) of the Didemnum genus.

The many species of fish include European congers (Conger conger), red scorpionfish (Scorpaena scrofa), brown meagres (Sciaena umbra), Mediterranean chromis (chromis chromis), brown combera (Serranus hepatus), shi drums (Umbrina cirrosa), poor cods (Trisopterus minutus), European basses (Dicentrarchus labrax), various species of Blenniidae (combtooth blennies) and European lobsters (Homarus gammarus). For some species, such as the European lobsters these are exclusive environments

== The tegnue under threat ==
The tegnùe have been adversely affected by pollution and local human activities. The Mediterranean Sea has become more and more polluted and the problem is worse in narrow basins and coastal areas more exposed from pollution for the land brought in by the waters of rivers. This is the case of the upper Adriatic, which is narrow and close to Italy's industrial heartland and its large intensive farming areas and where there is an extensive river network. On top of this there has been an increase in water turbidity in this basin. In the second half of the 20th century the last meadows of Posidonia oceanica, a Mediterranean seagrass, which were previously widespread, disappeared in the Gulf of Venice.

Locally the main sources of disruption are fishing and diving. Because of their nature, the tegnue were spared from trawling. However, in more recent times fishing with turboblowers and trawling with trawls with a protection chain at the bottom dragged by two high-power boasts enabled fishing ever closer and even above these reefs, causing considerable damage.

The greater knowledge about the tegnue provided by research led to an increase of divers in these areas without protection and surveillance measures. Previously not many people knew about them and they were hard to find. Diving became cheaper, safer and affordable to a larger number of people. GPS and sonars have made it easier to access the tegnue. The excessive number of recreational divers could cause considerable inadvertent damage.

Poaching by diving also had visible negative effects. There was a dramatic decrease in commercially valued species such as venus clams (Venus verrucose), which used to be numerous, through this kind of poaching. There was even greater damage to commercially sought-after species with a long growth period and late sexual maturity and their survival was threatened. One of the worse cases was that of the European lobster, which used to be characteristic in rocky formations and shipwrecks. They became confined to biotypes which were small, further offshore, did not protrude much form the bottom and were more difficult to reach and to find with sonars.

== Protected area ==
In 2002 the tegnue were declared and environmental protection area where fishing is banned. This was promoted by Chioggia's town council, research institutes and universities in the Veneto region, the Ministry of Agricultural and Forestry Policies, the Port of Venice Authority, fishermen associations and tourism operators. The Associazione Tegnue di Chioggia (Chioggia Tegnue Association) is contributing to the safeguard and enhancement of the tegnue.

== Tegnue Aquarium ==
A reconstruction of this habitat can be seen at the Natural History Museum of Venice. It is called Acquario delle Tegnùe (Tegnue Aquarium). This museum has released a short video clip about a majid crab in the aquarium. It has also published, in conjunction with ARPAV, the Regional Agency for of the Preservation and Protection of the Environment of the Veneto, a publication called Le Tegnue, Ambiente, Organismi e curiosità (The Tegnue, Environment, Organisms and Curiosities).

== See also ==
- Adriatic Sea
- Gulf of Venice
- Lagoon of Venice
- Reef

== Online resources ==
- ARPAV, Agenzia Regionale per la Prevenzione a Protezione Ambientale del Veneto (Veneto Regional Agency for Environmental Prevention and Protection) and Natural History Museum of Venice, Le-tegnue dellalto adriatico-valorizzazione della risorsa-marina attraverso lo studio-di aree-di pregio ambientale (The Tengue of the upper Adriatic - enhancement of marine resources through the study of areas of environmental value, ARPAV publications
- ARPAV, Agenzia Regionale per la Prevenzione a Protezione Ambientale del Veneto (Veneto Regional Agency for Environmental Prevention and Protection) and Natural History Museum of Venice, Le Tegnue, ambiente, Organismi e curiosità (Le Tegnue, Environment, Organisms and Curiosities).
- Tosi L., Zecchin M., Franchi F., Andrea Bergamasco A., Da Lio C., Baradello L., Mazzoli C., Montagna P., Taviani M., Tagliapietra D., Carol E., Franceschini G., Giovanardi O. & Donnici S., Paleochannel and beach-bar palimpsest topography as initial substrate for coralligenous buildups offshore Venice, Italy, Scientific Reports 7, Article number: 1321, 2 May 2017

A bibliography of academic articles about the tegnue can be found on the Website of the Associazione Tegnue di Chioggia - ONLUS (Chioggia Tegnue Association - ONLUS): "www.tegnue.it, Associazione Tegnue di Chioggia".
