= Bursanthus =

Scientific classification
- Domain: Eukaryota
- Kingdom: Animalia
- Phylum: Cnidaria
- Subclass: Ceriantharia
- Order: Spirularia
- Family: Cerianthidae
- Genus: Bursanthus; Leloup, 1968

Genus of sea anemones

Bursanthus is a genus of cnidarians belonging to the family Cerianthidae.

The species of this genus are found in Africa.

Species:

- Bursanthus bamfordi Leloup, 1968
