= Engodactylactis =

Scientific classification
- Domain: Eukaryota
- Kingdom: Animalia
- Phylum: Cnidaria
- Class: Hexacorallia
- Order: Ceriantharia
- Order: Spirularia
- Family: Cerianthidae
- Genus: Engodactylactis; Leloup, 1942

Genus of sea anemones

Engodactylactis is a genus of cnidarians belonging to the family Cerianthidae.

Species:

- Engodactylactis formosa (Gravier, 1920)
