= Botrucnidiata =

Scientific classification
- Domain: Eukaryota
- Kingdom: Animalia
- Phylum: Cnidaria
- Subclass: Ceriantharia
- Family: Botrucnidiferidae
- Genus: Botrucnidiata; Leloup, 1932

Genus of cnidarians

Botrucnidiata is a genus of cnidarians belonging to the family Botrucnidiferidae.

Species:

- Botrucnidiata damasi Leloup, 1932
