= Ceriantheomorphe =

Scientific classification
- Kingdom: Animalia
- Phylum: Cnidaria
- Subphylum: Anthozoa
- Class: Hexacorallia
- Order: Ceriantharia
- Family: Cerianthidae
- Genus: Ceriantheomorphe; Carlgren, 1931

Species
- See text

Genus of sea anemones

Ceriantheomorphe is a genus of tube-dwelling anemones in the family Cerianthidae.

== Species ==
The World Register of Marine Species includes the following species in the genus :

- Ceriantheomorphe ambonensis (Kwietniewski, 1898)
- Ceriantheomorphe brasiliensis Carlgren, 1931
