= Calpanthula =

Scientific classification
- Domain: Eukaryota
- Kingdom: Animalia
- Phylum: Cnidaria
- Subclass: Ceriantharia
- Family: Botrucnidiferidae
- Genus: Calpanthula; Van Beneden, 1897

Genus of cnidarians

Calpanthula is a genus of cnidarians belonging to the family Botrucnidiferidae.

Species:

- Calpanthula guinensis Van Beneden, 1897
