= Hensenanthula =

Scientific classification
- Domain: Eukaryota
- Kingdom: Animalia
- Phylum: Cnidaria
- Subphylum: Anthozoa
- Class: Hexacorallia
- Order: Ceriantharia
- Family: Botrucnidiferidae
- Genus: Hensenanthula van Beneden, 1897

Genus of cnidarians

Hensenanthula is a genus of cnidarians belonging to the family Botrucnidiferidae.

The species of this genus are found in Atlantic Ocean.

Species:

- Hensenanthula dactylifera Van Beneden, 1897
- Hensenanthula rotunda Leloup, 1964
