= Botrucnidiferidae =

Scientific classification
- Kingdom: Animalia
- Phylum: Cnidaria
- Subphylum: Anthozoa
- Class: Hexacorallia
- Order: Ceriantharia
- Suborder: Spirularia
- Family: Botrucnidiferidae

Family of cnidarians

Botrucnidiferidae is a family of cnidarians belonging to the order Spirularia.

== Genera ==
Genera:

  - Genus Angianthula Leloup, 1964
  - Genus Atractanthula Leloup, 1964
  - Genus Botruanthus McMurrich, 1910
  - Genus Botrucnidiata Leloup, 1932
  - Genus Botrucnidifer Carlgren, 1912
  - Genus Calpanthula van Beneden, 1897
  - Genus Cerianthula Beneden, 1898
  - Genus Gymnanthula Leloup, 1964
  - Genus Hensenanthula van Beneden, 1897
  - Genus Ovanthula van Beneden, 1897
  - Genus Sphaeranthula Leloup, 1955
