= Isodactylactis =

Scientific classification
- Domain: Eukaryota
- Kingdom: Animalia
- Phylum: Cnidaria
- Subphylum: Anthozoa
- Class: Hexacorallia
- Order: Ceriantharia
- Family: Cerianthidae
- Genus: Isodactylactis; Carlgren, 1924

Genus of sea anemones

Isodactylactis is a genus of cnidarians belonging to the family Cerianthidae.

Species:

- Isodactylactis affinis Calabresi, 1927
- Isodactylactis borealis Widersten, 1998
- Isodactylactis discors (Senna, 1907)
- Isodactylactis elegans (Beneden, 1897)
- Isodactylactis kempi Leloup, 1964
- Isodactylactis obscura Calabresi, 1927
- Isodactylactis praecox (Senna, 1907)
- Isodactylactis tardiva (Senna, 1907)
