= Cerianthula =

Scientific classification
- Kingdom: Animalia
- Phylum: Cnidaria
- Subphylum: Anthozoa
- Class: Hexacorallia
- Order: Ceriantharia
- Family: Botrucnidiferidae
- Genus: Cerianthula; Beneden, 1897

Genus of cnidarians

Cerianthula is a genus of cnidarians belonging to the family Botrucnidiferidae.

The species of this genus are found in Atlantic Ocean.

== Species ==
Species:

- Cerianthula atlantica Carlgren, 1931
- Cerianthula atlantica Van Beneden, 1924
- Cerianthula benguelaensis Leloup, 1964
