= Botruanthus =

Scientific classification
- Domain: Eukaryota
- Kingdom: Animalia
- Phylum: Cnidaria
- Subclass: Ceriantharia
- Family: Botrucnidiferidae
- Genus: Botruanthus; McMurrich, 1910

Genus of cnidarians

Botruanthus is a genus of cnidarians belonging to the family Botrucnidiferidae.

The species of this genus are found in Northern America.

Species:

- Botruanthus benedeni (Torrey & Kleeberger, 1909)
- Botruanthus mexicanus Stampar, González-Muñoz & Morandini, 2016
