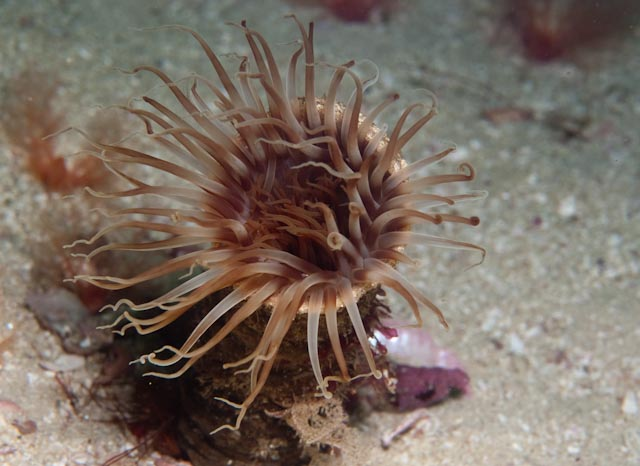
- Burrowing anemone Ceriantheopsis austroafticanus

Scientific classification
- Kingdom: Animalia
- Phylum: Cnidaria
- Subphylum: Anthozoa
- Class: Hexacorallia
- Order: Ceriantharia
- Family: Cerianthidae
- Genus: Ceriantheopsis; Carlgren, 1912

Species
- See text

= Ceriantheopsis =

Genus of sea anemones

Ceriantheopsis is a genus of tube-dwelling anemones in the family Cerianthidae. Members of the genus are found only in the Atlantic Ocean. They are predators, scavengers and omnivores.

== Species ==
Species in the genus include:

- Ceriantheopsis americana (Agassiz in Verrill, 1864)
- Ceriantheopsis austroafricanus Molodtsova, Griffiths & Acuna, 2011 - the burrowing anemone
- Ceriantheopsis lineata Stampar, Scarabino, Pastorino & Morandini, 2015
- Ceriantheopsis nikitai Molodtsova, 2001
