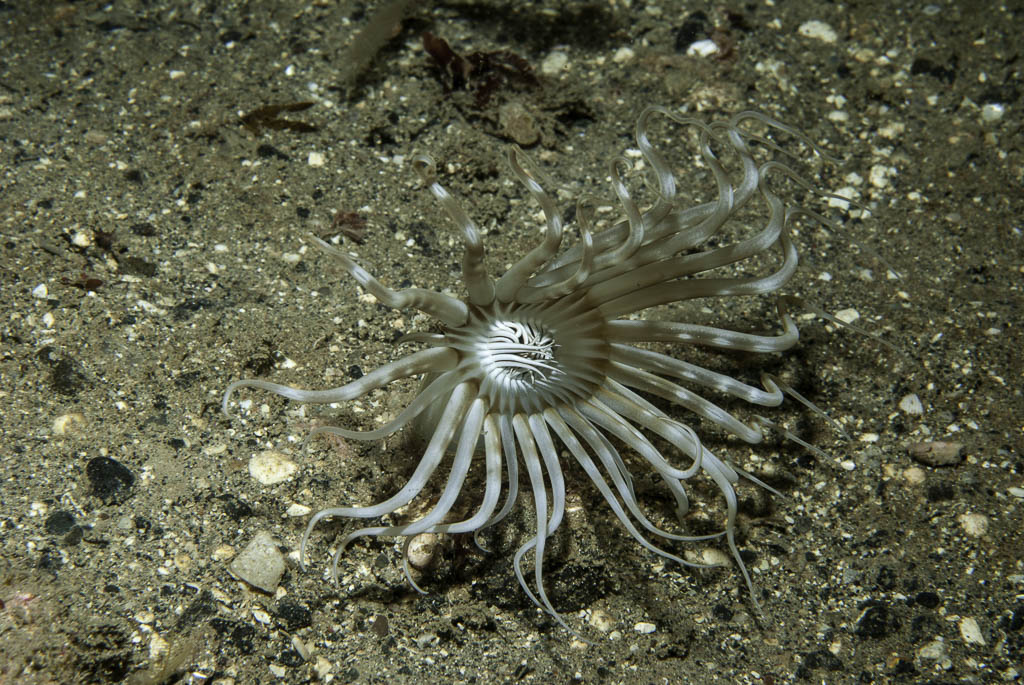
- The tube anemone Arachnanthus sarsi, Rathlin Island, Northern Ireland.

Scientific classification
- Kingdom: Animalia
- Phylum: Cnidaria
- Subphylum: Anthozoa
- Class: Hexacorallia
- Order: Ceriantharia
- Family: Arachnactidae
- Genus: Arachnanthus; Carlgren, 1912

Type species
- Arachnanthus sarsi Carlgren, 1912

Species
- See text

= Arachnanthus =

Genus of sea anemones

Arachnanthus is a genus of tube-dwelling anemones in the family Arachnactidae. Members of the genus are found worldwide.

== Characteristics ==
Arachnanthus species live in parchment-like tubes which are buried in muddy or sandy sediment. Some species are nocturnal.

== Species ==
The following species are currently included in the genus according to the World Register of Marine Species:

- Arachnanthus australiae Carlgren, 1937
- Arachnanthus bockii Carlgren, 1924
- Arachnanthus lilith Stampar & El Didi, 2018
- Arachnanthus oligopodus (Cerfontaine, 1891)
- Arachnanthus sarsi Carlgren, 1912

Arachnanthus nocturnus den Hartog, 1977 is now accepted as Isarachnanthus nocturnus (Hartog, 1977).

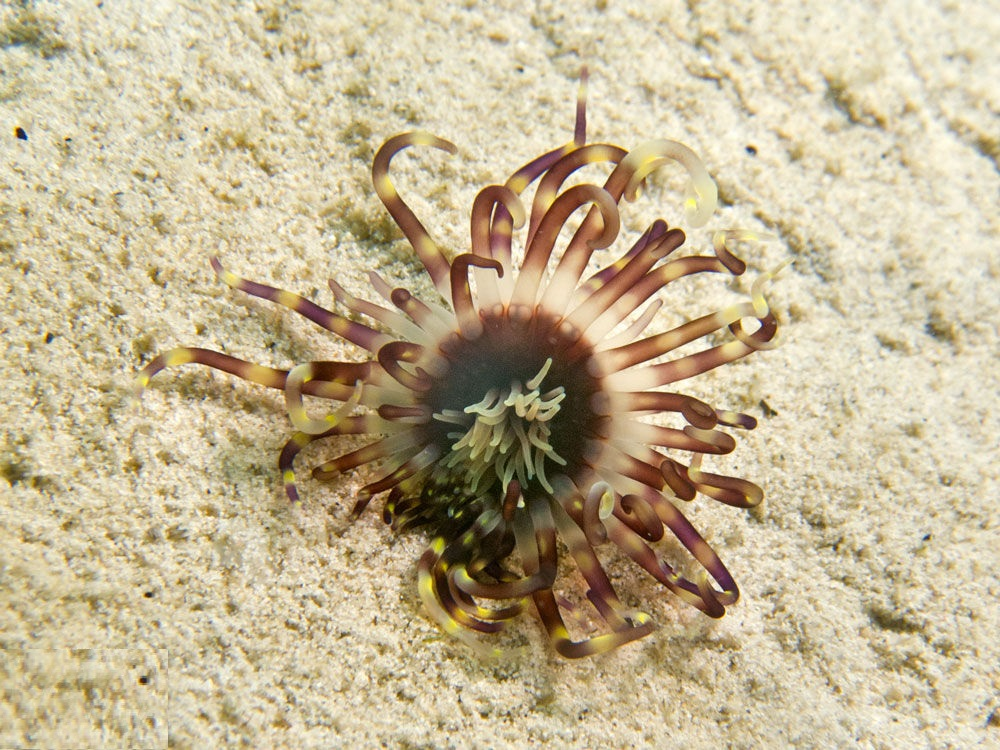
Arachnanthus nocturnus
