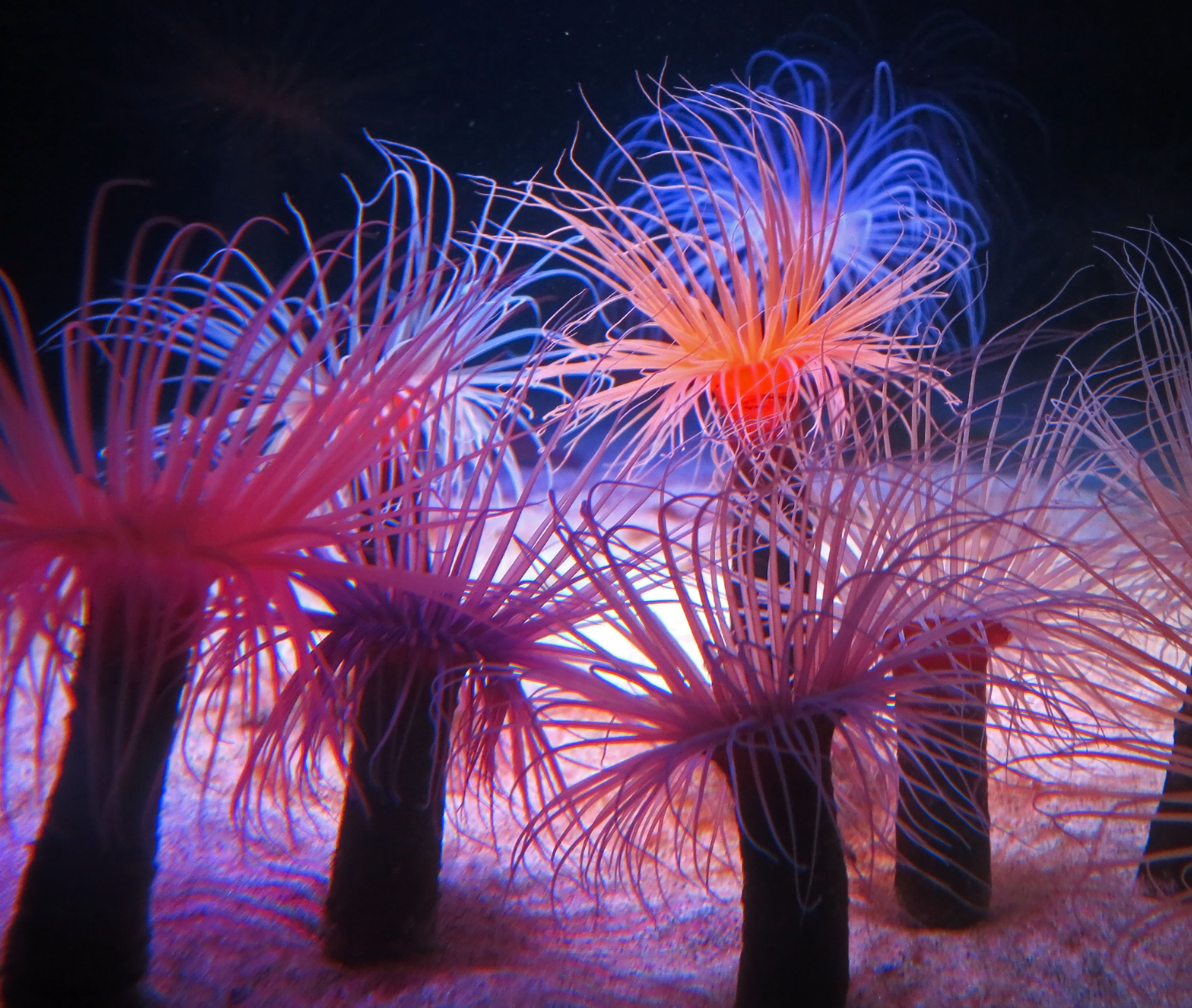
- Pachycerianthus fimbriatus at Monterey Bay Aquarium

Scientific classification
- Domain: Eukaryota
- Kingdom: Animalia
- Phylum: Cnidaria
- Subphylum: Anthozoa
- Class: Hexacorallia
- Order: Ceriantharia
- Family: Cerianthidae
- Genus: Pachycerianthus; Roule, 1904

Species
- See text

= Pachycerianthus =

Genus of sea anemones

Pachycerianthus is a genus of marine tube-dwelling anemones in the family Cerianthidae.

== Species ==
The following species were included in the genus as of 2014 according to the World Register of Marine Species:

- Pachycerianthus aestuarii (Torrey & Kleeburger, 1909)
- Pachycerianthus borealis (Verrill, 1873)
- Pachycerianthus curacaoensis Den Hartog, 1977
- Pachycerianthus delwynae Carter, 1995
- Pachycerianthus dohrni (Van Beneden, 1923)
- Pachycerianthus fimbriatus McMurrich, 1910
- Pachycerianthus insignis Carlgren, 1951
- Pachycerianthus johnsoni (Torrey & Kleeburger, 1909)
- Pachycerianthus longistriatus Carter, 1995
- Pachycerianthus magnus (Nakamoto, 1919)
- Pachycerianthus maua (Carlgren, 1900)
- Pachycerianthus monostichus McMurrich, 1910
- Pachycerianthus multiplicatus Carlgren, 1912
- Pachycerianthus nobilis (Haddon & Shackleton, 1893)
- Pachycerianthus schlenzae Stampar, Morandini & Silveira, 2014
- Pachycerianthus solitarius (Rapp, 1829)
- Pachycerianthus torreyi Arai, 1965
