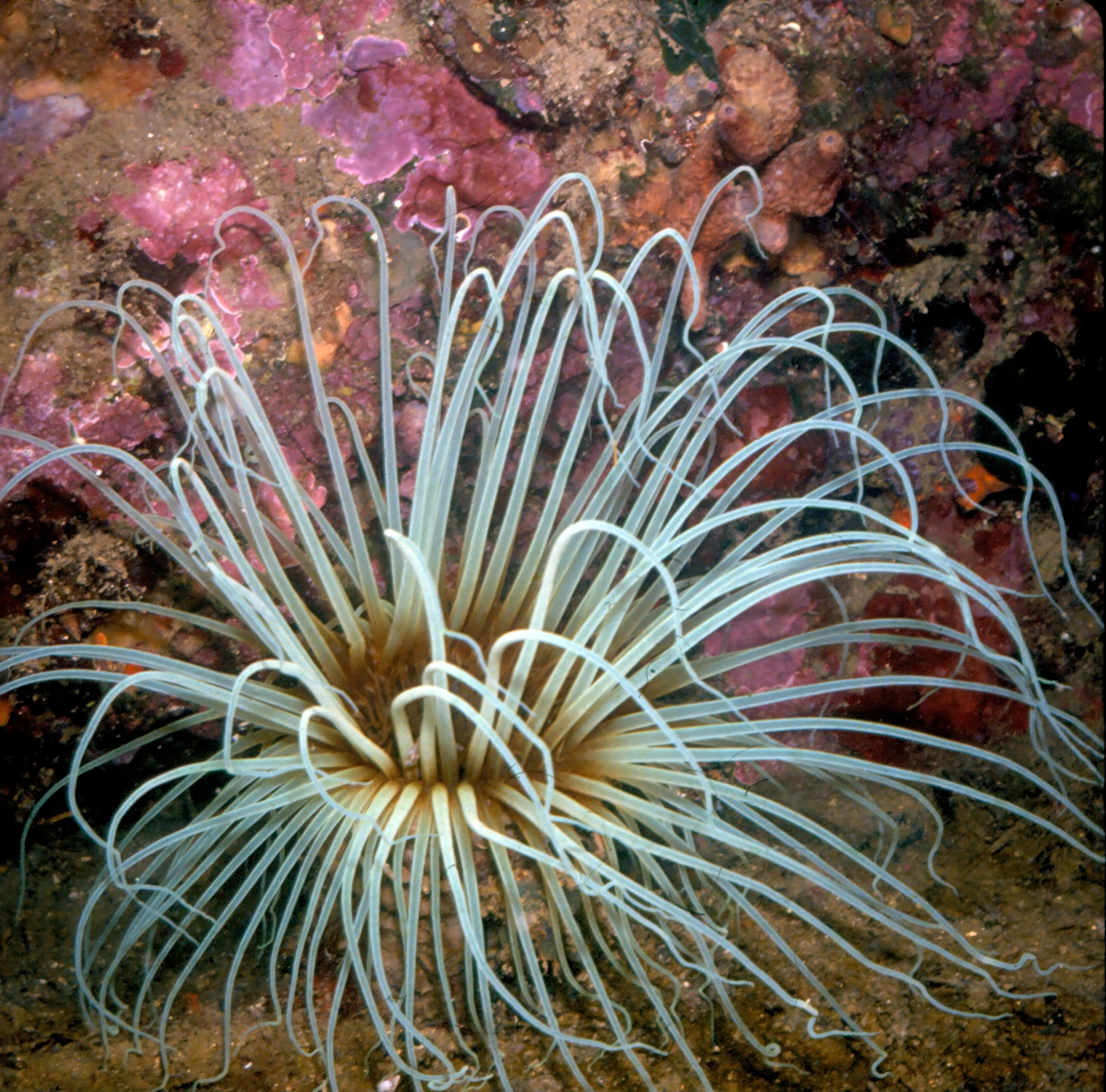
- Cerianthus membranaceus

Scientific classification
- Kingdom: Animalia
- Phylum: Cnidaria
- Subphylum: Anthozoa
- Class: Hexacorallia
- Order: Ceriantharia
- Family: Cerianthidae
- Genus: Cerianthus; Delle Chiaje, 1830

Species
- See text

Synonyms
- Saccanthus Milne Edwards, 1857

= Cerianthus =

Genus of sea anemones

Cerianthus is a genus of tube-dwelling anemones in the family Cerianthidae. Members of the genus are found worldwide. They are predators, scavengers and omnivores.

== Characteristics ==
Members of this genus do not have a pedal disc with which to hold themselves in position. Instead they live semi-buried in soft substrate surrounded by a parchment-like tube which they secrete. This surrounds the whole anemone up to its crown of tentacles. Sand grains, debris and shell fragments usually stick to the outer side of the tube. When it is disturbed, the anemone retracts swiftly back into the tube. Some of the larger species can have a column of up to 25 inches (640 mm) in length. The longitudinal muscles in the trunk are powerful but the transverse ones are weak. The outer ring of tentacles are long and tapering. The tube is flexible and the anemone can extend its tentacles a surprisingly long way. The inner ring of tentacles surrounds the central mouth and assists in pushing food inside.

== Species ==
The following species are currently included in the genus according to the World Register of Marine Species:

- Cerianthus bathymetricus Mosley, 1877
- Cerianthus brasiliensis Mello-Leitão, 1919
- Cerianthus filiformis Carlgren, 1893
- Cerianthus incertus Roule, 1904
- Cerianthus japonicus Carlgren, 1924
- Cerianthus lloydii Gosse, 1859
- Cerianthus malakhovi Molodtsova, 2001
- Cerianthus membranaceus (Spallanzani, 1784)
- Cerianthus mortenseni Carlgren, 1924
- Cerianthus punctatus Uchida, 1979
- Cerianthus roulei Carlgren, 1912
- Cerianthus sulcatus Kwietniewski, 1898
- Cerianthus taedus McMurrich, 1910
- Cerianthus valdiviae Carlgren, 1912
- Cerianthus vogti Danielssen, 1890
