= Botrucnidifer =

Scientific classification
- Domain: Eukaryota
- Kingdom: Animalia
- Phylum: Cnidaria
- Subclass: Ceriantharia
- Family: Botrucnidiferidae
- Genus: Botrucnidifer; Carlgren, 1912

Synonyms
- Botracnidifer (misspelling)

Genus of cnidarians

Botrucnidifer is a genus of cnidarians belonging to the family Botrucnidiferidae.

The species of this genus are found in Europe and Africa.

Species:

- Botrucnidifer norvegicus Carlgren, 1912
- Botrucnidifer shtokmani Molodtsova, 2001
