= Gymnanthula =

Scientific classification
- Domain: Eukaryota
- Kingdom: Animalia
- Phylum: Cnidaria
- Class: Hexacorallia
- Order: Ceriantharia
- Family: Botrucnidiferidae
- Genus: Gymnanthula; Leloup, 1964

Genus of cnidarians

Gymnanthula is a genus of cnidarians belonging to the family Botrucnidiferidae.

The species of this genus are found in Northeastern Africa.

Species:

- Gymnanthula sennai (Calabresi, 1927)
