= Gulf of Venice =

Informally recognized gulf of the Adriatic Sea

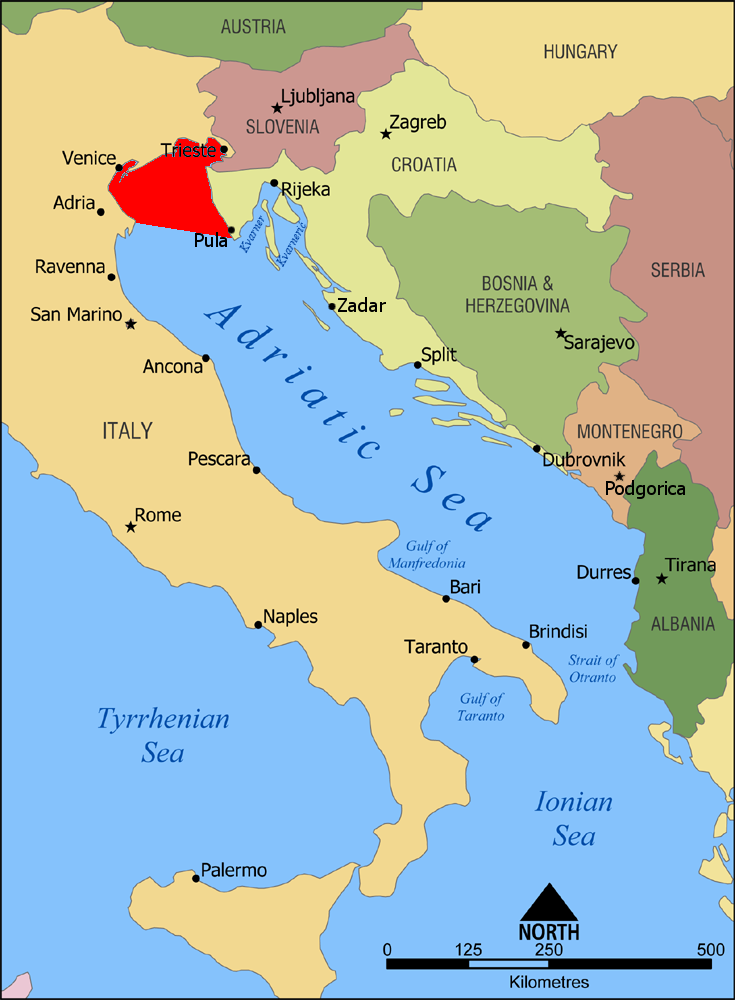
- Gulf of Venice highlighted in red within the Adriatic Sea

- Location within Italy
- Location: Europe
- Coordinates: 45°19′N 13°00′E
- Basin countries: Italy, Slovenia, Croatia
- Average depth: 38 m (125 ft)
- Settlements: List: (Italy) Venice (Italy) Trieste (Croatia) Pula (Italy) Adria

The Gulf of Venice is an informally recognized gulf of the Adriatic Sea. It lies at the extreme north end of the Adriatic, limited on the southwest by the easternmost point of the Po Delta in Italy and on the southeast by the southernmost point of the Istrian Peninsula in Croatia. It is bordered by the coastlines of northeastern Italy, and southwestern Slovenia, and western Croatia.

== Geography ==
The gulf is not formally recognized by the International Hydrographic Organization. Under its usual informal definition, it is bound on the south by the line between Maestra Point, the easternmost point of the Po Delta in Northern Italy, and Cape Kamenjak, the southernmost point of the Istrian Peninsula in Croatia. It is bound on all other sides by the northern shore of the Adriatic. As such, it is about 120 kilometers (75 mi) wide and has an average depth of 38 meters (125 ft). An area at the northeastern end of the gulf is sometimes distinguished as the Gulf of Trieste, informally defined as the part of the Adriatic northeast of a line between the southernmost point of Punta Tagliamento in Italy and the westernmost point of Savudrija or Punta Salvore in Croatia, an area of about 550 square kilometers (210 sq mi).

The Tagliamento, Piave, Adige, Isonzo, Dragonja, and Brenta Rivers flow into the Gulf of Venice. The major cities along its coast are Venice, Trieste, Koper, Chioggia, and Pula. An important tourist destination in the area is the island of Albarella.

The sea bottom of the gulf is home to many rock formations known as Tegnue.

== History ==
In antiquity the gulf was southern terminus of Amber Road. The importance of the Republic of Venice during the High Middle Ages, Renaissance, and Early Modern Italy gave the name of the Gulf of Venice to the entire Adriatic Sea. The term was limited to the area around Venice as the Latin name for the sea became more common in English and among other European geographers.

== See also ==
- Gulf of Trieste
- Venetian Lagoon
