= Nardophyllum deserticola =

Scientific classification
- Kingdom: Plantae
- Clade: Tracheophytes
- Clade: Angiosperms
- Clade: Eudicots
- Clade: Asterids
- Order: Asterales
- Family: Asteraceae
- Genus: Nardophyllum
- Species: N. deserticola

Binomial name
- Nardophyllum deserticola (Cabrera) G.L.Nesom

Synonyms
- Aylacophora deserticola Cabrera

Species of flowering plant

Nardophyllum deserticola is a species of flowering plant in the family Asteraceae, native to Argentina. It was first described in 1953 as Aylacophora deserticola.
