= Angianthula =

Scientific classification
- Domain: Eukaryota
- Kingdom: Animalia
- Phylum: Cnidaria
- Subclass: Ceriantharia
- Family: Botrucnidiferidae
- Genus: Angianthula; Leloup, 1964

Genus of cnidarians

Angianthula is a genus of cnidarians belonging to the family Botrucnidiferidae.

The species of this genus are found in Western Africa.

Species:

- Angianthula bargmannae Leloup, 1964
- Angianthula cerfontaini Leloup, 1968
