= Atractanthula =

Scientific classification
- Domain: Eukaryota
- Kingdom: Animalia
- Phylum: Cnidaria
- Subclass: Ceriantharia
- Family: Botrucnidiferidae
- Genus: Atractanthula; Leloup, 1964

Genus of cnidarians

Atractanthula is a genus of cnidarians belonging to the family Botrucnidiferidae.

Species:

- Atractanthula johni Leloup, 1964
