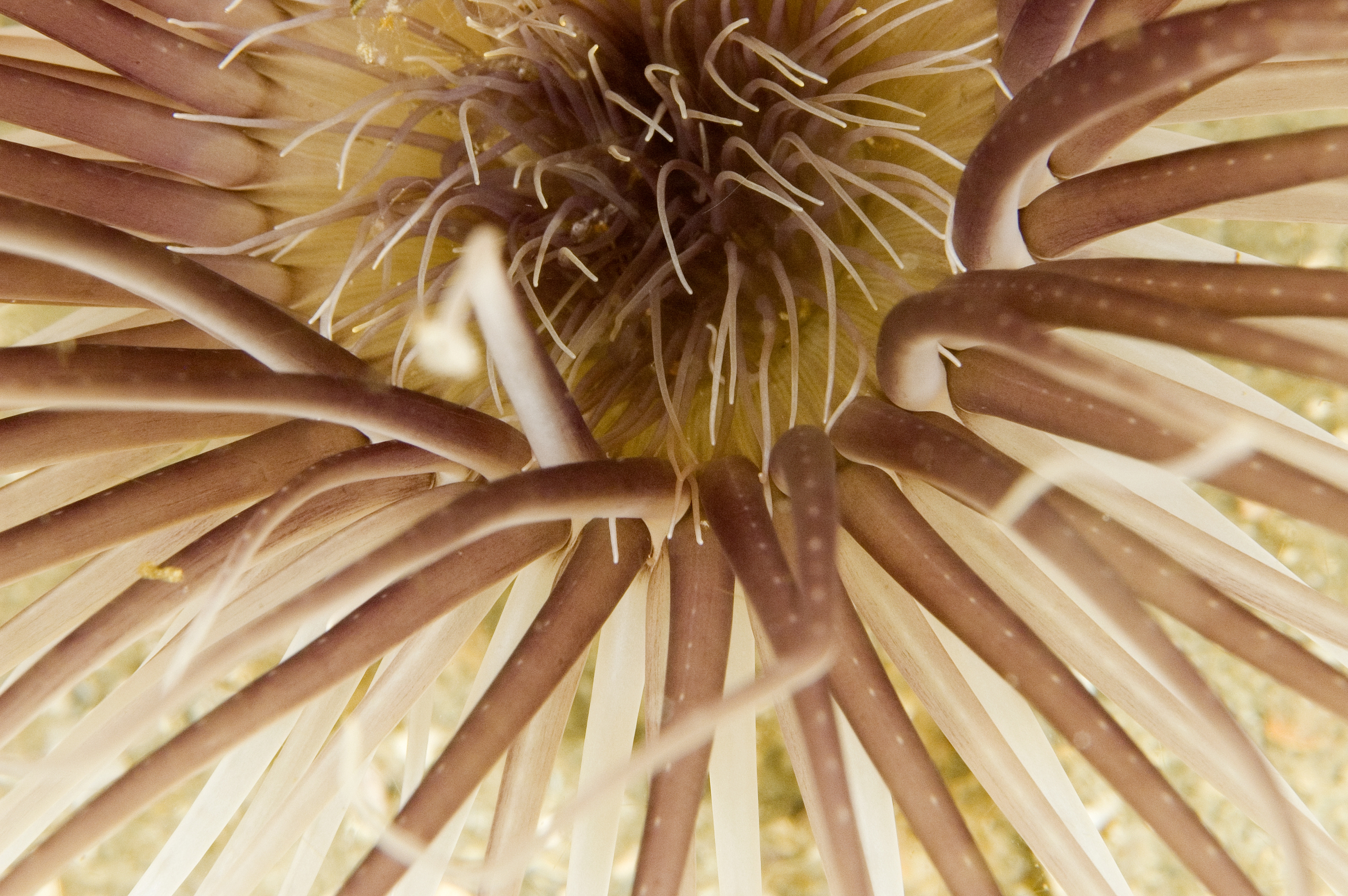
- Close-up of the crown; the outer whorl of tentacles are large and the inner whorl small

Scientific classification
- Kingdom: Animalia
- Phylum: Cnidaria
- Subphylum: Anthozoa
- Class: Hexacorallia
- Order: Ceriantharia
- Family: Cerianthidae
- Genus: Ceriantheopsis
- Species: C. americana

Binomial name
- Ceriantheopsis americana (Agassiz in Verrill, 1864)

Synonyms
- Ceriantheopsis americanus

= Ceriantheopsis americana =

Species of sea anemone

Ceriantheopsis americana is a species of tube-dwelling anemone in the family Cerianthidae. It is a burrowing species and lives in deep sand or muddy sand in a long slender tube that it creates.

== Description ==
Ceriantheopsis americana is a large tube-dwelling anemone. The crown of tentacles can have a diameter of up to 10 cm (4 in) and project for 10 cm above the surface of the sediment. This anemone has a slender, elongated body and creates a tough, felted, leathery tube to line its burrow, using discharged cnidocytes stuck together with mucus and incorporating sand grains on the outer surface. The tube is orientated vertically in the sediment, with a maximum length of about 35 cm (14 in). There is often a connecting short lateral tube branching off near the upper end. The top entrance is somewhat elastic and is up to 1.5 cm (0.6 in) in diameter, and the tube narrows towards the base.

== Distribution and habitat ==
Ceriantheopsis americana is native to the western Atlantic Ocean where it occurs between Maine and Cape Hatteras in the United States. It occurs in soft substrates in the sublittoral zone and the lowest parts of the littoral zone in sheltered areas, being most common just below the low tide mark.

== Ecology ==
During the day the anemone retreats into its tube and closes the entrance. As evening approaches and at night, it extends its crown of tentacles and spreads the longer tentacles around the tube entrance. It is a predator and mostly feeds on calanoid copepods, which are planktonic, and harpacticoid copepods, which are bottom-dwellers. It also consumes barnacles, amphipods and gastropod molluscs.

Ceriantheopsis americana is plentiful in Narragansett Bay, Rhode Island but was overlooked for a long time, probably because of its habit of retreating into its burrow when disturbed. In this location it appears to no longer be present after mid August but then reappears in mid-October. It seems likely that its apparent disappearance is due to it burrowing more deeply into the substrate in that period in order to avoid being eaten by scup (Stenotomus chrysops) when the schools of young fish move inshore. When the fish depart again in the fall, the anemone reappears, at similar sizes and densities to its situation before. Examination of the stomach contents of young scup reinforce this hypothesis.
