= Nardophyllum patagonicum =

Scientific classification
- Kingdom: Plantae
- Clade: Tracheophytes
- Clade: Angiosperms
- Clade: Eudicots
- Clade: Asterids
- Order: Asterales
- Family: Asteraceae
- Genus: Nardophyllum
- Species: N. patagonicum

Binomial name
- Nardophyllum patagonicum (Cabrera) G.L.Nesom

Synonyms
- Paleaepappus patagonicus Cabrera

Species of plant

Nardophyllum patagonicum is a species of flowering plant in the family Asteraceae, native to south Argentina. It was first described in 1969 as Paleaepappus patagonicus.
