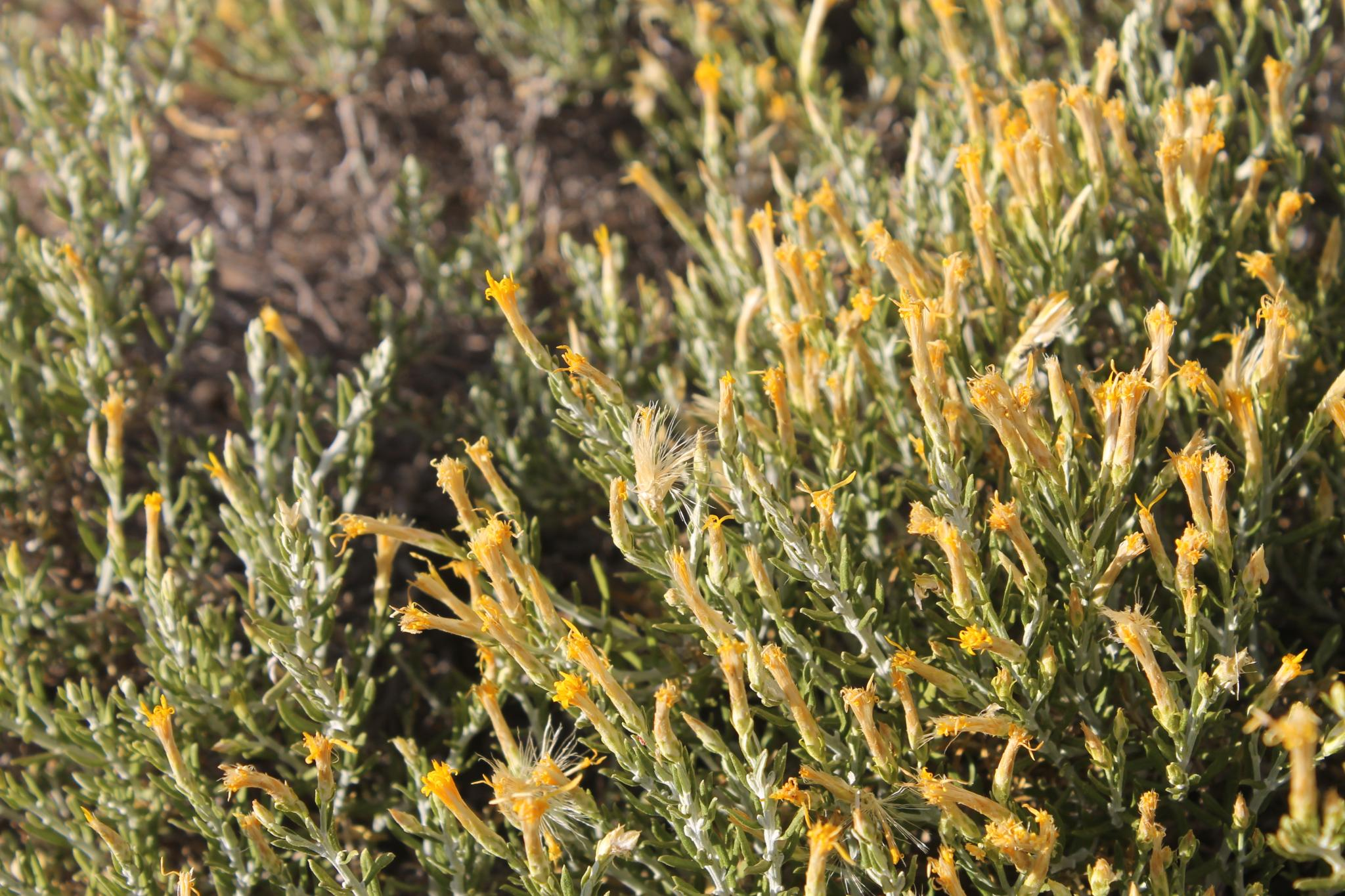
- Nardophyllum lanatum

Scientific classification
- Kingdom: Plantae
- Clade: Embryophytes
- Clade: Tracheophytes
- Clade: Angiosperms
- Clade: Eudicots
- Clade: Asterids
- Order: Asterales
- Family: Asteraceae
- Subfamily: Asteroideae
- Tribe: Astereae
- Subtribe: Chiliotrichinae
- Genus: Nardophyllum; Hook. & Arn.

Type species
- Nardophyllum revolutum (syn. of Nardophyllum lanatum) (D.Don ex Hook. & Arn.) Hook. & Arn.

Synonyms
- Anactinia J.Rémy; Aylacophora Cabrera; Gochnatia subgen. Nardophyllum Hook. & Arn.; Dolichogyne DC.; Ocyroe Phil.; Paleaepappus Cabrera

= Nardophyllum =

Genus of flowering plants

Nardophyllum is a genus of South American flowering plants in the tribe Astereae within the family Asteraceae.

== Species ==
As of March 2025, Plants of the World Online accepted the following species:

- Nardophyllum armatum (Wedd.) Reiche
- Nardophyllum bryoides (Lam.) Cabrera
- Nardophyllum chiliotrichoides (J.Rémy) A.Gray
- Nardophyllum deserticola (Cabrera) G.L.Nesom
- Nardophyllum genistoides A.Gray
- Nardophyllum lanatum (Meyen) Cabrera
- Nardophyllum patagonicum (Cabrera) G.L.Nesom
