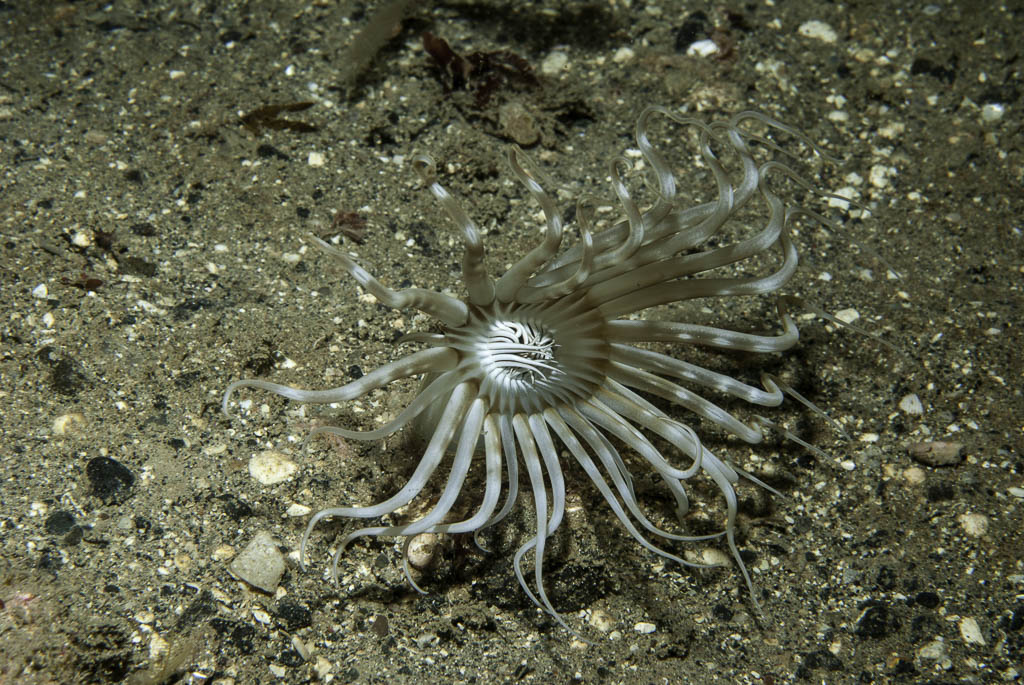
- The ceriantharian Arachnanthus sarsi, Rathlin Island, Northern Ireland.

Scientific classification
- Kingdom: Animalia
- Phylum: Cnidaria
- Subphylum: Anthozoa
- Class: Hexacorallia
- Order: Ceriantharia
- Suborder: Penicillaria den Hartog, 1977
- Family: Arachnactidae; McMurrich, 1910

Genera
- See text

= Arachnactidae =

Family of sea anemones

Arachnactidae is a family of tube-dwelling anemones in the order Ceriantharia. It is the only family in the monotypic order Penicillaria and comprises around 38 species. They differ from other ceriantharians in the makeup of their cnidome (the types of cnidocyte present), the relative sizes of the oral discs and the shape and structure of the mesenteries. These tube anemones dwell in parchment-like tubes immersed in soft sediment, and have two whorls of tentacles, the outer ones being much longer than the inner ones.

== Genera ==
The World Register of Marine Species includes the following genera in the family :

- Anactinia Annandale, 1909
- Arachnactis Sars, 1846
- Arachnanthus Carlgren, 1912
- Dactylactis Van Beneden, 1897
- Isapiactis Carlgren, 1924
- Isarachnactis Carlgren, 1924
- Isarachnanthus Carlgren, 1924
- Isovactis Leloup, 1942
- Ovactis Van Beneden, 1897
- Paranactinia Carlgren, 1924
