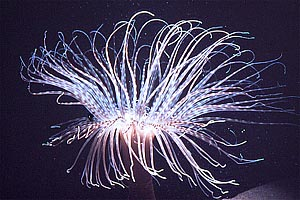
- Cerianthus filiformis

Scientific classification
- Kingdom: Animalia
- Phylum: Cnidaria
- Subphylum: Anthozoa
- Class: Hexacorallia
- Order: Ceriantharia
- Suborder: Spirularia den Hartog, 1977

= Spirularia =

Order of sea anemones

Spirularia is a suborder of marine cnidarians, tube-dwelling anemones, in the class Ceriantharia. It is one of the two suborders making up Ceriantharia, and includes two families, Botrucnidiferidae and Cerianthidae, and around 99 species. The two suborders differ in the makeup of their cnidome (the types of cnidocyte present), the relative sizes of the oral discs and the shape and structure of the mesenteries.

These anemones dwell in parchment-like tubes immersed in soft sediment, and have two whorls of tentacles, the outer tentacles being much longer than the inner ones.
