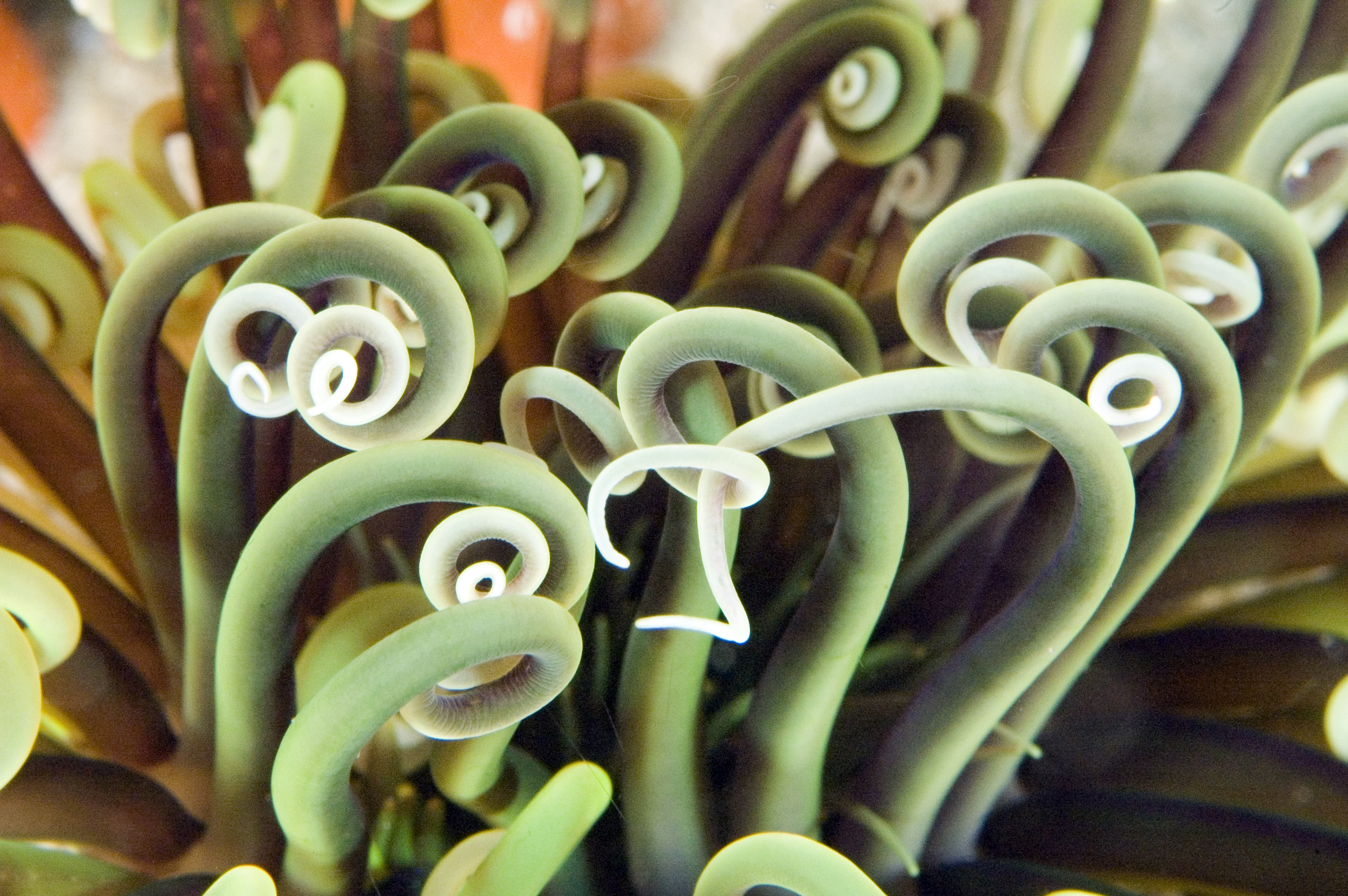
- Ceriantheopsis americanus

Scientific classification
- Kingdom: Animalia
- Phylum: Cnidaria
- Subphylum: Anthozoa
- Class: Hexacorallia
- Order: Ceriantharia
- Suborder: Spirularia
- Family: Cerianthidae; Milne Edwards & Haime, 1852

Genera
- See text

= Cerianthidae =

Family of sea anemones

Cerianthidae is a family of tube-dwelling anemones in the order Spirularia of the subclass Ceriantharia.

== Genera ==
The World Register of Marine Species includes the following genera in the family:

- Anthoactis Leloup, 1932
- Apiactis Beneden, 1897
- Bursanthus Leloup, 1968
- Ceriantheomorphe Carlgren, 1931
- Ceriantheopsis Carlgren, 1912
- Cerianthus Delle Chiaje, 1830
- Engodactylactis Leloup, 1942
- Isodactylactis Carlgren, 1924
- Nautanthus Leloup, 1964
- Pachycerianthus Roule, 1904
- Paradactylactis Carlgren, 1924
- Parovactis Leloup, 1964
- Peponactis Van Beneden, 1897
- Plesiodactylactis Leloup, 1942
- Sacculactis Leloup, 1964
- Solasteractis Van Beneden, 1897
- Synarachnactis Carlgren, 1924
- Syndactylactis Carlgren, 1924
- Trichactis Leloup, 1964
