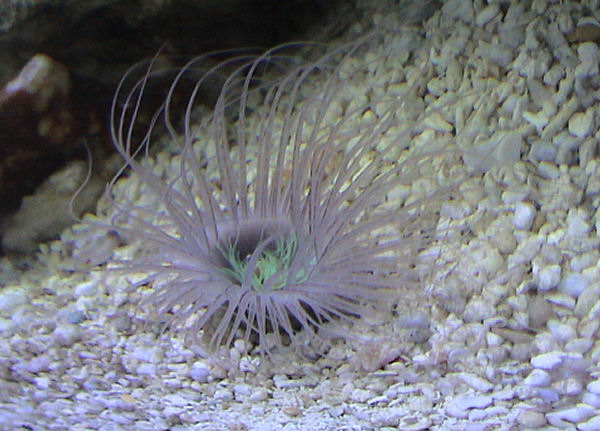
- Cerianthus sp.

Scientific classification
- Kingdom: Animalia
- Phylum: Cnidaria
- Subphylum: Anthozoa
- Class: Hexacorallia
- Order: Ceriantharia; Perrier, 1893

Families
- See text

= Tube-dwelling anemone =

Order of anthozoans

Tube-dwelling anemones or tube anemones are marine invertebrates belonging to the order Ceriantharia, a group of anthozoans related to sea anemones and corals.

== Characteristics ==
They look very similar to the sea anemones (Actiniaria), but are not directly related to them. They are solitary, living buried in soft sediments. They live inside and can withdraw into tubes, which are composed of a fibrous material made from secreted mucus and threads of nematocyst-like organelles known as ptychocysts. Within the tubes of the tube anemones, more than one polyp is present, which is an exceptional trait because species that create tube systems usually contain only one polyp per tube.

Tube anemones have a crown of tentacles that are composed of two whorls of distinctly different-sized tentacles. The outer whorl consists of large tentacles that extend outwards. These tentacles taper to points and are mostly used in food capture and defense. The smaller inner tentacles are held more erect than the larger lateral tentacles and are used for food manipulation and ingestion. The tentacles of tube anemones are venomous, similar to most other cnidarians. The recent exploration of tube anemones and their venomous tentacles permits the exploration of the lineage of venom genes in anthozoans.

A few species such as Anactinia pelagica were thought to be holopelagic, remaining free-floating into maturity. This was later found to be false, with rearing experiments succeeding in adult metamorphosis.

== Fossil record ==
So far, the only fossil record for the group is from Eocene and Oligocene deep-water rocks in Washington State, USA.

== Taxonomy ==
The tube anemones (Ceriantharia) were formerly classified in the taxon (subclass) Ceriantipatharia along with the black corals (Antipatharia), but they are now considered to be basal hexacorals (or, equivalently, a sister taxon to the hexacorals) and unrelated to the black corals.

The current system is shown below:

Order Ceriantharia:

Suborder Spirularia

- Family Botrucnidiferidae Carlgren, 1912
  - Genus Angianthula Leloup, 1964
  - Genus Atractanthula Leloup, 1964
  - Genus Botruanthus McMurrich, 1910
  - Genus Botrucnidiata Leloup, 1932
  - Genus Botrucnidifer Carlgren, 1912
  - Genus Calpanthula van Beneden, 1897
  - Genus Cerianthula Beneden, 1898
  - Genus Gymnanthula Leloup, 1964
  - Genus Hensenanthula van Beneden, 1897
  - Genus Ovanthula van Beneden, 1897
  - Genus Sphaeranthula Leloup, 1955
- Family Cerianthidae Milne-Edwards & Haime, 1852
  - Genus Anthoactis Leloup, 1932
  - Genus Apiactis van Beneden, 1897
  - Genus Bursanthus Leloup, 1968
  - Genus Ceriantheomorphe Carlgren, 1931
  - Genus Ceriantheopsis Carlgren, 1912
  - Genus Cerianthus Delle Chiaje, 1830
  - Genus Engodactylactis Leloup, 1942
  - Genus Isodactylactis Carlgren, 1924
  - Genus Nautanthus Leloup, 1964
  - Genus Pachycerianthus Roule, 1904
  - Genus Paradactylactis Carlgren, 1924
  - Genus Parovactis Leloup, 1964
  - Genus Peponactis van Beneden, 1897
  - Genus Plesiodactylactis Leloup, 1942
  - Genus Sacculactis Leloup, 1964
  - Genus Solasteractis van Beneden, 1897
  - Genus Syndactylactis Carlgren, 1924
  - Genus Trichactis Leloup, 1964

Suborder Penicillaria

- Family Arachnactidae McMurrich, 1910
  - Genus Anactinia Annandale, 1909
  - Genus Arachnactis Sars, 1846
  - Genus Arachnanthus Carlgren, 1912
  - Genus Dactylactis van Beneden, 1897
  - Genus Isapiactis Carlgren, 1924
  - Genus Isarachnactis Carlgren, 1924
  - Genus Isarachnanthus Carlgren, 1924
  - Genus Isovactis Leloup, 1942
  - Genus Ovactis Van Beneden, 1897
  - Genus Paranactinia Carlgren, 1924

Family Synarachnactidae Molodtsova & Simakova, 2023

- Genus Synarachnactis Carlgren, 1924

A 2020 integrative study incorporating molecular phylogenetic reconstructions and morphological assessment across the three families recovered Arachnactidae as a well-supported clade, but did not recover Cerianthidae and Botrucnidiferidae as monophyletic, drawing into question the validity of the Spirularia suborder
