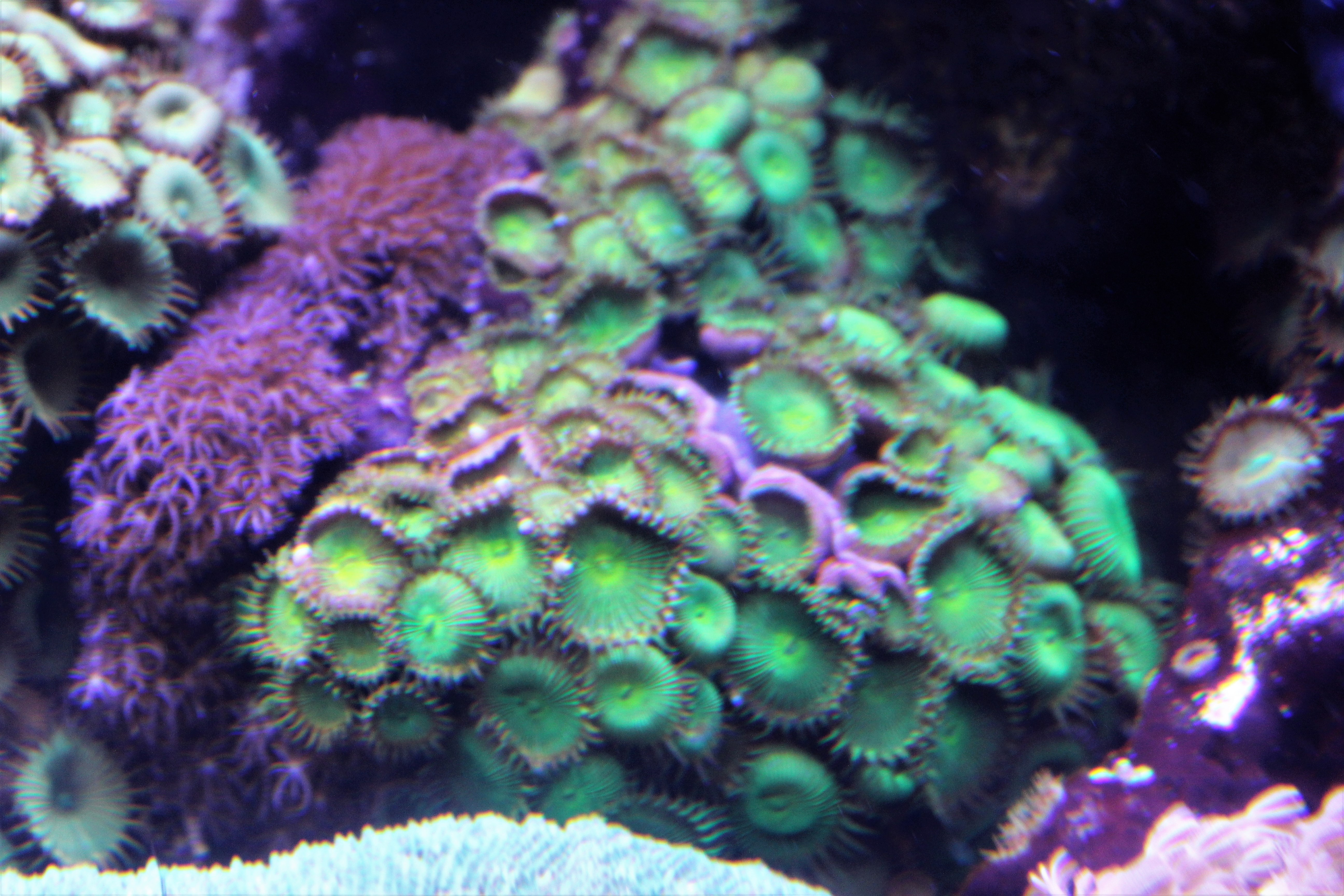

Scientific classification
- Kingdom: Animalia
- Phylum: Cnidaria
- Subphylum: Anthozoa
- Class: Hexacorallia
- Order: Zoantharia
- Family: Zoanthidae
- Genus: Zoanthus
- Species: Z. sociatus

Binomial name
- Zoanthus sociatus (Ellis & Solander, 1786)

Synonyms
- List: Actinia sociata Ellis, 1768; Zoanthus flos-marinus Duchassaing & Michelotti, 1860; Zoanthus nobilis Duchassaing & Michelotti, 1860; Zoanthus poriticola Pax, 1910; Zoanthus proteus Verrill, 1900

= Zoanthus sociatus =

Species of coral

Zoanthus sociatus, commonly known as the green sea mat or button polyp, is a zoanthid usually found in shallow reef zones of tropical regions from Caribbean to southeastern Brazil. Z. sociatus is currently being studied for its use against human lymphatic parasites.

== Taxonomy ==
Zoanthus sociatus has nematocysts, which makes it a cnidarian. As it has polyp morphology, it is an anthozoan. It also has tentacles in multiples of 6, so it falls under the subclass Hexacorallia. It is in the order Zoanthidea due to its lack of a calcium carbonate skeleton.

Forms elaborate piecemeal mats of normally green to turquoise polyps. They are often found on reef flats exposed to high light intensity and intermittently strong currents. Stolon-connected polyps normally have 30 short tentacles, polyps are extended continuously day and night and feed predominantly on detritus, not zooplankton.

== Habitat ==
Z. Sociatus can be found in the lower intertidal and upper subtidal zones on protected Caribbean reefs. It is a sessile, colonial organism. Z. sociatus grows in the reef understory and on disturbed substrate. Z. sociatus can survive desiccation (an excessive loss of moisture) and lower levels of salinity. It appears to dominate other zoanthids.

== Reproduction ==
Reproduction in Z. sociatus is mainly asexual although sexual reproduction may happen as well. There is extratentacular budding, which is the creation of a new polyp from an old polyp, and fission, which is when a new fragment is formed. The size of a fragment is also controlled by the increasing rate of mortality with decreasing fragment size. A colony is generally genetically the same. Even when a colony is sexually reproductive, a large proportion of polyps remain infertile, which demonstrates the greater importance of asexual reproduction and growth.

Z. sociatus colonies do not become reproductive until they reach a certain size. They use external fertilization, and are mostly hermaphroditic, although some are male or protogynous (female and then male). Z. sociatus was found to reproduce seasonally in Panama, and synchronizes the release of gametes with extremely low tides.

== Diet ==
Z. sociatus polyps obtain nearly half of their required energy from the zooxanthellae, organism that Z. Sociatus forms symbiosis with. Therefore, the rest of the energy must be obtained through feeding. Zoanthids have nematocysts on their mesenterial filaments that are used for prey capture. Z. sociatus will eat mostly anything that is the right size such as from Artemia cysts and dissolved organic matter. While zoanthids are less efficient heterotrophs, they produce more energy photosynthetically due to their lack of a calcified skeleton. The lack of a skeleton allows more light to reach the chloroplasts. To digest prey, it uses both extracellular and intracellular methods.
