= Tree anemone =

Tree anemone may refer to several different taxa:

- Acrozoanthus australiae, a species of coral
- Actinodendron arboreum, a species of sea anemone
- Carpenteria californica, a species of evergreen shrub
