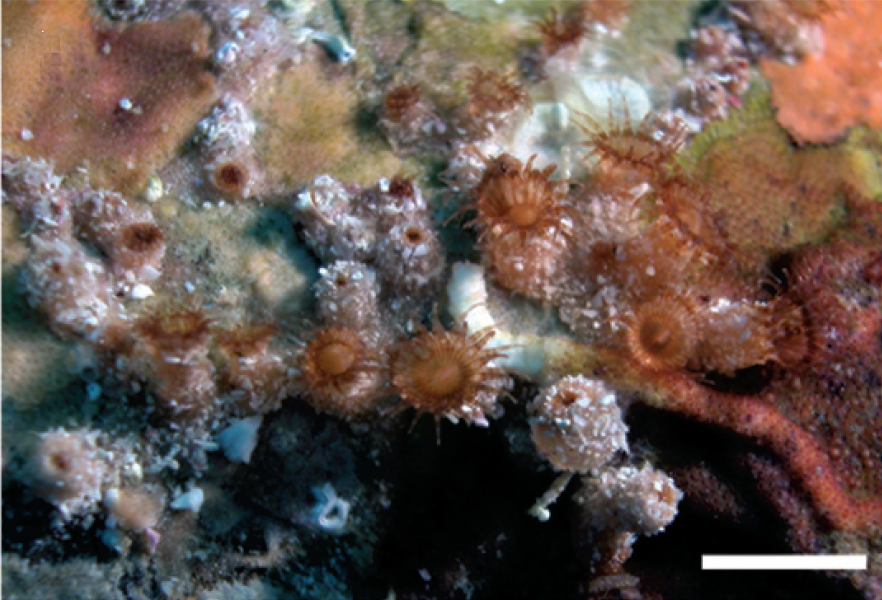

Scientific classification
- Kingdom: Animalia
- Phylum: Cnidaria
- Subphylum: Anthozoa
- Class: Hexacorallia
- Order: Zoantharia
- Family: Hydrozoanthidae
- Genus: Terrazoanthus
- Species: T. sinnigeri

Binomial name
- Terrazoanthus sinnigeri Reimer & Fujii, 2010

= Terrazoanthus sinnigeri =

Species of coral

Terrazoanthus sinnigeri is a species of uncertain validity (taxon inquirendum) of macrocnemic zoanthid first found in the Galapagos. It is potentially a junior synonym of Terrazoanthus patagonichus. It can be distinguished by commonly occurring on rubble and rocks on sandy bottoms, having about 30–36 tentacles, and numerous nematocysts in its pharynx.
