= Actinostephanus =

Actinostephanus may refer to:

- Actinostephanus (cnidarian), a genus of sea anemones
- Actinostephanus (plant), a genus of plants in the Gesneriaceae family
