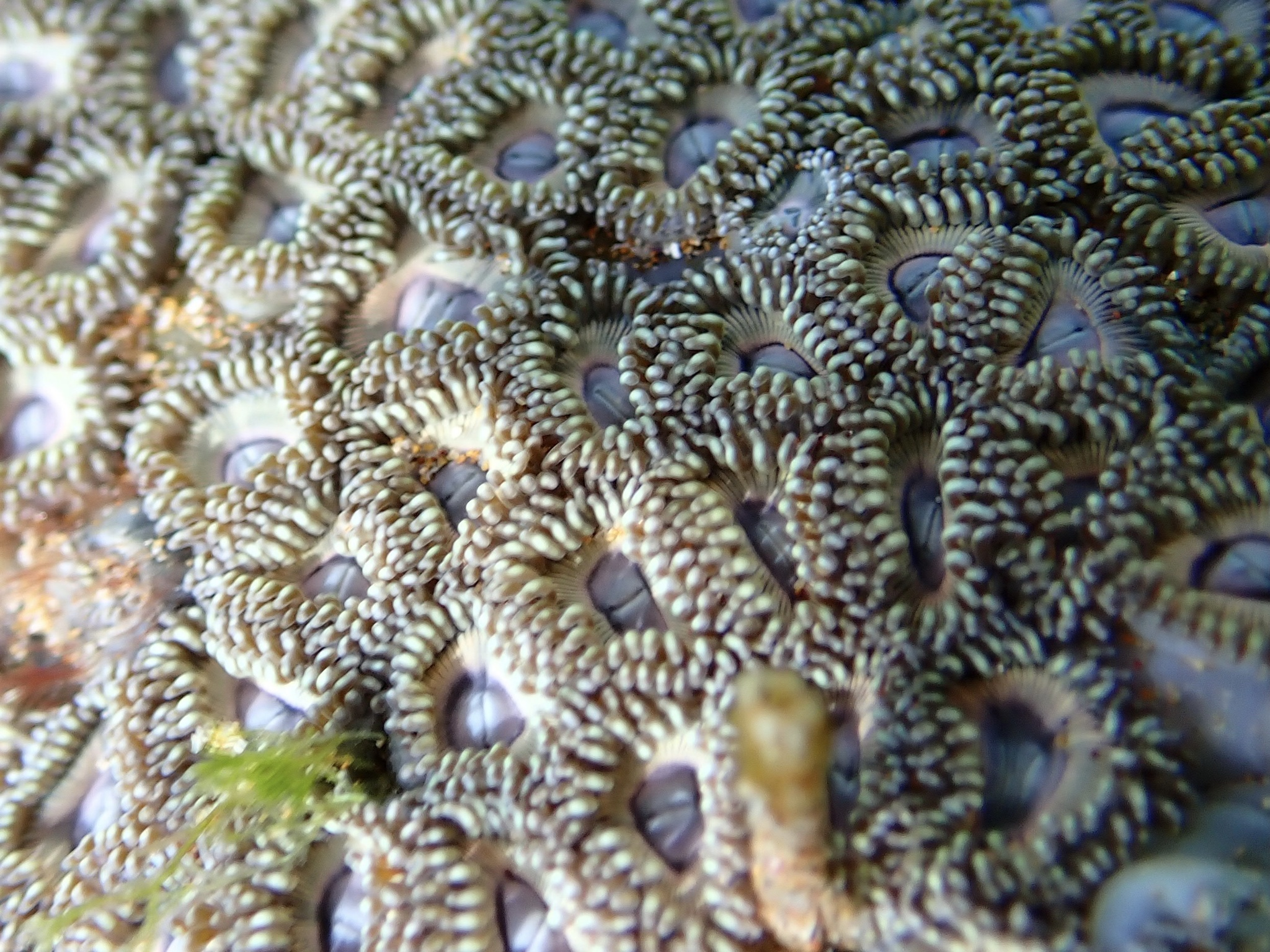

Scientific classification
- Kingdom: Animalia
- Phylum: Cnidaria
- Subphylum: Anthozoa
- Class: Hexacorallia
- Order: Zoantharia
- Family: Zoanthidae
- Genus: Zoanthus
- Species: Z. kuroshio

Binomial name
- Zoanthus kuroshio Reimer et al., 2006

= Zoanthus kuroshio =

Species of coral

Zoanthus kuroshio is a species of zoanthid first described from southern Japan.
