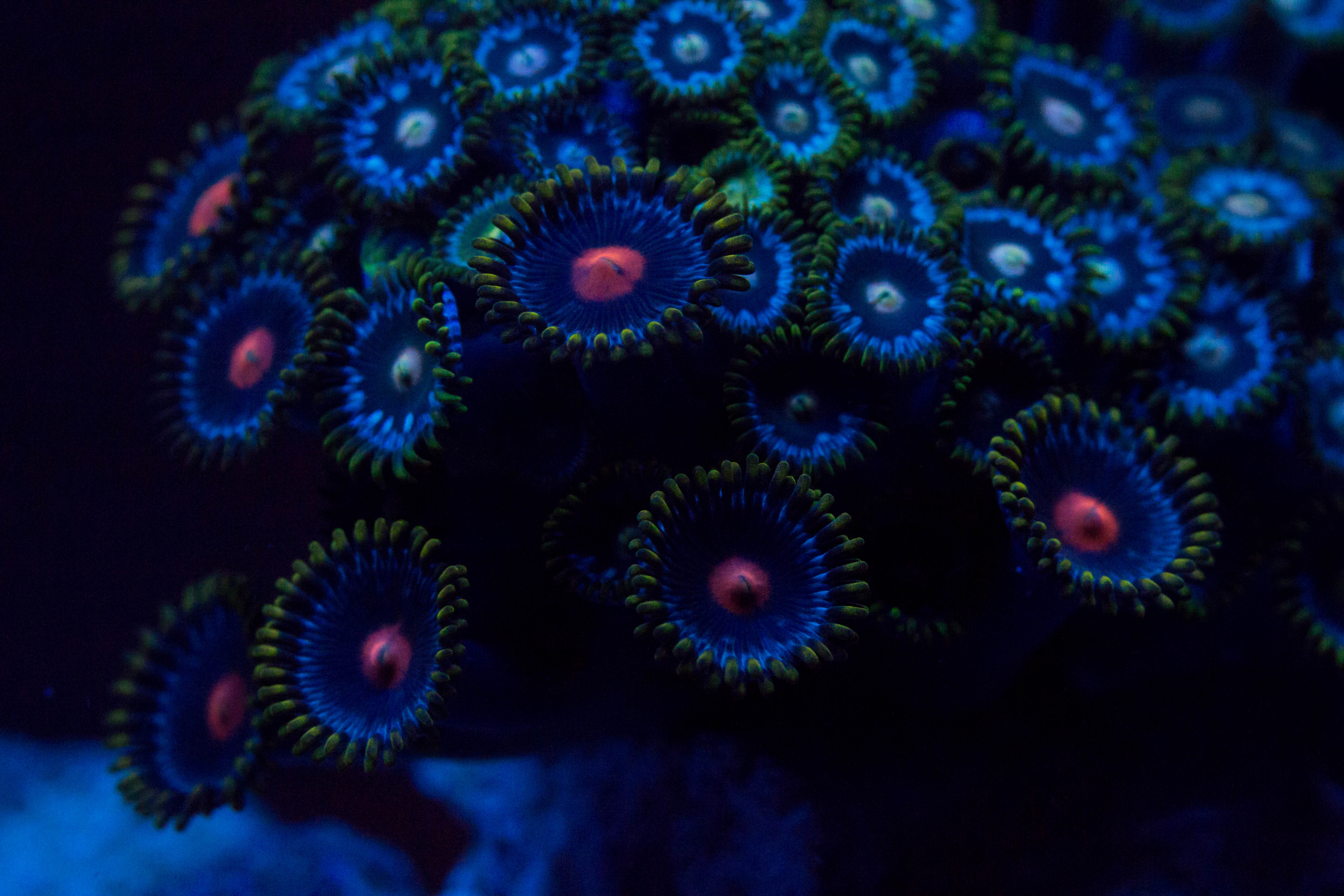
- Zoanthus colony

Scientific classification
- Kingdom: Animalia
- Phylum: Cnidaria
- Subphylum: Anthozoa
- Class: Hexacorallia
- Order: Zoantharia
- Suborder: Brachycnemina; Haddon & Shackleton, 1891

Families
- Neozoanthidae Herberts, 1972; Sphenopidae Hertwig, 1882; Zoanthidae Rafinesque, 1815

= Brachycnemina =

Suborder of cnidarians

Brachycnemina is a suborder of zoanthids in the order Zoantharia. Genetic analysis has been used to suggest Brachycnemina is a monophyletic group diverging within the paraphyletic Macrocnemina.

== Characteristics ==
Brachycnemia species habitate most environments, ranging from shallow tropical reefs to cold seeps in the deep sea. It forms large colonies on intertidal and shallow reef crests. Due to the members of this suborder being loosely collected, there are no standard characteristics uniting them besides slight morphological, ecological and phylogenetic differences.

== Subdivisions ==
This suborder counts with 3 taxonomic families, namely Neozoanthidae, which is monogeneric; Sphenopidae, which includes sand-encrusted and colonial specimens like the commonly found Palythoa and Sphenopus, itself found in a few discrete areas; and Zoanthidae, whose belonging species do not show sand encrustation. A total of 6 known genera and over 163 species are comprised within the Brachycnemina. Palythoa and Zoanthus are two of the most common coral genera and are intensively studied for their bioactive compounds.
