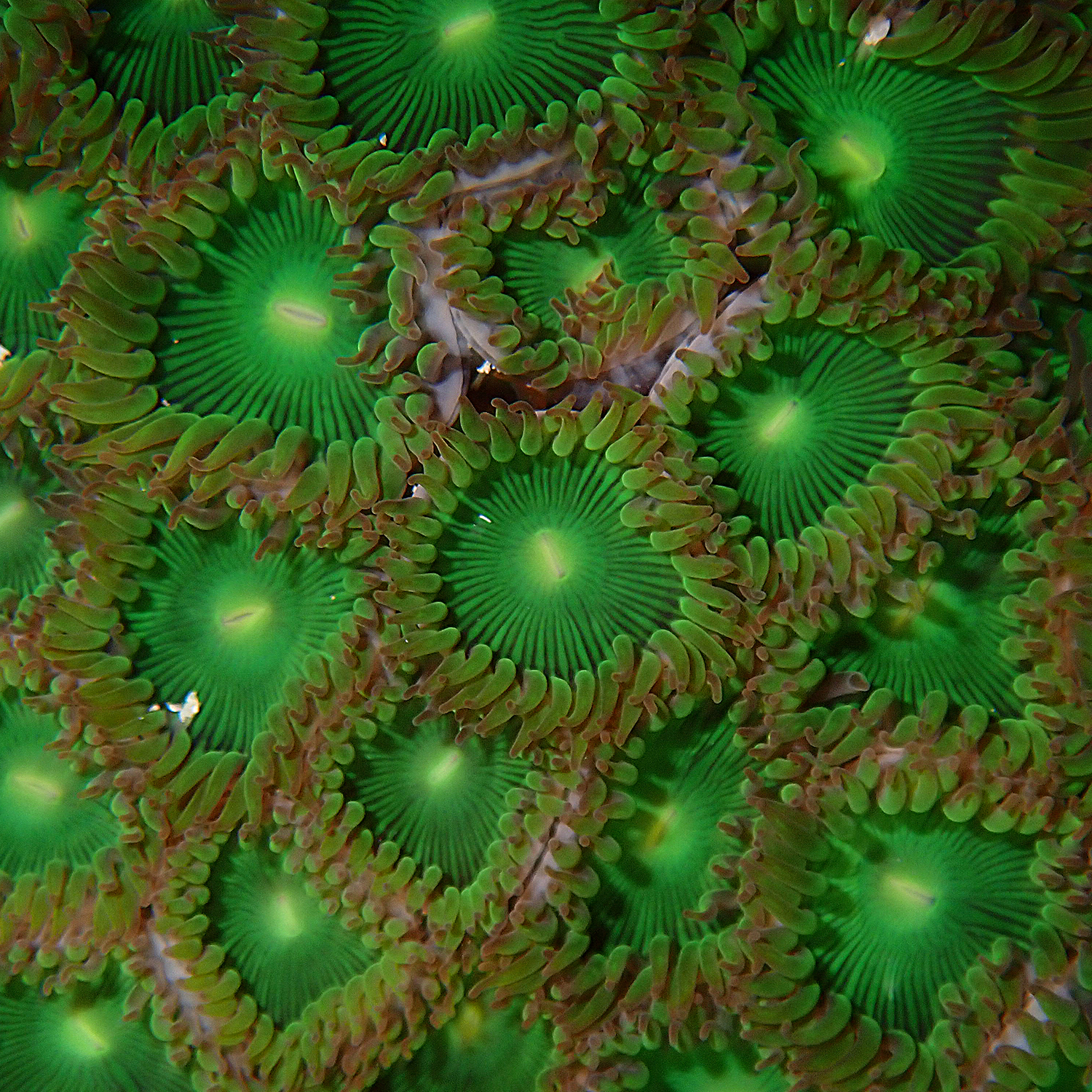

Scientific classification
- Domain: Eukaryota
- Kingdom: Animalia
- Phylum: Cnidaria
- Subphylum: Anthozoa
- Class: Hexacorallia
- Order: Zoantharia
- Family: Zoanthidae
- Genus: Zoanthus
- Species: Z. gigantus

Binomial name
- Zoanthus gigantus Reimer et al., 2006

= Zoanthus gigantus =

Species of coral

Zoanthus gigantus is a zoanthid first described from southern Japan.
