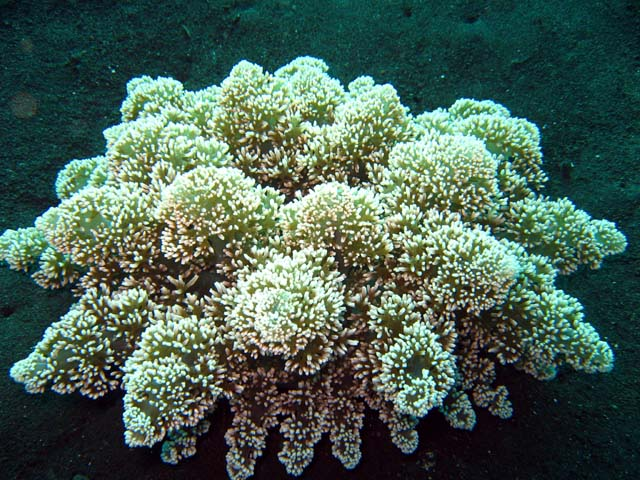

Scientific classification
- Kingdom: Animalia
- Phylum: Cnidaria
- Subphylum: Anthozoa
- Class: Hexacorallia
- Order: Actiniaria
- Family: Actinodendridae
- Genus: Actinodendron
- Species: A. arboreum

Binomial name
- Actinodendron arboreum (Quoy & Gaimard, 1833)

Synonyms
- List: Acremodactyla ambonensis Kwietniewski, 1897; Actinia arborea Quoy & Gaimard, 1833; Actinodendron ambonense (Kwietniewski, 1897); Actinodendron ambonensis (Kwietniewski, 1897); Actinodendron arborea; Actinodendrum arboreum

= Actinodendron arboreum =

Species of sea anemone

Actinodendron arboreum, commonly known as tree anemone or hell's fire anemone, is a species of sea anemone in the family Actinodendronidae. It is native to the Indo-Pacific where it grows at depths of down to 28 metres (92 ft). Most sea anemone species are harmless to humans, but A. arboreum is highly venomous and its sting can cause severe skin ulcers (as also suggested by its alternative name, hell's fire anemone).

== Description ==
The oral disc of Actinodendron arboreum has stripes that radiate from the mouth, and can reach a diameter of 10 to 20 centimetres. The column is elongated when expanded; it has a fairly small pedal disc and is thicker at the distal (upper) end. The tentacles are colourless, around 10 to 20 centimetres long and ramify fractally, being subdivided into branches and branchlets which makes the whole head of tentacles resemble a broccoli. The tentacles grow in whorls as the animal enlarges; the first whorl is six tentacles followed by further whorls of six, twelve and twenty-four tentacles. The first and third whorls of tentacles are endocoelic (set between the mesenteries in the column interior) and the second and fourth are attached marginally. The sea anemone is well-armed with cnidocytes which are of varying lengths, the ones in the central region of the tentacles being least variable.

== Biology ==
Breeding in Actinodendron arboreum takes place when gametes are shed into the body cavity and passed out into the water column. After fertilisation, the planula larva forms part of the plankton before settling on the seabed, undergoing metamorphosis and developing into a juvenile sea anemone.
