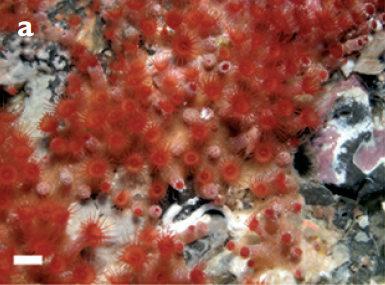
- Terrazoanthus onoi

Scientific classification
- Kingdom: Animalia
- Phylum: Cnidaria
- Subphylum: Anthozoa
- Class: Hexacorallia
- Order: Zoantharia
- Family: Hydrozoanthidae
- Genus: Terrazoanthus
- Species: T. onoi

Binomial name
- Terrazoanthus onoi Reimer & Fujii, 2010

= Terrazoanthus onoi =

Species of coral

Terrazoanthus onoi is a species of uncertain validity (taxon inquirendum) of macrocnemic zoanthid first found in the Galapagos. It is potentially a junior synonym of Terrazoanthus patagonichus. It can be distinguished by its bright red oral disk colour, having about 32–40 tentacles, and having only basitrichs and mastigophores present in its pharynx.
