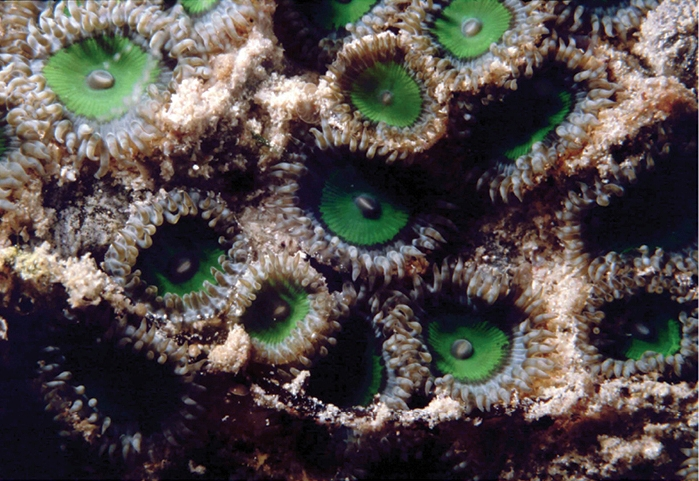

Scientific classification
- Domain: Eukaryota
- Kingdom: Animalia
- Phylum: Cnidaria
- Subphylum: Anthozoa
- Class: Hexacorallia
- Order: Zoantharia
- Family: Zoanthidae
- Genus: Zoanthus
- Species: Z. sansibaricus

Binomial name
- Zoanthus sansibaricus Carlgren, 1900

Synonyms
- Zoanthus cavernarum Pax & Müller, 1957; Zoanthus cyanoides Pax & Müller, 1957; Zoanthus erythrochloros Pax & Müller, 1957; Zoanthus gnophodes Pax & Müller, 1957; Zoanthus pacificus Walsh & Bowers, 1971; Zoanthus zansibaricus Carlgren, 1900

= Zoanthus sansibaricus =

Species of zoanthid

Zoanthus sansibaricus is a species of zoanthid generally found in the Indo-pacific but also off the western coast of South America. The range of habitation has been noted in intertidal zones along with areas below 7 m, but shows phenotypical and morphological differences based on depth and shading. Shaded individuals contain larger polyps compared to unshaded. It can be divided into three reproductive categories, male, female and asexual. Spawning has been observed within the middle of July, using lunar phases as an indicator. Various subclades are theorized to appear based on the time of year.

== Gallery ==
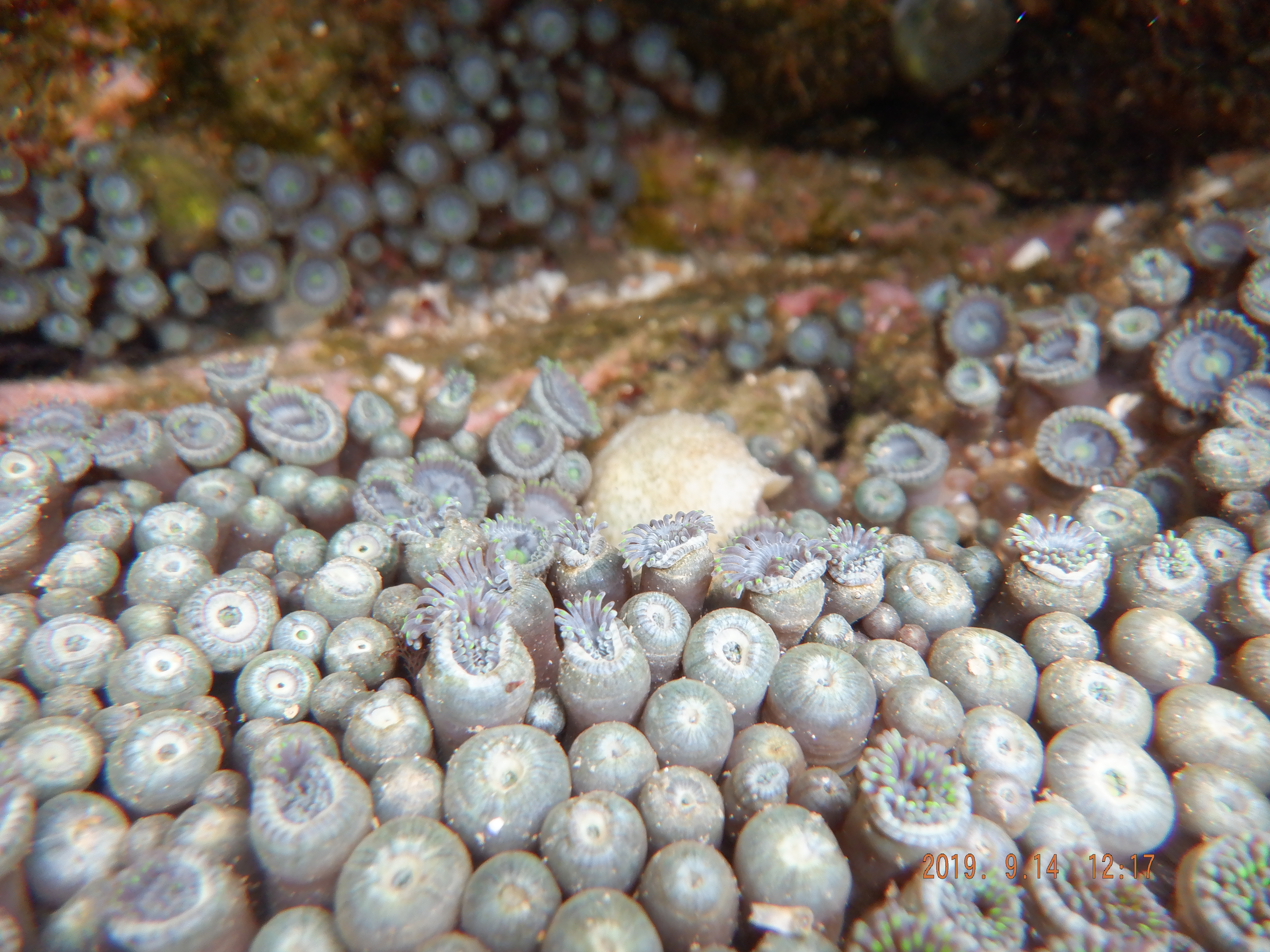
Closed specimen from an Ecuadorian tidepool

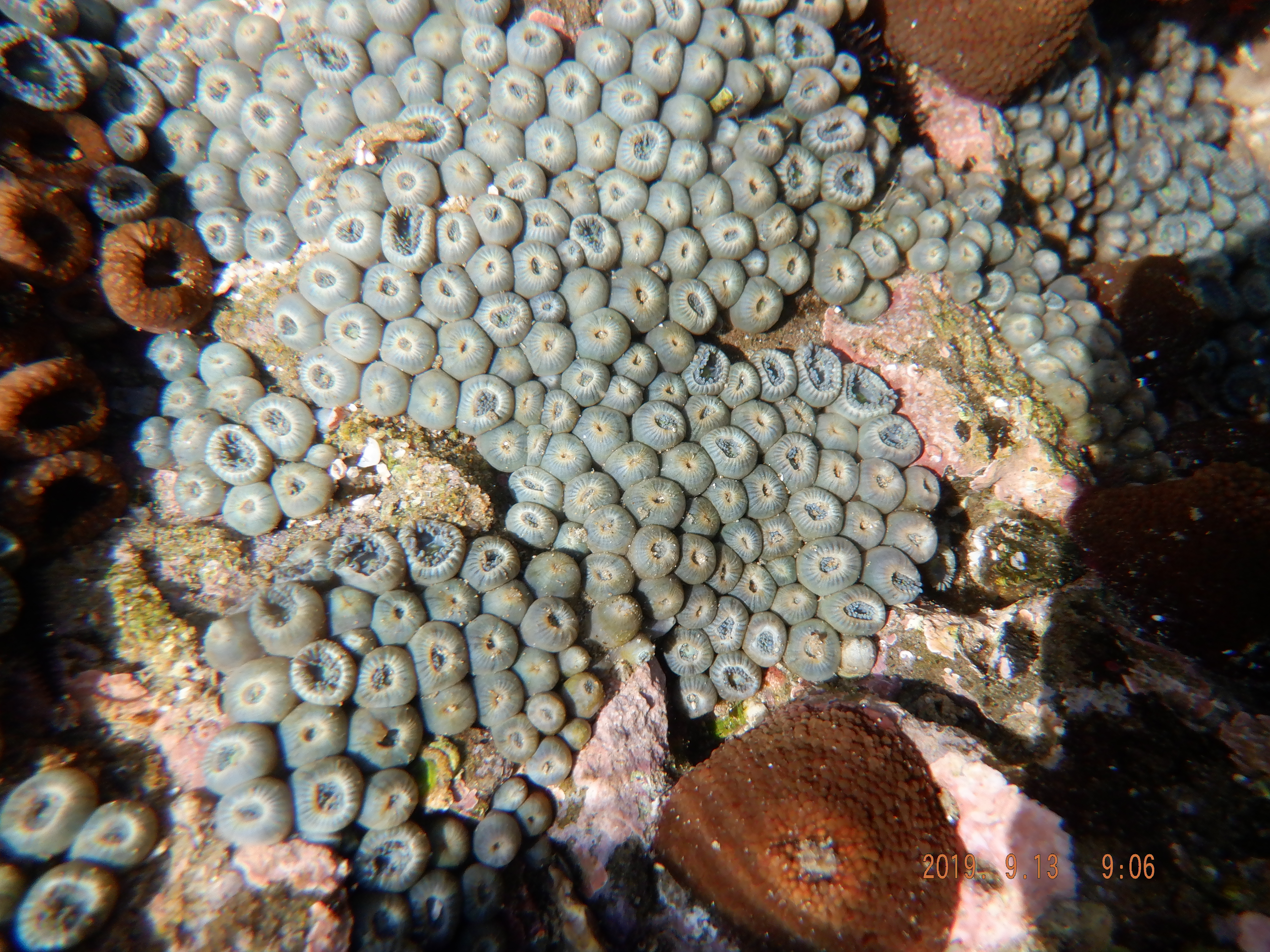
Closed specimen from an Ecuadorian tidepool

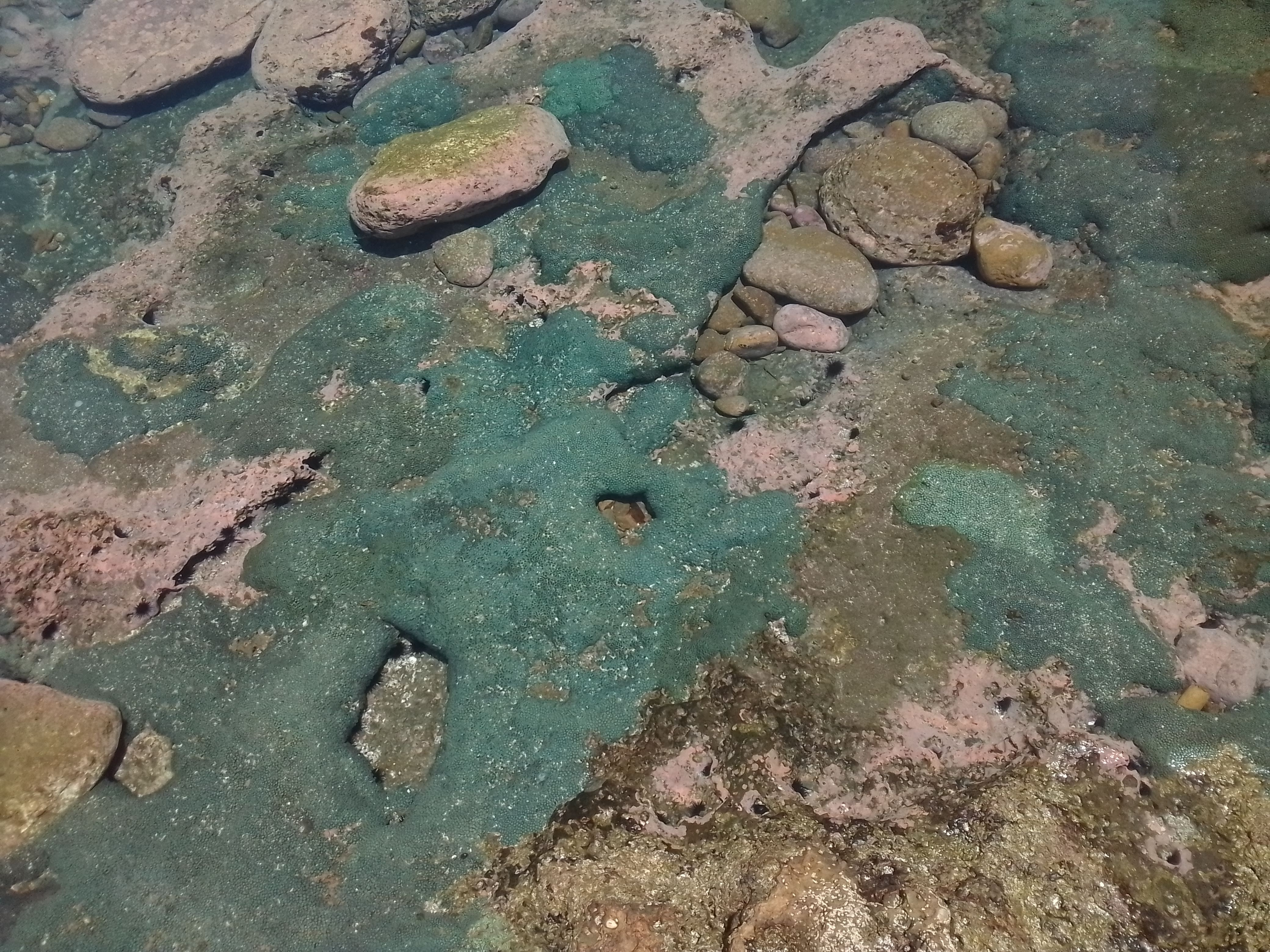
Top view of a group from an Ecuadorian tidepool
