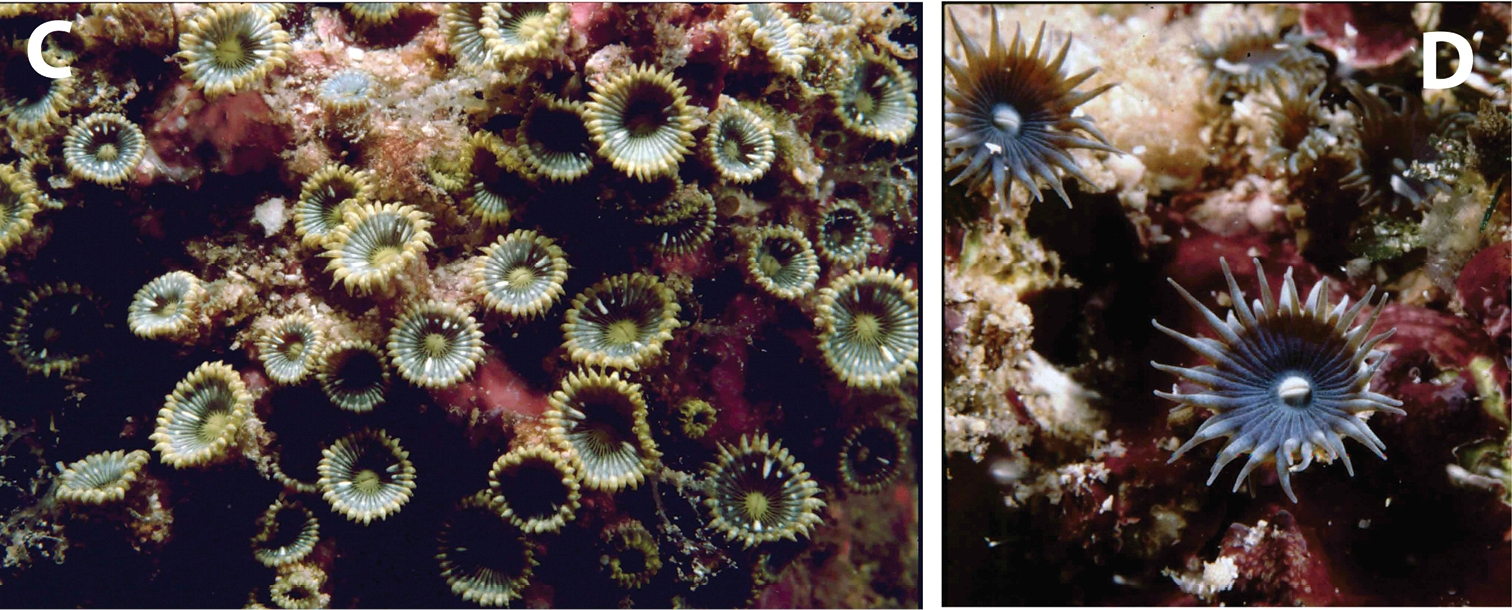

Scientific classification
- Kingdom: Animalia
- Phylum: Cnidaria
- Subphylum: Anthozoa
- Class: Hexacorallia
- Order: Zoantharia
- Suborder: Brachycnemina
- Family: Neozoanthidae; Herberts, 1972
- Genus: Neozoanthus; Herberts, 1972

= Neozoanthus =

Genus of corals

Neozoanthus is a genus of corals belonging to the monotypic family Neozoanthidae.

The species of this genus are found in Southern Africa, Australia.

Species:

- Neozoanthus caleyi Reimer, Irei & Fujii, 2012
- Neozoanthus tulearensis Herberts, 1972
- Neozoanthus uchina Reimer, Irei & Fujii, 2012

== Morphology ==
They form small colonies of polyps between 1.5 and 5 mm in diameter and between 2 and 12 mm in height. The oral disc is surrounded by between 28 and 44 tentacles. Their species have a structure similar to that of the sea anemone, characterized by partial encrustations of sand or detritus in the ectoderm, rarely in the mesoglea, a simple muscle of the endodermal sphincter, and without encrustations at the oral end of the polyps.

The color of the oral discs can be white, beige-green, yellow, bluish-gray, or red.
