= Actinodendron =

Scientific classification
- Kingdom: Animalia
- Phylum: Cnidaria
- Subphylum: Anthozoa
- Class: Hexacorallia
- Order: Actiniaria
- Family: Actinodendridae
- Genus: Actinodendron; Quoy & Gaimard, 1830

Genus of sea anemones

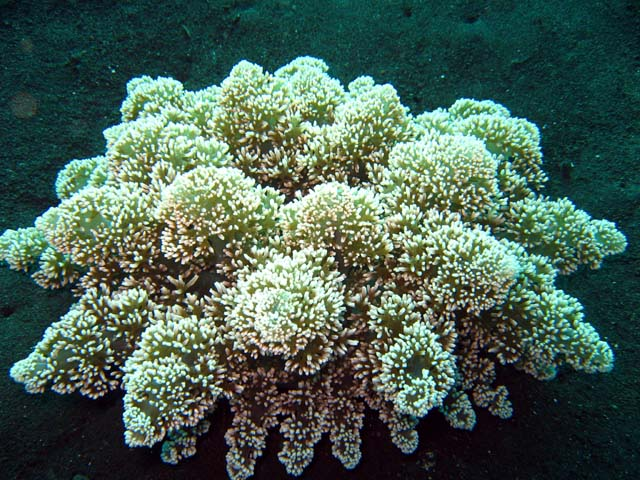
Actinodendron arboreum

Actinodendron is a genus of cnidarians belonging to the family Actinodendridae. Species in this genus—often called “tree anemones”—feature striking tentacles that branch fractally like miniature trees, a structure that enhances their predatory reach. These fascinating anemones inhabit sandy or rubble substrates across the Indo-Pacific, and some species, notably Actinodendron arboreum (the “hell’s fire anemone”), are highly venomous—their stings can inflict severe skin lesions.

== Species ==
Species:

- Actinodendron alcyonoideum (Quoy & Gaimard, 1833)
- Actinodendron arboreum (Quoy & Gaimard, 1833)
- Actinodendron glomeratum Haddon, 1898
- Actinodendron hansingorum Carlgren, 1900
- Actinodendron plumosum Haddon, 1898
