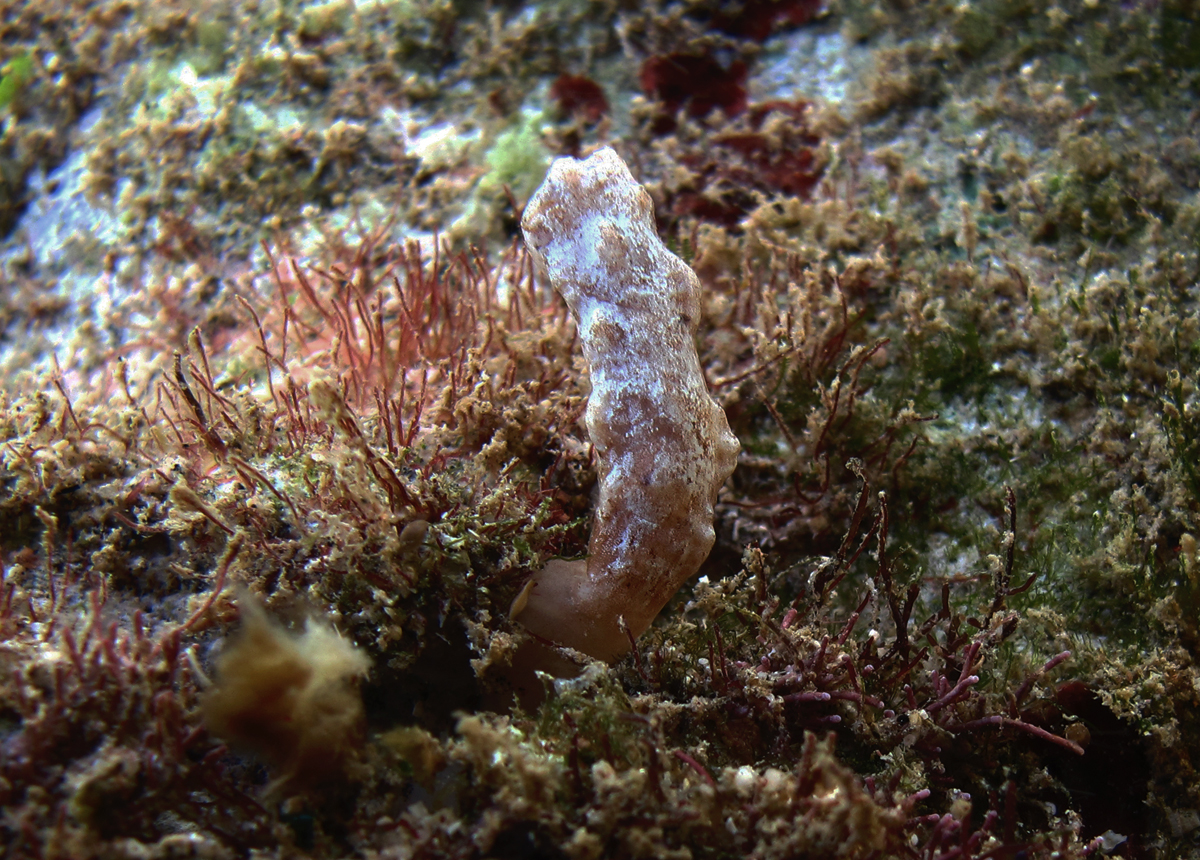
- Isaurus tuberculatus

Scientific classification
- Kingdom: Animalia
- Phylum: Cnidaria
- Subphylum: Anthozoa
- Class: Hexacorallia
- Order: Zoantharia
- Family: Zoanthidae
- Genus: Isaurus; Gray, 1828

= Isaurus =

Genus of Anthozoa

Isaurus is a genus of the cnidarian phylum within the family of Zoanthidae.

== Distribution ==
Commonly found in the outer edges and water-break zones of reefs around Belize and Fiji, but has been observed at sublittoral zones near Australia.

Isaurus cliftoni is known from Australia.

== Reproduction ==
Polyps tend to be solitary or in small clusters and tend to only open at night.

== Species ==
- Isaurus aggregatus Gray, 1828
- Isaurus clavatus Gray, 1828
- Isaurus cliftoni Gray, 1867

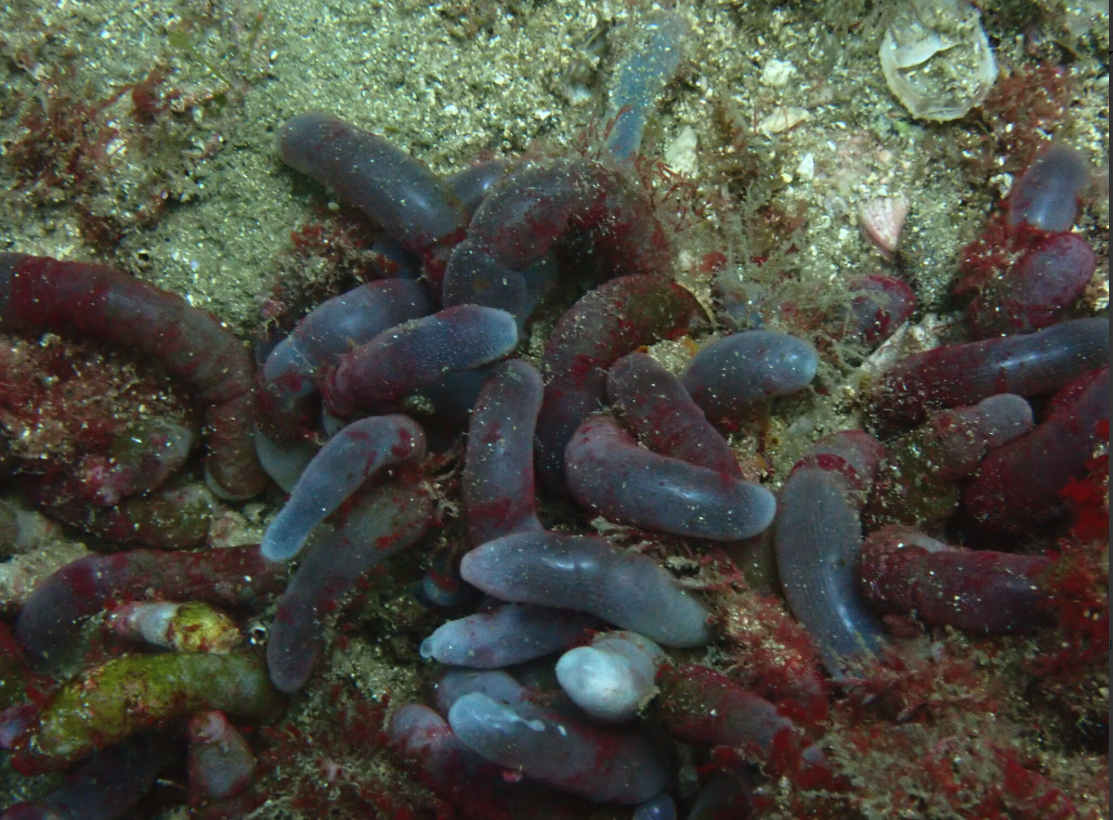
Isaurus cliftoni in Sydney, Australia

- Isaurus gelatinosus Pax, 1924
- Isaurus maculatus Muirhead & Ryland, 1985
- Isaurus natans Gray, 1828
- Isaurus savignii Gray, 1828
- Isaurus tuberculatus Gray, 1828
