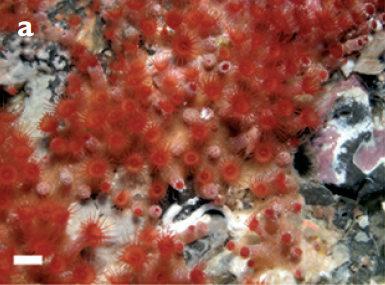
- Terrazoanthus onoi

Scientific classification
- Kingdom: Animalia
- Phylum: Cnidaria
- Subphylum: Anthozoa
- Class: Hexacorallia
- Order: Zoantharia
- Family: Hydrozoanthidae
- Genus: Terrazoanthus; Reimer & Fujii, 2010

= Terrazoanthus =

Genus of corals

Terrazoanthus is a genus of corals belonging to the family Hydrozoanthidae.

The species of this genus are found in the coasts of America, Africa and Japan.

Species:

- Terrazoanthus californicus (Carlgren, 1951)
- Terrazoanthus minutus (Duerden, 1898)
- Terrazoanthus onoi Reimer & Fujii, 2010
- Terrazoanthus patagonichus (Carlgren, 1898)
- Terrazoanthus sinnigeri Reimer & Fujii, 2010
