= Abyssoanthus =

Scientific classification
- Domain: Eukaryota
- Kingdom: Animalia
- Phylum: Cnidaria
- Class: Hexacorallia
- Order: Zoantharia
- Family: Abyssoanthidae; Reimer & Fujiwara in Reimer, Sinniger, Fujiwara, Hirano & Maruyama, 2007
- Genus: Abyssoanthus; Reimer & Fujiwara in Reimer, Sinniger, Fujiwara, Hirano & Maruyama, 2007

Genus of corals

Abyssoanthus is a genus of cnidarians, the only genus in the family Abyssoanthidae.

Species include:

- Abyssoanthus convallis Reimer & Sinniger, 2010
- Abyssoanthus nankaiensis Reimer & Fujiwara in Reimer, Sinniger, Fujiwara, Hirano & Maruyama, 2007
