= Norzoanthamine =

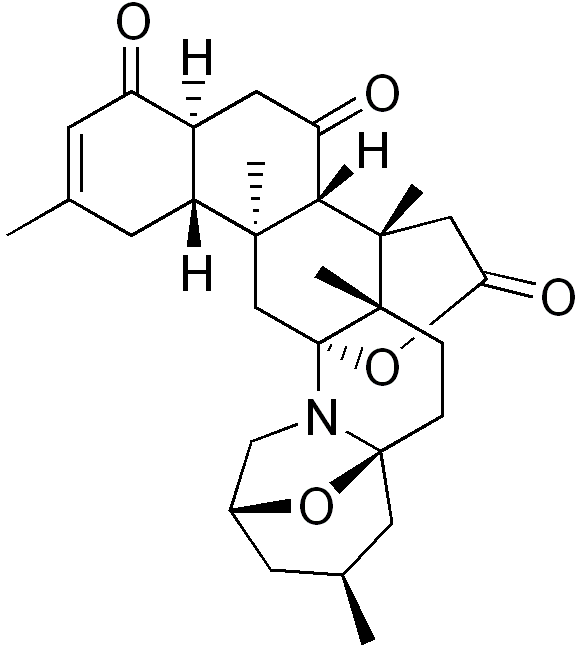

Names
- IUPAC name (4aS,6aS,7S,7aS,9aS,11S,13R,15aR,16aS,16bR)-1,4a,5,7,7a,8,9,11,12,13,14,16,16a,16b-Tetradecahydro-2,7,7a,11,16a-pentamethyl-4H,10H-9a,13-epoxy-15a,7-(epoxyethano)azepino[1,2-a]naphtho[2,1-g]quinoline-4,6,18(6aH)-trione
- Other names Norzoanthamine

Identifiers
CAS Number	164991-65-5
3D model (JSmol)	Interactive image
ChEMBL	ChEMBL3139348
ChemSpider	10220837
PubChem CID	10767108
UNII	JY698N4J6K
CompTox Dashboard (EPA)	DTXSID10893768
- InChI: InChI=1S/C29H39NO5/c1-16-9-20-19(21(31)10-16)11-22(32)24-25(20,3)15-29-27(5,26(24,4)13-23(33)35-29)6-7-28-12-17(2)8-18(34-28)14-30(28)29/h10,17-20,24H,6-9,11-15H2,1-5H3/t17-,18+,19-,20+,24-,25-,26-,27-,28-,29+/m0/s1 Key: RNNGFZNWONBXEI-JHPOJCJNSA-N; InChI=1/C29H39NO5/c1-16-9-20-19(21(31)10-16)11-22(32)24-25(20,3)15-29-27(5,26(24,4)13-23(33)35-29)6-7-28-12-17(2)8-18(34-28)14-30(28)29/h10,17-20,24H,6-9,11-15H2,1-5H3/t17-,18+,19-,20+,24-,25-,26-,27-,28-,29+/m0/s1 Key: RNNGFZNWONBXEI-JHPOJCJNBZ
- SMILES: O=C2C[C@@H]1C(=O)/C=C(/C)C[C@H]1[C@]3(C)C[C@]47OC(=O)C[C@@](C)([C@@H]23)[C@]7(C)CC[C@@]65C[C@@H](C)C[C@H](CN45)O6

Properties
Chemical formula	C_{29}H_{39}NO_{5}
Molar mass	481.633 g·mol^{−1}
- Except where otherwise noted, data are given for materials in their standard state (at 25 °C [77 °F], 100 kPa). verify (what is ?) Infobox references

Norzoanthamine is an alkaloid found in soft corals of the genus Zoanthus

Norzoanthamine has been shown to suppress the loss of bone weight and strength in mice. Some derivatives of norzoanthamine also suppress development of some kind of leukemia cell lines and human platelet aggregation.

A laboratory synthesis of this compound was developed in 2004.
