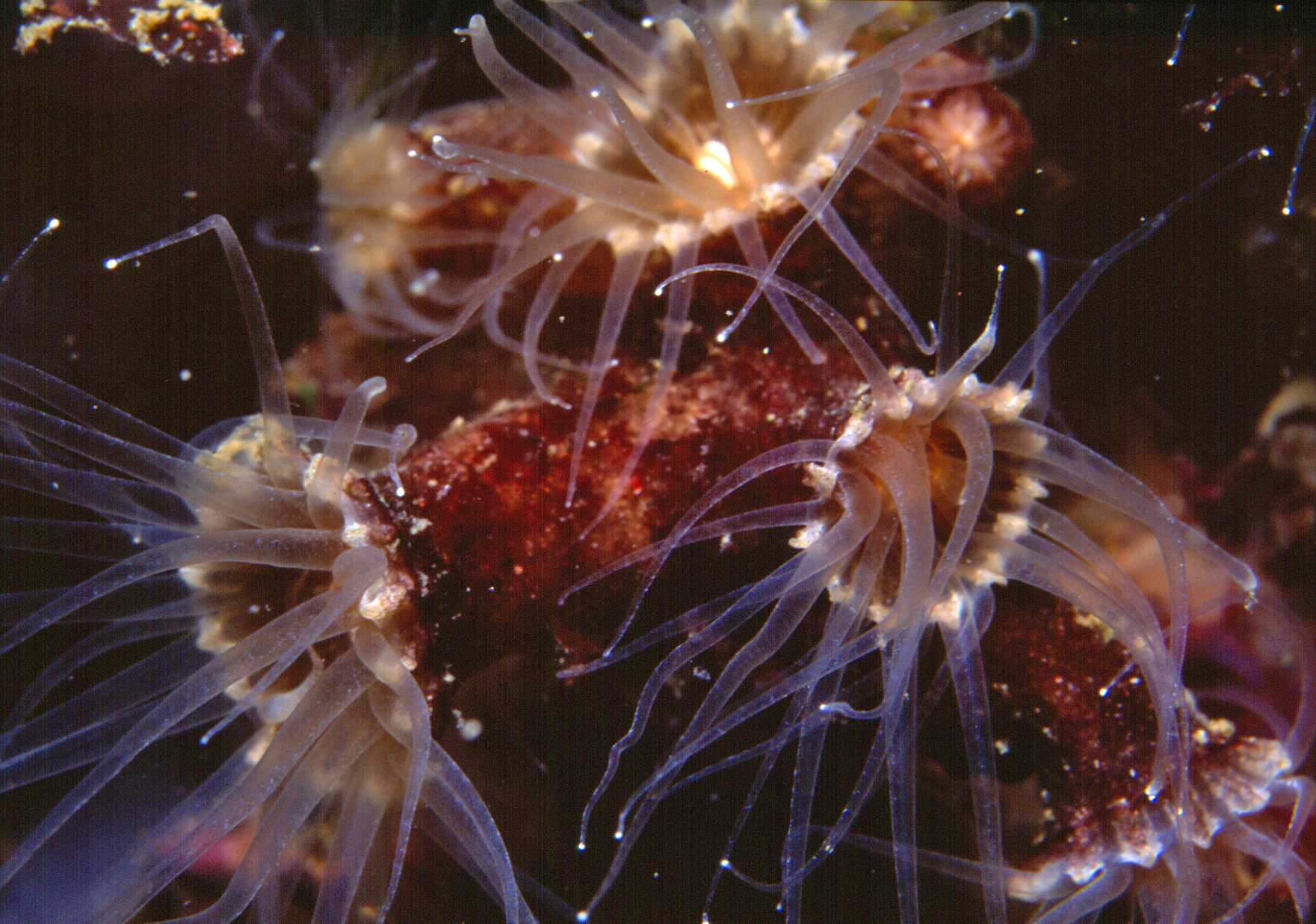
- Epizoanthus arenaceus, Banyuls-sur-Mer

Scientific classification
- Kingdom: Animalia
- Phylum: Cnidaria
- Subphylum: Anthozoa
- Class: Hexacorallia
- Order: Zoantharia
- Family: Epizoanthidae; Delage & Hérouard, 1901

= Epizoanthidae =

Family of sea anemones

Epizoanthidae is a family of cnidarians.

Genera include:

- Epizoanthus Gray, 1867
- Paleozoanthus Carlgren, 1924 - taxon inquirendum
- Thoracactis Gravier, 1918
