= Microzoanthus =

Scientific classification
- Kingdom: Animalia
- Phylum: Cnidaria
- Subphylum: Anthozoa
- Class: Hexacorallia
- Order: Zoantharia
- Suborder: Macrocnemina
- Family: Microzoanthidae; Fujii & Reimer, 2011
- Genus: Microzoanthus; Fujii & Reimer, 2011

Genus of cnidarians

Microzoanthus is a genus of cnidarians belonging to the monotypic family Microzoanthidae.

Species:

- Microzoanthus kagerou Fujii & Reimer, 2011
- Microzoanthus occultus Fujii & Reimer, 2011
