= Nanozoanthus =

Scientific classification
- Kingdom: Animalia
- Phylum: Cnidaria
- Subphylum: Anthozoa
- Class: Hexacorallia
- Order: Zoantharia
- Family: Nanozoanthidae; Fujii & Reimer, 2013
- Genus: Nanozoanthus; Fujii & Reimer, 2013
- Species: N. harenaceus

Binomial name
- Nanozoanthus harenaceus Fujii & Reimer, 2013

Genus of corals

Nanozoanthus is a monotypic genus of corals belonging to the monotypic family Nanozoanthidae. The only species is Nanozoanthus harenaceus.
