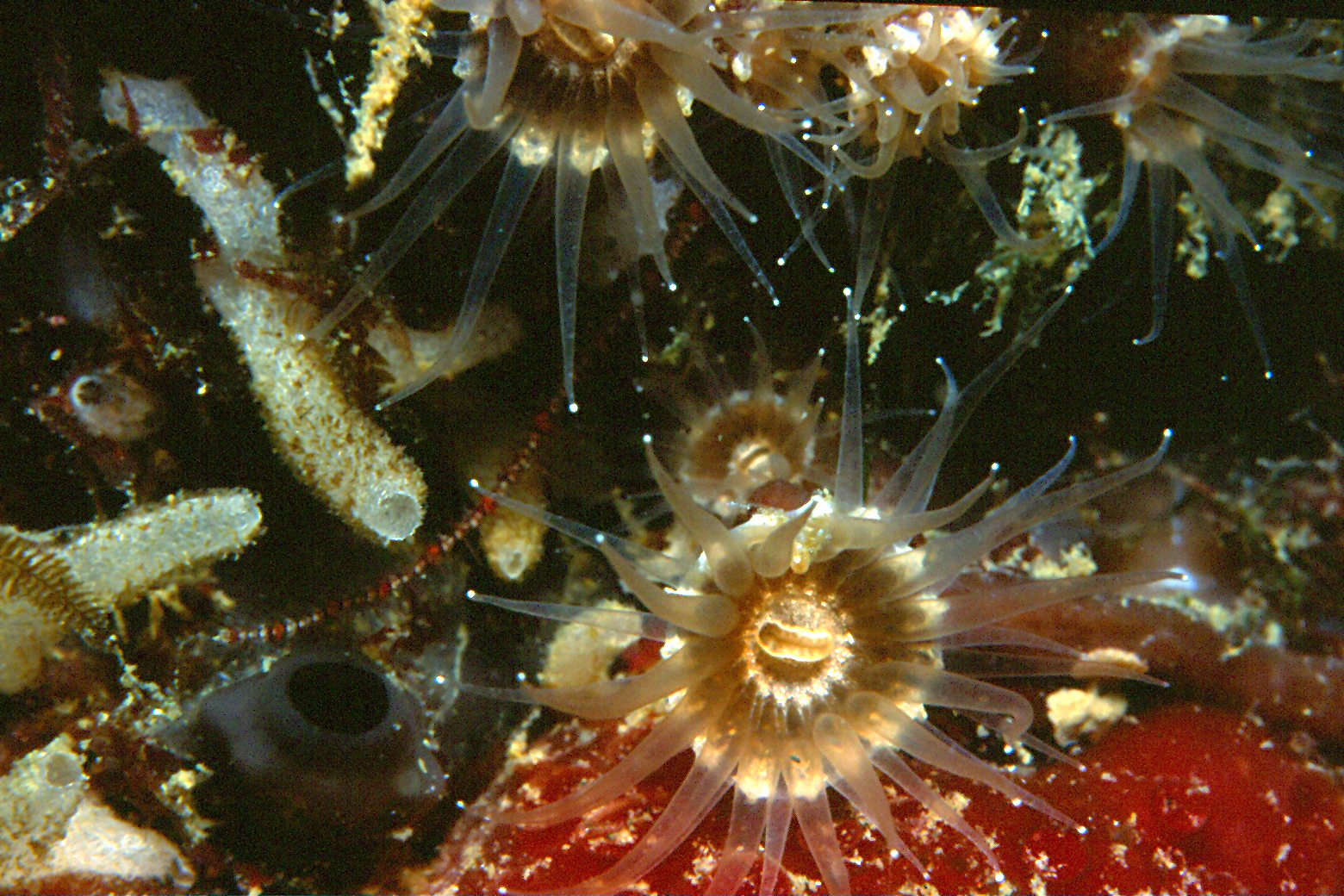
- Epizoanthus arenaceus

Scientific classification
- Kingdom: Animalia
- Phylum: Cnidaria
- Subphylum: Anthozoa
- Class: Hexacorallia
- Order: Zoantharia
- Family: Epizoanthidae
- Genus: Epizoanthus; Gray, 1867

= Epizoanthus =

Genus of corals

Epizoanthus is a genus of corals belonging to the family Epizoanthidae.

The genus has cosmopolitan distribution.

== Species ==
Species:

- Epizoanthus abyssorum Verrill, 1885
- Epizoanthus ameilictus Pax, 1952
- Epizoanthus amerimnus Pax, 1952
