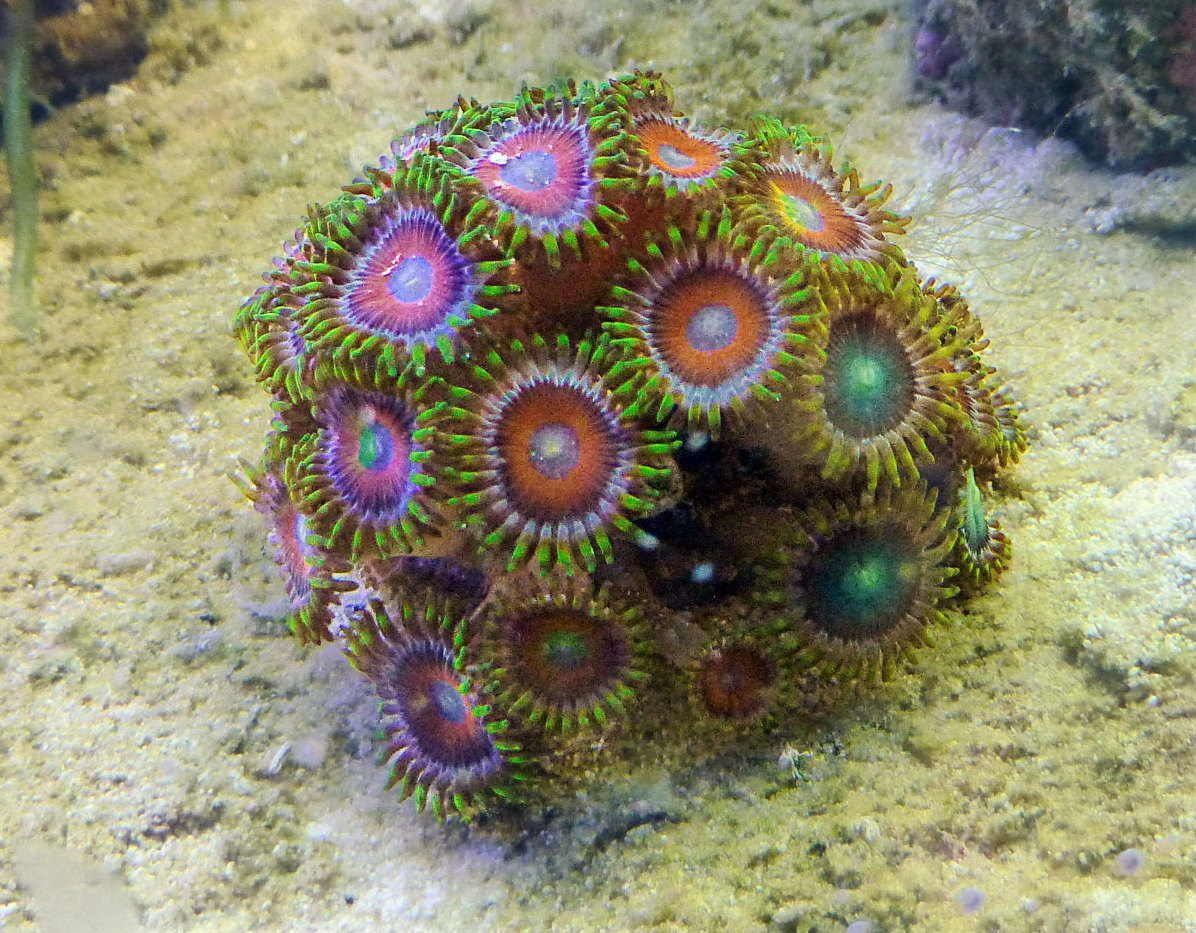
- Captive colony of an unidentified Zoanthus species

Scientific classification
- Kingdom: Animalia
- Phylum: Cnidaria
- Subphylum: Anthozoa
- Class: Hexacorallia
- Order: Zoantharia
- Family: Zoanthidae
- Genus: Zoanthus; Lamarck, 1801

= Zoanthus =

Genus of corals

Zoanthus is a genus of anthozoans in the family Zoanthidae. It is the type genus for its family and order.

== Species ==
The following species are recognized in the genus Zoanthus:

- Zoanthus coppingeri Haddon & Shackleton, 1891
- Zoanthus durbanensis Carlgren, 1938
- Zoanthus gigantus Reimer & Tsukahara in Reimer, Ono, Iwama, Takishita, Tsukahara & Maruyama, 2006
- Zoanthus kealakekuaensis Walsh & Bowers, 1971
- Zoanthus kuroshio Reimer & Ono in Reimer, Ono, Iwama, Takishita, Tsukahara & Maruyama, 2006
- Zoanthus mantoni (may be synonymous with Zoanthus coppingeri)
- Zoanthus natalensis Carlgren, 1938
- Zoanthus praelongus Carlgren, 1954
- Zoanthus pulchellus (Duchassaing & Michelotti, 1860)
- Zoanthus robustus Carlgren, 1950
- Zoanthus sansibaricus Carlgren, 1900
- Zoanthus sociatus (Ellis, 1768)
- Zoanthus solanderi Le Sueur, 1818
- Zoanthus vietnamensis Pax & Müller, 1957

== Aquaria ==
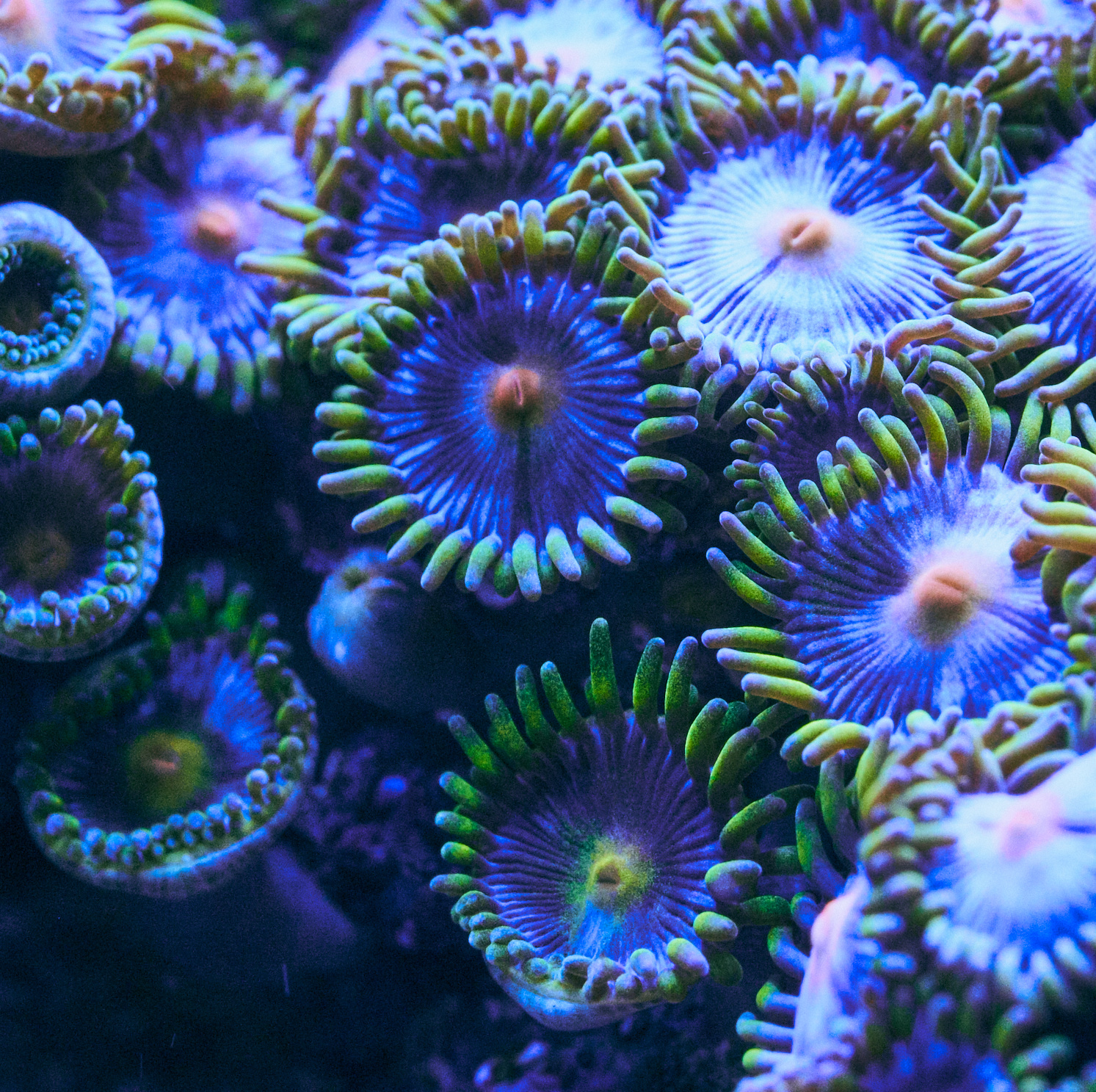

Zoanthids are prized in the aquarium hobby, being relatively easy to raise and very colorful. Known as "button polyps" or "zoas" they can spread to completely cover a rock with brightly colored circular patterns. It also exhibits proteins similar to green fluorescent protein.

== See also ==
- Norzoanthamine
