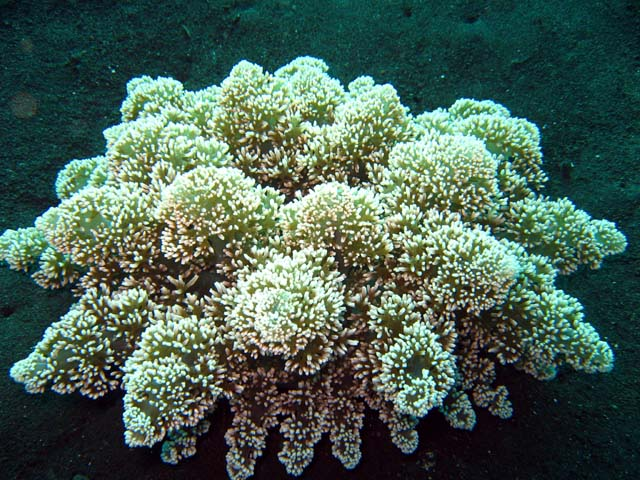
- Actinodendron arboretum is one of the species in this family

Scientific classification
- Kingdom: Animalia
- Phylum: Cnidaria
- Subphylum: Anthozoa
- Class: Hexacorallia
- Order: Actiniaria
- Superfamily: Actinioidea
- Family: Actinodendridae; Haddon, 1898

Synonyms
- Actinodendronidae

= Actinodendridae =

Family of sea anemones

Actinodendridae is a family of cnidarians belonging to the order Actiniaria.

Genera:

- Actinodendron Quoy & Gaimard, 1830
- Actinodendron de Blainville, 1830
- Actinostephanus Kwietniewski, 1897
- Megalactis Hemprich & Ehrenberg, 1834
