= Intracellular digestion =

Breakdown of substances in a cell

Process of how macroautophagy works

Every organism requires energy to be active. However, to obtain energy from its outside environment, cells must not only retrieve molecules from their surroundings but also break them down. This process is known as intracellular digestion. In its broadest sense, intracellular digestion is the breakdown of substances within the cytoplasm of a cell. In detail, a phagocyte's duty is obtaining food particles and digesting it in a vacuole. For example, following phagocytosis, the ingested particle (or phagosome) fuses with a lysosome containing hydrolytic enzymes to form a phagolysosome; the pathogens or food particles within the phagosome are then digested by the lysosome's enzymes.

Intracellular digestion can also refer to the process in which animals that lack a digestive tract bring food items into the cell for the purposes of digestion for nutritional needs. This kind of intracellular digestion occurs in many unicellular protozoans, in Pycnogonida, in some molluscs, Cnidaria and Porifera. There is another type of digestion, called extracellular digestion. In amphioxus, digestion is both extracellular and intracellular.

== Function ==
Intracellular digestion is divided into heterophagic digestion and autophagic digestion. These two types take place in the lysosome and they both have very specific functions. Heterophagic intracellular digestion has an important job which is to break down all molecules that are brought into a cell by endocytosis. The degraded molecules need to be delivered to the cytoplasm; however, this will not be possible if the molecules are not hydrolyzed in the lysosome. Autophagic intracellular digestion is processed in the cell, which means it digests the internal molecules.

Functions of autophagy

== Autophagy ==
Generally, autophagy includes three small branches, which are macroautophagy, microautophagy, and chaperone-mediated autophagy.

== Occurrence ==
Most organisms that use intracellular digestion belong to Kingdom Protista, such as amoeba and paramecium.

Amoeba : Amoeba uses pseudopodia to capture food for nutrition in a process called phagocytosis.

Paramecium : Paramecium uses cilia in the oral groove to bring food into the mouth pore which goes to the gullet. At the end of the gullet, a food vacuole forms. Undigested food is carried to the anal pore.

Euglena : Euglena is photosynthetic but also engulfs and digests microorganisms.

Some members of Kingdom Animalia also shows intracellular digestion, such as organisms of phylum Porifera. They use choanocytes (collar cells) to trap food particles from water.
