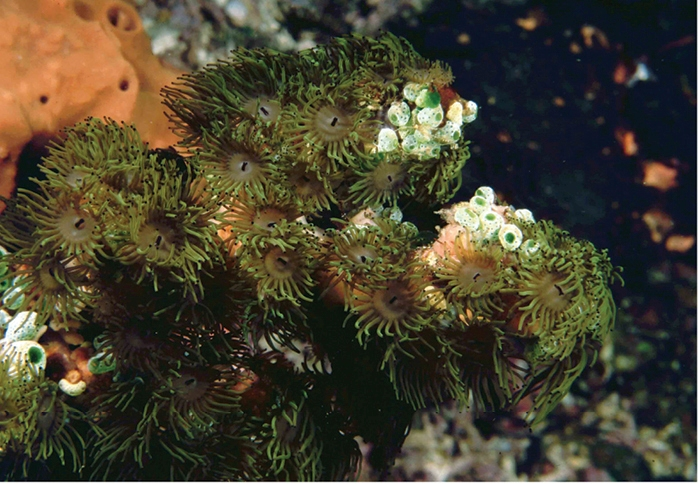

Scientific classification
- Kingdom: Animalia
- Phylum: Cnidaria
- Subphylum: Anthozoa
- Class: Hexacorallia
- Order: Zoantharia
- Family: Zoanthidae
- Genus: Acrozoanthus; Saville-Kent, 1893
- Species: A. australiae

Binomial name
- Acrozoanthus australiae Saville-Kent, 1893

= Acrozoanthus =

Genus of corals

Acrozoanthus is a monototypic genus of soft coral, anthozoans in the family Zoanthidae. It is represented by a single species, Acrozoanthus australiae, which is also known by the common names stick polyp, tree stick polyp, tree anemone, and encrusting stick anemone.
