= Extracellular digestion =

Biological process

Extracellular heterotrophic digestion is a process in which saprobionts feed by secreting enzymes through the cell membrane onto the food. The enzymes catalyze the digestion of the food, i.e., diffusion, transport, osmotrophy or phagocytosis. Since digestion occurs outside the cell, it is said to be extracellular. It takes place either in the lumen of the digestive system, in a gastric cavity or other digestive organ, or completely outside the body. During extracellular digestion, food is broken down outside the cell either mechanically or with acid by special molecules called enzymes. Then the newly broken down nutrients can be absorbed by the cells nearby. Humans use extracellular digestion when they eat. Their teeth grind the food up, enzymes and acid in the stomach liquefy it, and additional enzymes in the small intestine break the food down into parts their cells can use. Extracellular digestion is a form of digestion found in all saprobiontic annelids, crustaceans, arthropods, lichens and chordates, including vertebrates.

== In fungi ==
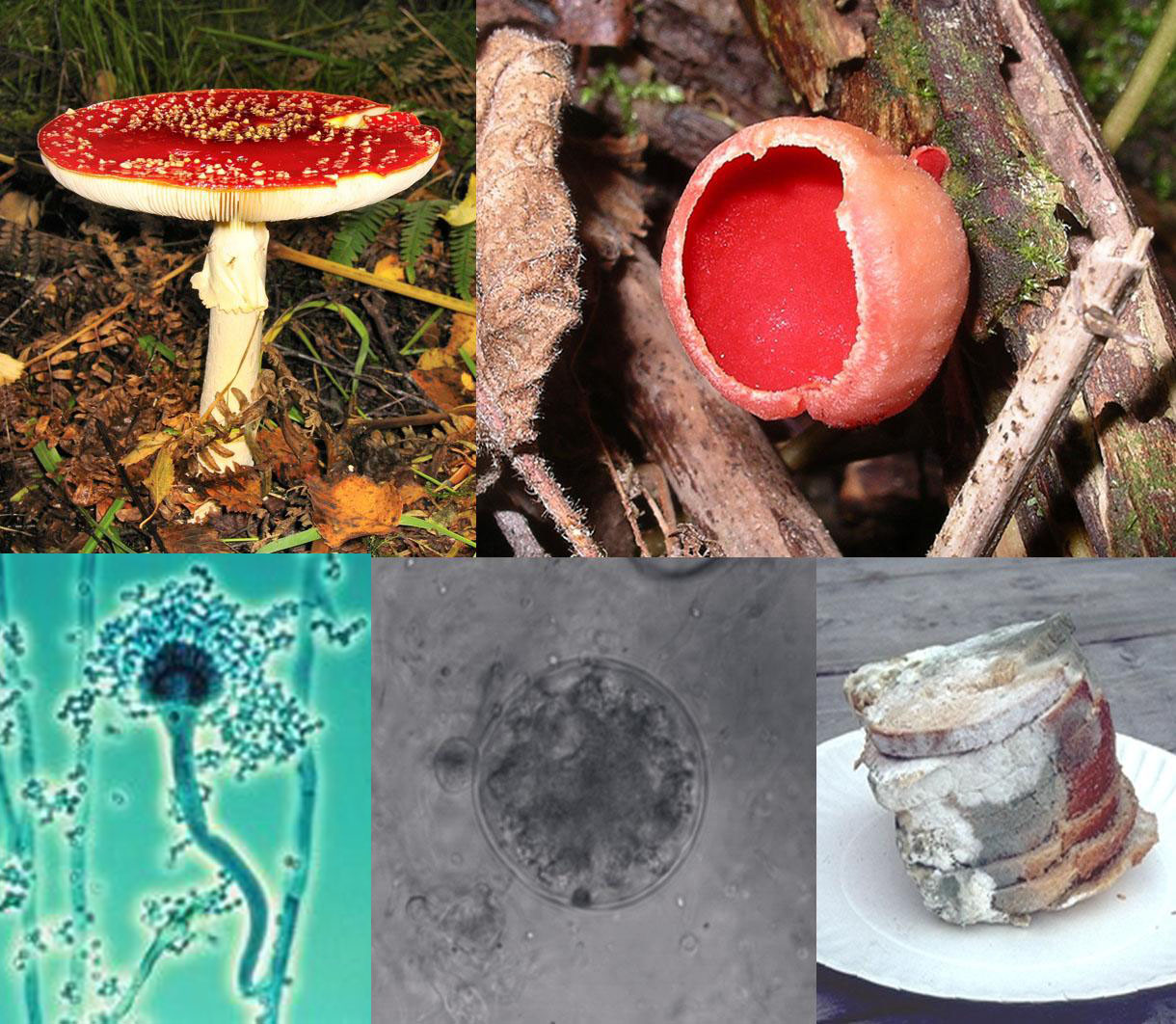
Fungi collage

Fungi are heterotrophic organisms. Heterotrophic nutrition means that fungi utilize extracellular sources of organic energy, organic material or organic matter, for their maintenance, growth and reproduction. Energy is derived from the breakdown of the chemical bond between carbon and either carbon or other components of compounds such as a phosphate ion. The extracellular sources of energy may be simple sugars, polypeptides or more complex carbohydrate.

Fungi can only absorb small molecules through their walls. For fungi to gain their energy needs, they find and absorb organic molecules appropriate to their needs, either immediately or following some form of enzyme diminution outside the thallus. The small molecules are then absorbed, used directly or reconstituted (transformed) into organic molecules within the cell.

When a skeletonized leaf is seen in the litter, it is because recalcitrant materials remain and digestion is continuing. The fungi that utilize a variety of energy sources usually absorb the simplest compounds first, then the more complex. For instance, the formation of cellulose is repressed by high concentrations of glucose in the cytoplasm. On depletion of primary sources of glucose, enzymes to degrade more complex molecules such as cellulose and starch, are then released. Thus soluble sugars and amino acids are removed first from a leaf released from a tree. Starch is then broken down and absorbed. Subsequently, pectin and cellulose are digested. Finally, waxes are degraded and lignin oxidized. The staggering of energy acquisition results in the efficient utilization of available energy.

== Detection of digestive enzymes in fungi ==
The regulation of nutrient acquisition appears to be controlled by general phenomena. Only a small group of enzymes, mostly hydrolases, can be detected in the culture filtrate of well-fed fungi. This suggests that specific inducers control the manufacture and release of enzymes for degradation. The most common complex carbohydrate available in the environment is cellulose. In the absence of glucose, detection of cellulose, for instance, induces the expression of celluloses. As a consequence, fungi specifically target the breakdown of the cellulose in their environment, and do not waste energy on the unnecessary formation of enzymes for degradation of molecules that may not be present. Fungi have an efficient process to gain energy.

Because of the huge range of potential food sources, fungi have evolved enzymes suitable for the environments in which they are usually found. The range of enzymes, though wide in many species, is not sufficient for survival in all environments. Fungi require other competitive attributes to ensure continued survival.

The opposite is also true. Some fungi have highly specific metabolic capabilities which enable occupation of specific habitats, utilizing molecules which are unavailable to other fungi. Further, utilization of a common and abundant substrate has led many fungi to evolve a range of highly specific degradative enzymes. Among the fungi are species that are generalist in their nutrient requirements, some that have specific nutrient requirements, and many that are in between.

== Excretion of digestive enzymes ==
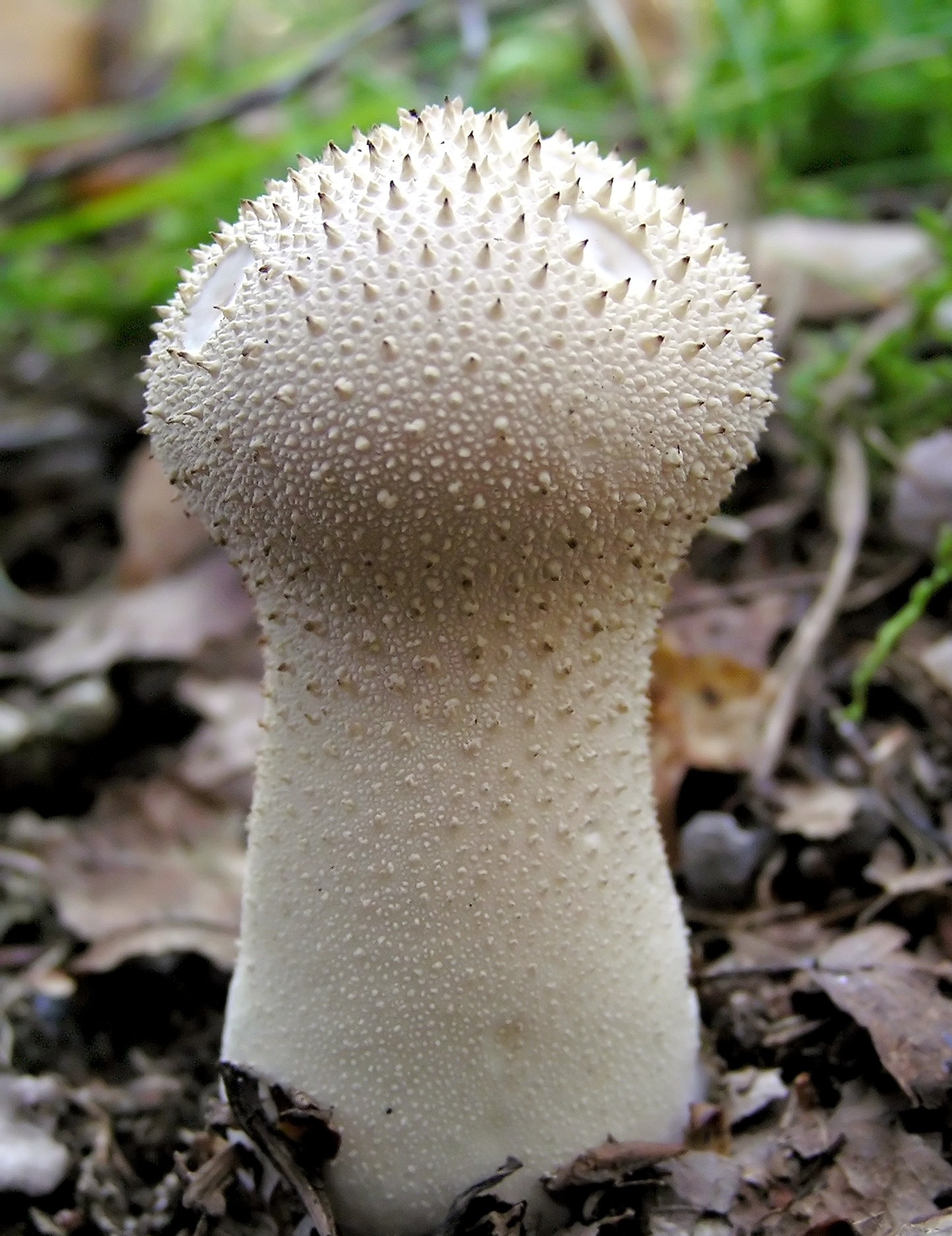
Lycoperdon perlatum

Enzymes are manufactured close to the hyphal tip. Some are packaged in vesicles associated with the Golgi and then delivered to the hyphal tip. The contents are released at the tip. Some enzymes are actively excreted through the plasma membrane, where they diffuse through or act in the cell wall. Note that the enzymes released from the hyphal tip require an aqueous environment for release and subsequent degradative activity.

=== Absorption of digested products ===
The molecules absorbed through the plasma membrane tend to be smaller than 5,000 Da, so only simple sugars, amino acids, fatty acids and other small molecules can be taken up following digestion. The molecules are taken up in solution. In some cases, the molecules are processed by enzymes located within the cell wall. For instance, sucrose inverters have been localized in walls of yeasts. Glucose appears to be the sugar preferred by most fungi. Uptake of other sugars is repressed when glucose is available. Similarly, ammonium, glutamine and asparagine regulate the uptake of nitrogen compounds, and cysteine of sulphur compounds.

== Joint intracellular and extracellular digestion in cnidarians ==
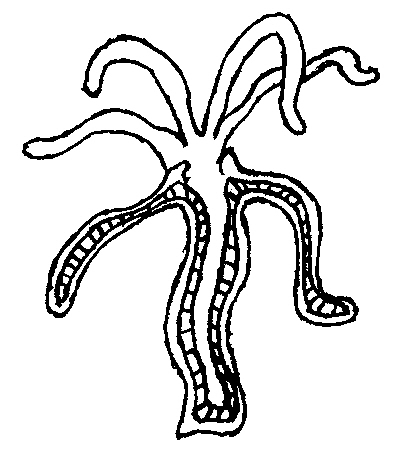
Cnidarian polyp

In hydra and other cnidarians, the food is caught by the tentacles and ingested through the mouth into the single large digestive cavity, the gastrovascular cavity. Enzymes are secreted from the cells bordering this cavity and poured on the food for extracellular digestion. Small particles of the partially digested food are engulfed into the vacuoles of the digestive cells for intracellular digestion. Any undigested and un-absorbed food is finally thrown out of the mouth.

== Invert digestive systems are bags and tubes ==
Single-celled organisms as well as sponges digest their food intracellularly. Other multi-cellular organisms digest their food extracellularly, within a digestive cavity. In this case the digestive enzymes are released into a cavity that is continuous with the animal's external environment. In cnidarians and in flatworms such as planarians, the digestive cavity, called a gastrovascular cavity, has only one opening that serves as both mouth and anus. There is no specialization within this type of digestive system because every cell is exposed to all stages of food digestion.

Specializing occurs when the digestive tract or alimentary canal has a separate mouth and anus so that transport of food is one-way. The most primitive digestive tract is seen in nematodes (phylum Nematode), where it is simply a tubular gut lined by an epithelial membrane. Earthworms (phylum Annelids) have a digestive tract specialized in different regions for the ingestion, storage, fragmentation, digestion and absorption of food. All more complex animal groups, including all vertebrates, show similar specializations.

The ingested food may be stored in a specialized region of the digestive tract or subjected to physical fragmentation. This fragmentation may occur through the chewing action of teeth (in the mouth of many vertebrates) or the grinding action of pebbles (in the gizzard of earthworms and birds). Chemical digestion then occurs, breaking down the larger food molecules of polysaccharides and disaccharides, fats, and proteins into their smallest sub-units.

Chemical digestion involves hydrolysis reactions that liberate the sub unit molecules—primarily monosaccharides, amino acids and fatty acids—from the food. These products of chemical digestion pass through the epithelial lining of the gut into the blood, in a process known as absorption. Any molecules in the food that are not absorbed cannot be used by the animal. These waste products are excreted, or defecated from the anus.

== Extracellular digestion in other animals ==
=== Annelids ===
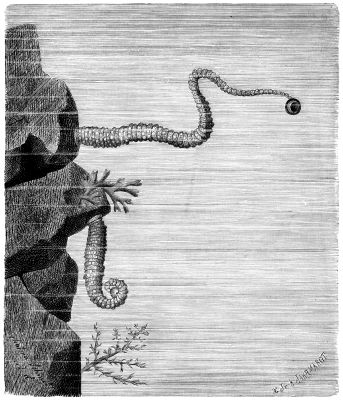
A piscicolid leech

The echiuran gut is long and highly convoluted, and there is no gut in pogonophoran adults. Among other annelids, the gut is linear and unsegmented, with a mouth opening on the peristomium and an anus opening at the posterior end of the animal (pygidium). Food is moved through the gut by cilia and/or by muscular contractions. Digestion is primarily extracellular, although some species show an intracellular component as well.

=== Arthropods ===
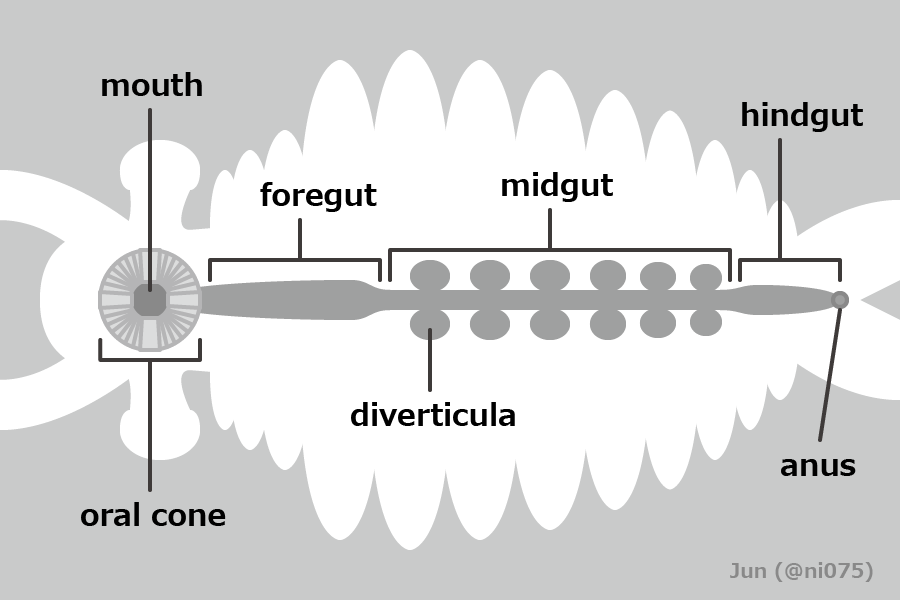
Radiodonta digestive system.

The arthropod digestive system is divisible into three areas: the fore gut, mid gut, and hind gut. All free-living species exhibit a distinct and separate mouth and anus, and in all species, food must be moved through the digestive tract by muscular activity rather than cilia activity since the lumen of the fore gut and hind gut is lined with cuticle. Digestion is generally extracellular. Nutrients are distributed to the tissues through the hemal system.

=== Molluscs ===
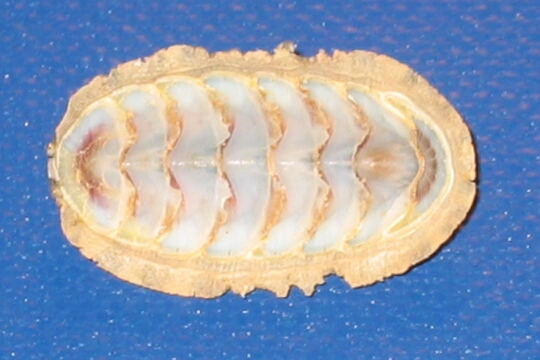
Bottom view of a chiton

Most molluscs have a complete digestive system with a separate mouth and anus. The mouth leads into a short esophagus which leads to a stomach. Associated with the stomach are one or more digestive glands or digestive caeca. Digestive enzymes are secreted into the lumen of these glands. Additional extracellular digestion takes place in the stomach. In cephalopods, digestion is entirely extracellular. In the most other mollusks, the terminal stages of digestion are completed intracellularly, within the tissue of the digestive glands. The absorbed nutrients enter the circulatory system for distribution throughout the body or are stored in the digestive glands for later use. Undigested waste pass through an intestine and out through the anus. Other aspects of food collection and processing have already been discussed where appropriate for each group.

=== Humans ===
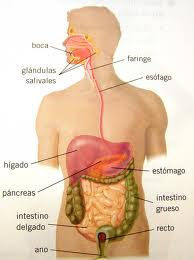
Extracellular digestion in humans occurs from the mouth to the stomach

The initial components of the gastrointestinal tract are the mouth and the pharynx, which is the common passage of the oral and nasal cavities. The pharynx leads to the esophagus, a muscular tube that delivers food to the stomach, where some preliminary digestion occurs; here, the digestion is extracellular.

From the stomach, food passes to the small intestine, where a battery of digestive enzymes continue the digestive process. The products of digestion are absorbed across the wall of the intestine into the bloodstream. What remains is emptied into the large intestine, where some of the remaining water and minerals are absorbed; here the digestion is intracellular.

== See also ==
- Saprotrophic nutrition
