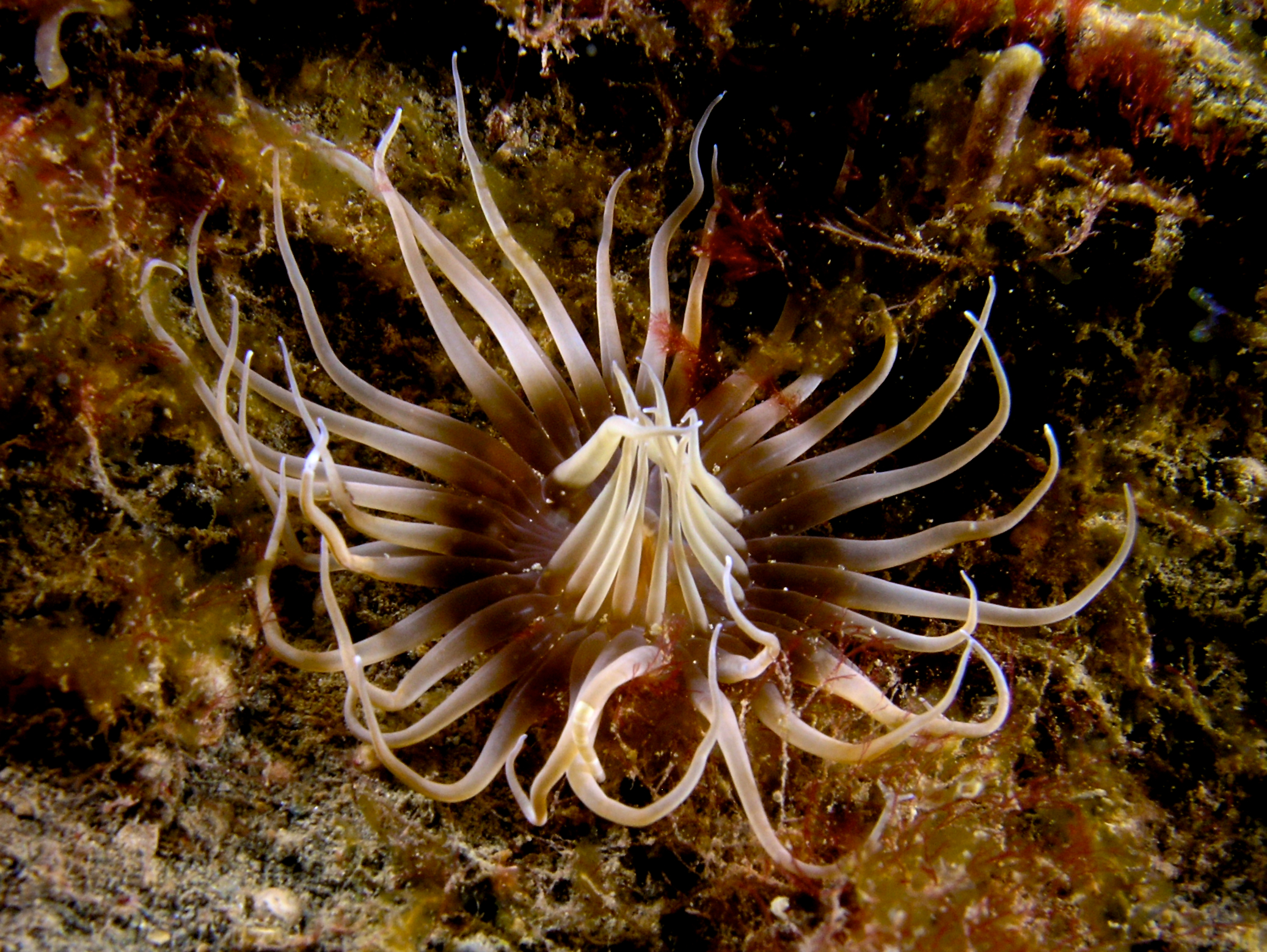

Scientific classification
- Kingdom: Animalia
- Phylum: Cnidaria
- Subphylum: Anthozoa
- Class: Hexacorallia
- Order: Actiniaria
- Family: Actinodendridae
- Genus: Actinostephanus; Kwietniewski, 1897
- Species: A. haeckeli

Binomial name
- Actinostephanus haeckeli Kwietniewski, 1897

= Actinostephanus haeckeli =

Species of sea anemone

Actinostephanus haeckeli, also known as the sea snake anemone or Haeckel's sea anemone, is a species of sea anemone in the family Actinodendridae.

== Environment ==
Actinostephanus haeckeli mainly inhabits sandy bottoms, lagoons and bays. A. haeckeli can completely retreat into the sand in the sandy low-tide areas it mainly inhabits.

== Description ==
Actinostephanus haeckeli is 10 to 12 cm in diameter and has 12 long, cylindrical, uniformly dark brown tentacles that taper at the tips. Its body column is short, smooth, and covered with regular stripes, becoming paler toward the base.
