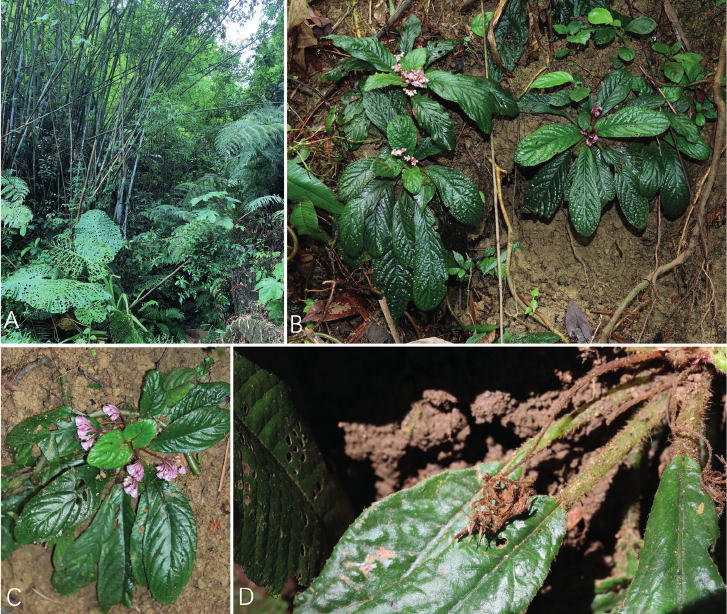

Scientific classification
- Kingdom: Plantae
- Clade: Tracheophytes
- Clade: Angiosperms
- Clade: Eudicots
- Clade: Asterids
- Order: Lamiales
- Family: Gesneriaceae
- Tribe: Trichosporeae
- Subtribe: Leptoboeinae
- Genus: Skogea; U.B.Deshmukh
- Species: S. enpingensis

Binomial name
- Skogea enpingensis (F.Wen, Y.G.Wei & Z.B.Xin) U.B.Deshmukh

Synonyms
- Actinostephanus F.Wen, Y.G.Wei & L.F.Fu (2022), non Actinostephanos Khursevich (1989).; Radiaticorollarus Y.G.Wei, F.Wen & Lei Cai, nom. superfl.; Actinostephanus enpingensis F.Wen, Y.G.Wei & Z.B.Xin; Radiaticorollarus enpingensis (F.Wen, Y.G.Wei & Z.B.Xin) F.Wen, Y.G.Wei & Lei Cai

= Skogea =

Genus of flowering plants

Skogea is a monotypic genus of perennial herbs in the family Gesneriaceae. The sole species in the genus is Skogea enpingensis, which is endemic to the lowlands of Enping county in Guangdong Province of southeastern China.

The species was first described as Actinostephanus enpingensis in 2022, and placed in the newly-described monotypic genus Actinostephanus. The genus name comes from "Actino-" from Greek ἀκτῑ́ς (aktῑ́s), which means ray or beam; and "-stephanus" from the Greek Στέφανος (Stéphanos) which means crown, which is related to ᾰ̓́νθoς (ánthos), meaning flower, blossom, or bloom. This alludes to the actinoform corolla that characterize the genus and species. The nomenclature committee for algae recommended treating Actinostephanus as a later homonym of the diatom genus Actinostephanos Khursevich, and in 2024 Umakant B. Deshmukh proposed Skogea as a replacement name for the genus.
