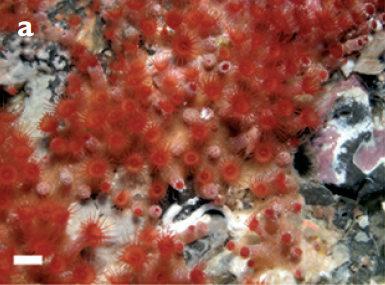
- A colony of zoanthid Terrazoanthus onoi

Scientific classification
- Kingdom: Animalia
- Phylum: Cnidaria
- Subphylum: Anthozoa
- Class: Hexacorallia
- Order: Zoantharia
- Suborder: Macrocnemina
- Family: Hydrozoanthidae

= Hydrozoanthidae =

Family of corals

Hydrozoanthidae is a family of cnidarians belonging to the order Zoantharia.

Genera:

- Aenigmanthus Kise, Maeda & Reimer, 2019
- Hydrozoanthus Sinniger, Reimer & Pawlowski, 2010
- Terrazoanthus Reimer & Fujii, 2010
