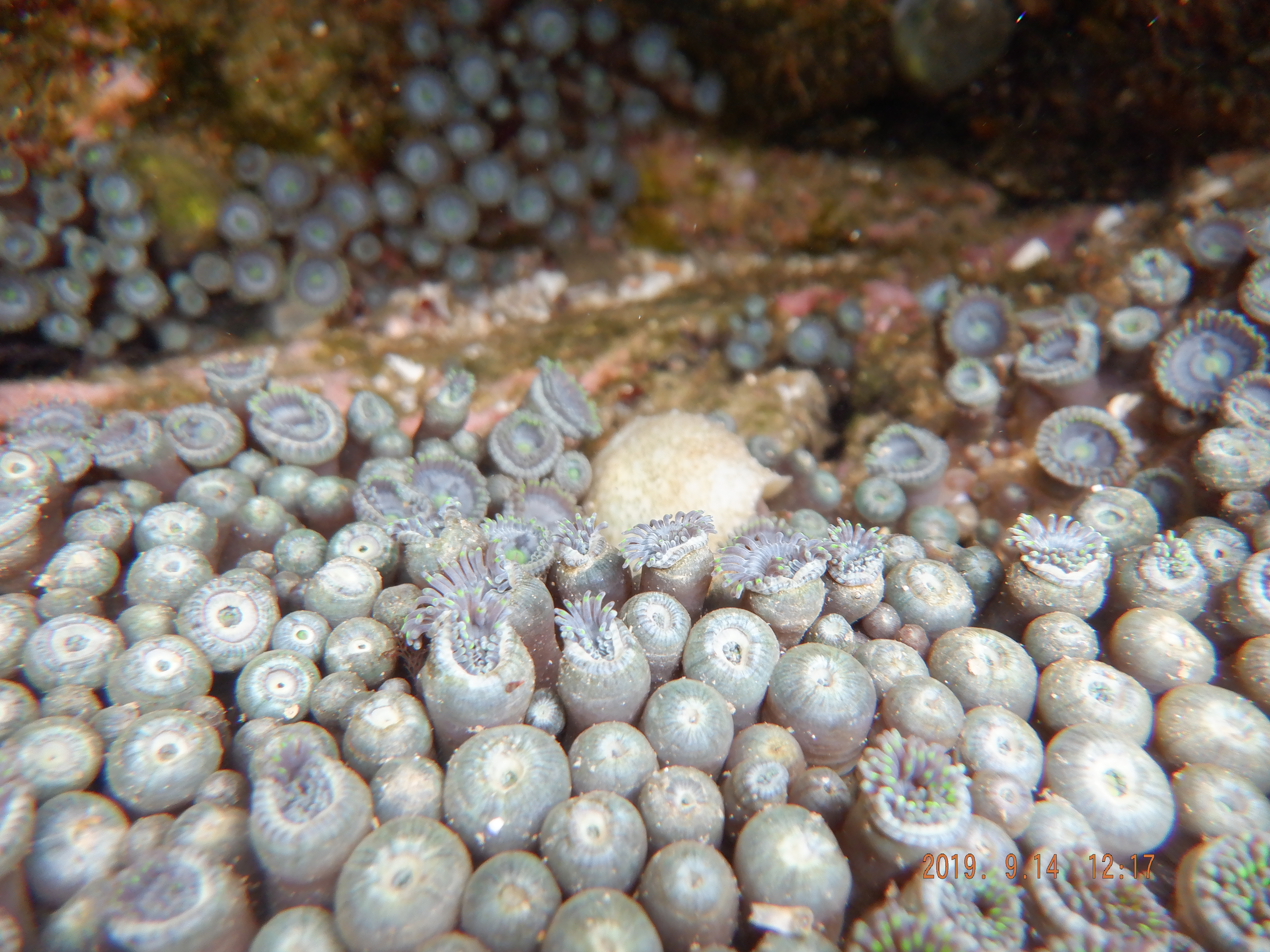
- Zoanthus sansibaricus

Scientific classification
- Kingdom: Animalia
- Phylum: Cnidaria
- Subphylum: Anthozoa
- Class: Hexacorallia
- Order: Zoantharia
- Family: Zoanthidae; Rafinesque, 1815

= Zoanthidae =

Family of corals

Zoanthidae is a family of cnidarians.

Genera include:

- Acrozoanthus Saville-Kent, 1893
- Isaurus Gray, 1828
- Zoanthus Cuvier, 1800
