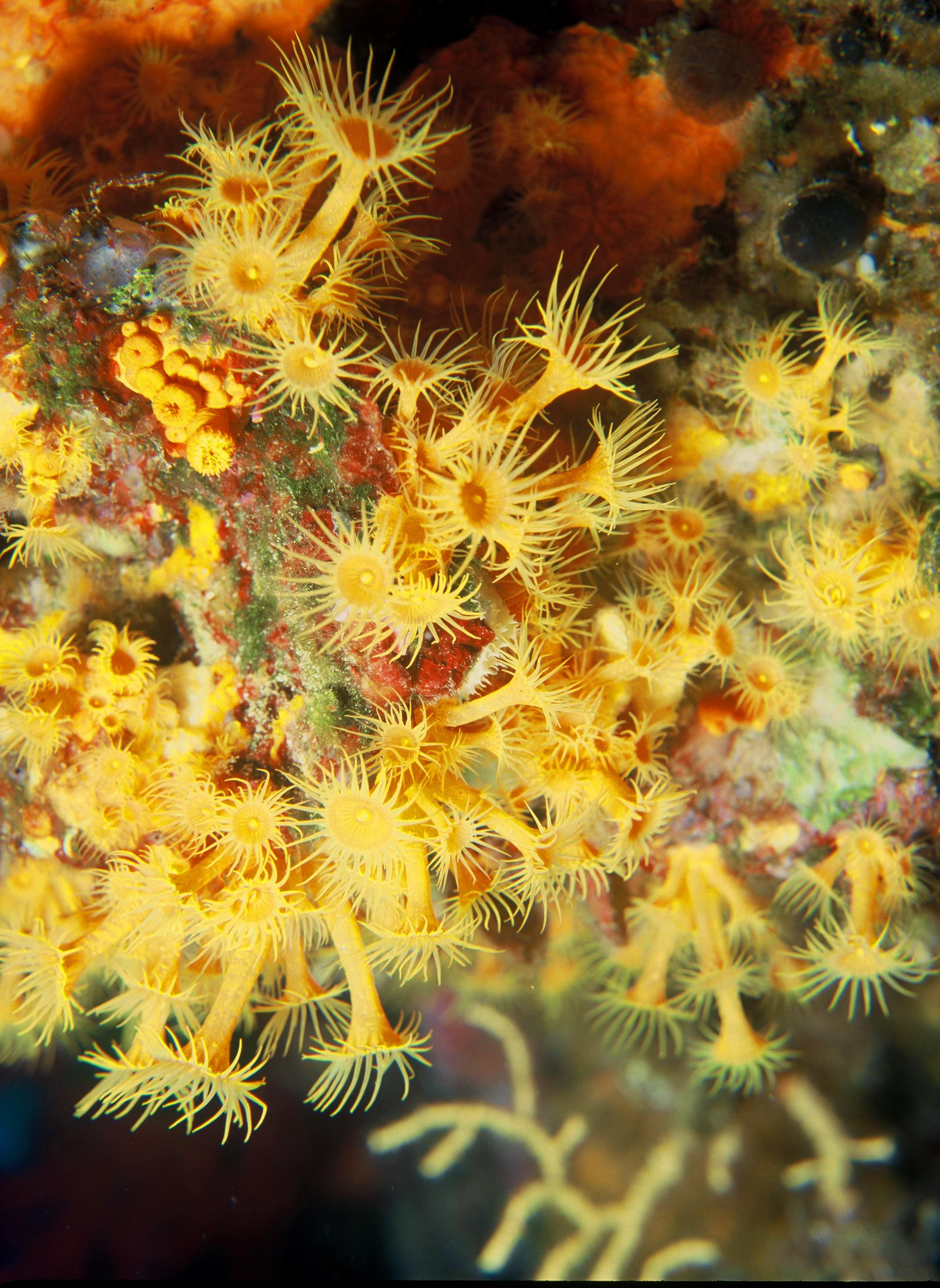
- Parazoanthus axinellae

Scientific classification
- Kingdom: Animalia
- Phylum: Cnidaria
- Subphylum: Anthozoa
- Class: Hexacorallia
- Order: Zoantharia

= Zoantharia =

Zoanthids

Order of cnidarians

Zoanthids are an order of hexacorals. They are also often referred to as zoanthiniarians, zoantharians (proper), colonial anemones, button polyps and scientifically as Zoanthiniaria, Zoanthinaria, Zoantharia, Zoanthidea, Zoanthidia, Zoantharida.

Zoanthids are commonly found in coral reefs, the deep sea and many other marine environments around the world. This includes many tropical and subtropical ecosystems. These animals come in a variety of different colonizing formations and in numerous different colors. They can be found as individual polyps, attached by a fleshy stolon or a mat that can be created from small pieces of sediment, sand and rock. They are known to reproduce asexually and to produce marine toxins. The term "zoanthid" refers to all animals within this order Zoantharia, and should not be confused with "Zoanthus", which is one genus within Zoantharia.

These are among the most commonly collected cnidarians in reef aquaria, as they are easily propagating, very durable in many water conditions, and play a very important role in their natural ecosystems.

== Other use of the name Zoantharia ==
The name Zoantharia (but not the above mentioned variants of this name) is often used as a synonym of Hexacorallia, i. e. in a much broader sense than in this article.

== Characteristics ==
Zoanthids can be distinguished from other colonial anthozoans and soft coral by their characteristic of incorporating sand and other small pieces of material into their tissue to help make their structure (except for the family Zoanthidae). They also have high morphological plasticity, allowing them to change their relative shape to fit their environment. The order also possesses tentacles that are all marginal, further differentiating them from other marine organisms.

Many zoanthids (in particular the genera Epizoanthus and Parazoanthus) are often found growing on other marine invertebrates, such as reef building coral and sponges, either only on their body or their branches. Most of the species propagate asexually and the offspring of the original polyp remain connected to each other, by a stolonal network or coenosarc. Although, some species are solitary.

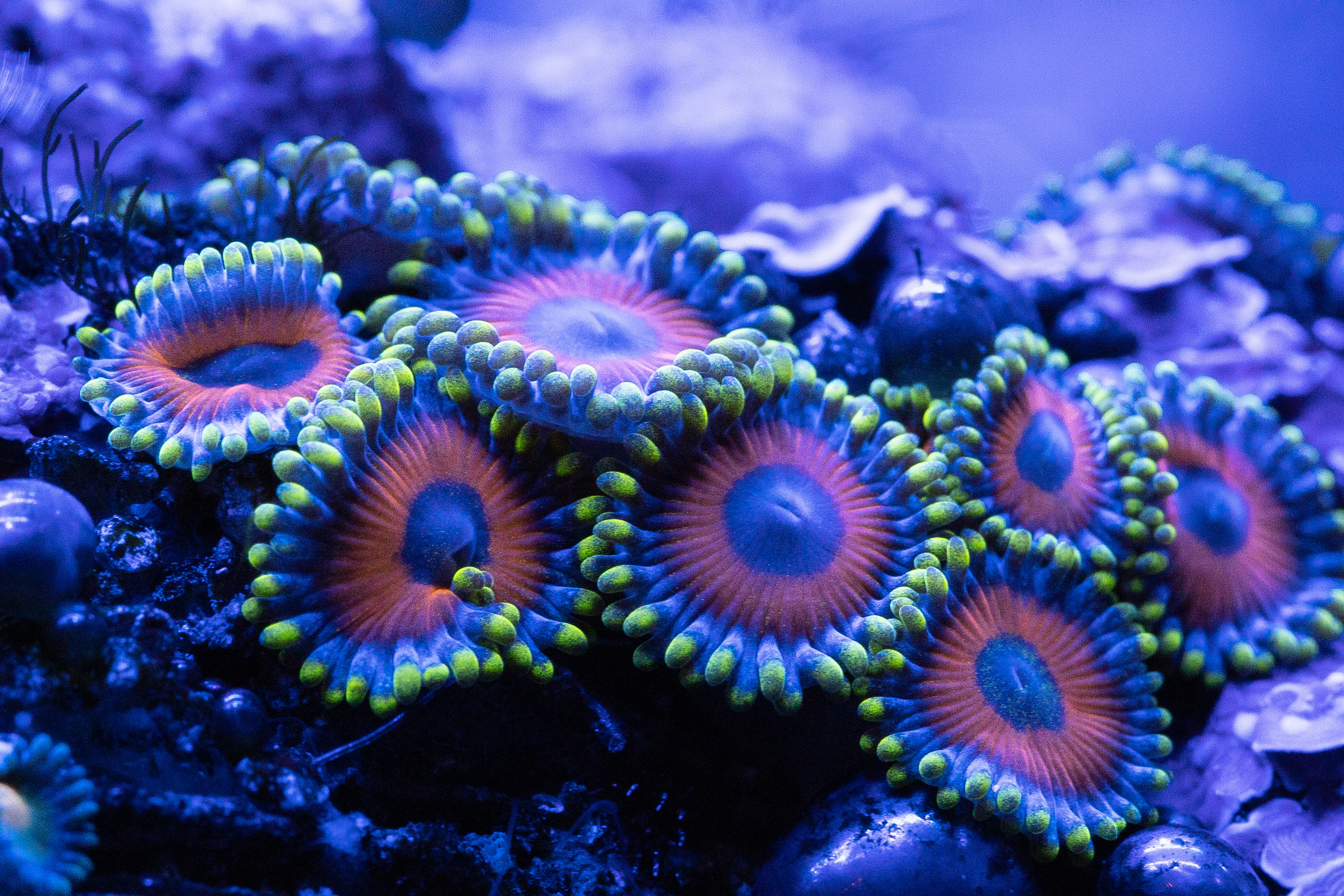
The eagle eye strain of zoanthids with bright colors with some differentiation under ultraviolet light.

These characteristics including structure, asexual reproduction, rapid growth, and generalist speciation, allow zoanthids to be resistant to genetic drift and allow them to thrive in many different environments. They can thrive in environments with an excess of nutrients, organic pollution, degradation, and a wide variety of depths and environments. While the most well-known zoanthids are the zooxanthellate containing genera, typically found in tropical and sub-tropical waters (primarily Zoanthus and Palythoa), many other species and genera exist in different waters, some still relatively unknown to science.

=== Morphology ===
Often in zooxanthellate genera, such as Zoanthus and Palythoa, there are a large number of different morphs of the same or similar species. They often differ in oral disk diameter and color, number of tentacles, color of body, polyp length, and coenenchyma development. Depending on the genera and the species, seasons, genotype, and the environment can impact the appearance of morphs. Due to this great variance in morphological plasticity and phenotypic plasticity, it is difficult to accurately identify certain species, leading to taxonomic problems and errors. However, now identification has become more accurate as they can be distinguished through chemical compounds, metabolites, and mitochondrial DNA, often demonstrating a clearer picture of the true diversity of zoanthids in an ecosystem.

=== Diet ===
Zoanthids derive their energy requirements through both photosynthesis and predation on other invertebrates. Such zooxanthellate genera have a symbiotic relationship with zooxanthellae, dinoflagellates that act as endozoic algae. These algae conduct photosynthesis within the zoanthid, providing substantial glycine or glycerol to the host, that can then be stored in lipids and proteins, or used in the synthesis of nucleotides and nucleic acids. The number of zooxanthellae can also impact the color of the body, creating additional morphs in certain species. To regulate the number of zooxanthellae, some zoanthids eject the algae; however, the expulsion can also be for dire needs caused by poor environmental conditions. Some zoanthids, like those of the Palythoa genus, also feed on exogenous organisms such as zooplankton, crustaceans, and fish particles. They often capture live prey with their tentacles and use nematocysts to pierce it. Their feeding reaction includes lip formation, mouth opening, and ingestion through the coelenteron. However, zoanthids feed by opportunity, whenever prey floats by, making their feeding irregular and inconsistent. Depending on the species and genera, some depend more on the products of photosynthesis while others depend more on opportunistic feeding. Yet, no species can actively depend solely on the products of photosynthesis.

== Families and genera ==
The families and genera within the order Zoanthin(i)aria/Zoantharia/Zoanthidea are:

- Abyssoanthidae
  - Abyssoanthus Reimer & Fujiwara in Reimer, Sinniger, Fujiwara, Hirano & Maruyama, 2007

Suborder Macrocnemina

- Epizoanthidae
  - Epizoanthus Gray, 1867
  - Paleozoanthus Carlgren, 1924
  - Thoracactis Gravier, 1918
- Hydrozoanthidae
  - Hydrozoanthus Sinniger, Reimer & Pawlowski, 2010
  - Terrazoanthus Reimer & Fujii, 2010
- Microzoanthidae
  - Microzoanthus Fujii & Reimer, 2011
- Nanozoanthidae
  - Nanozoanthus Fujii & Reimer, 2013
- Parazoanthidae
  - Antipathozoanthus Sinniger, Reimer & Pawlowski, 2010
  - Bergia Duchassaing & Michelotti, 1860
  - Bullagummizoanthus Sinniger, Ocaña & Baco, 2013
  - Corallizoanthus Reimer in Reimer Nonaka Sinniger & Iwase, 2008
  - Hurlizoanthus Sinniger, Ocaña & Baco, 2013
  - Isozoanthus Carlgren, 1905
  - Kauluzoanthus Sinniger, Ocaña & Baco, 2013
  - Kulamanamana Sinniger, Ocaña & Baco, 2013
  - Mesozoanthus Sinniger & Haussermann, 2009
  - Parazoanthus Haddon & Shackleton, 1891
  - Savalia Nardo, 1814 (synonym: Gerardia)
  - Umimayanthus Montenegro, Sinniger & Reimer, 2015
  - Zibrowius Sinniger, Ocaña & Baco, 2013
  - Churabana Kise, Hiroki et al., 2022
  - Vitrumanthus Kise, Hiroki et al., 2022

Suborder Brachycnemina

- Neozoanthidae
  - Neozoanthus
- Sphenopidae
  - Palythoa Lamouroux, 1816
  - Sphenopus Steenstrup, 1856
- Zoanthidae
  - Acrozoanthus Saville-Kent, 1893
  - Isaurus Gray, 1828
  - Zoanthus Cuvier, 1800

The classification of zoanthids is constantly changing due to new discoveries and increased research. In the past, they were often miscategorized as octocorals, mollusks, sponges, echinoderms, etc. due to misunderstandings and lack of molecular analyses. Even now, the vast majority of zoanthids are still unidentified species. In 2022, a study discovered two new genera of zoanthids: Churabana and Vitrumanthus (both in the family Parazoanthidae), as well as three new species. Another study in 2023 discovered a new species: Zoanthus aff. pulchellus.

== Reproduction and development ==
Most zoanthids reproduce asexually. All zoanthids (except Sphenopus) spawn through budding and propagation within their colonies or clones. The organization of such a process depends on the organization of sex and reproductive organs within the colonies. Some subspecies are gonochoric, meaning that populations will have both females and males, such as the suborder Macronemina. Some subspecies will be hermaphroditic, meaning each individual has both female and male reproductive organs, allowing the individual to control where and how the sperm and oocyte will interact on the septa; an example would be the suborder Brachycnemina.

The reproduction of zoanthids continues to vary in terms of spawning time and relation to its surrounding environment. Gamete production, especially the development of the oocyte, can take a very long time, making spawning often seasonal and depend much on timing. For many species, spawning will only last for around 1-3 days, often linked with the temperature and depth of the water as well as the moon phases. However, for some species at greater depths, they can breed continuously, having their spawning seasons last much longer and repeat more often.

An example of a colony of adult zoanthids.

After zoanthids finish their process of fertilization and spawning, larvae are later then produced. Larvae can range up to 6mm to 8mm in length. They typically have an average maximum of 12 septa, that divide the body. The two main types of larvae are Zoanthellae and Zonathinae, also referred to as Semper's larvae as he was the first to describe them. Zoanthellae typically reside in warmer, shallower waters while Zoanthinae have a broader range of tolerance, preferring typically cooler waters. Zoanthid larvae were at first thought to appear as one of the two with no particular reason but were later discovered to develop as one of the main two due to temperature. While more is being discovered about these two types are larvae, there is still ongoing research to find evidence of the other types of larvae throughout the world.

The development of the larvae continues as they later move onto planktonic dispersal, settlements into colonies, clones, or their solitary environment, become juveniles, and then adults continuing the cycle of reproduction, propagation, and development.

== Toxicity ==
Due to palytoxin being a molecule with a substantially complicated structure, it can be hard to break down. However, it is sensitive to pH variation, making it decompose under very acidic or basic conditions.

Some members of this order contain the highly toxic substance palytoxin, including Palythoa toxica, Palythoa tuberculosa, Palythoa vestitus, and some other species within the same genus, including the Palythoa caribaeorum, known to have the strongest palytoxin. Palytoxin is a very large hemolysin with a very complex chemical structure, with an LD_{50} in mice, making it one of the most potent toxins in marine science. Even in small quantities, palytoxin can be incapacitating or potentially fatal.

The purpose certain zoanthid species and genera have for creating palytoxins has not yet been discovered. It is often hypothesized that it is for repelling predation and reducing the number of organisms that feed upon them. It has also been documented that palytoxin accumulates within the ova of zoantharians during reproduction. The impact has not yet been classified, but it has been observed to occasionally kill ova, as well as differentiate polyp sex, making female polyps toxic and male polyps nontoxic.

Palytoxin can often accumulate within other species such as crabs and fish through predation or absorption, causing death. The toxin stays within the cells, and if consumed can also be lethal or toxic in both humans and other species of animals. In studies conducted on mice and other mammals, it was found to be the most lethal intravenously causing vasoconstriction and excessive arterial pressure leading to heart failure. If it entered their bodies another way (including inhalation and contact), it would cause fevers, fatigue, and weakness. In humans, the toxin can cause an inflammatory signaling amplification leading to excess mucus production, leukocytosis, rapid heart rate, myalgia, weakness, fevers, myocardial damage, fatigue, and rhabdomyolysis. Research also suggests that in sublethal quantities, palytoxin is a tumor promoter.

Despite the toxicity, zoanthids are often used in aquaria due to their wide variety of colors; a 2010 study found toxic species for sale in three Washington, D.C. area aquarium stores.

There is still lots of information not understood about the relationship of palytoxin and zoanthids as well as the chemical itself, but more research is being conducted.

== Aquaria ==
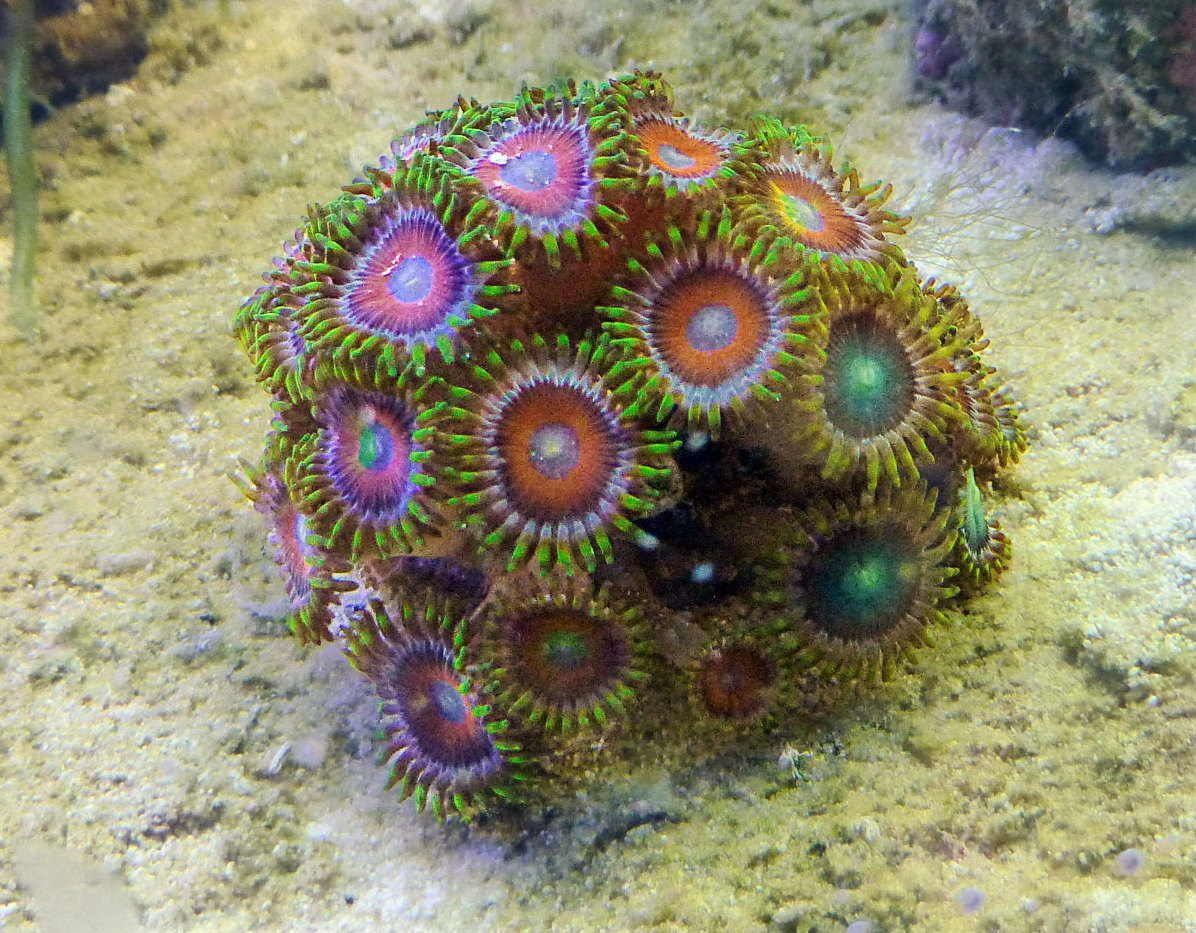
A dragon-eye zoanthid, within an exhibit of an aquarium. Its appearance and color are a strike contrast to the sand, making it appealing to visitors.

Many species are often utilized in aquaria due to their colorful morphs and to imitate the natural appearance of marine ecosystems, like tropical coral reefs. They are relatively easy to maintain and facilitate as they are resistant to many environmental changes and variances.

Zoanthids are also easy to maintain due to asexual reproduction which makes it easier to conduct vegetative or captive propagation. Animals of this order are propagated in captivity by cutting the individual polyps apart or cutting the encrusting mat to then attach to a surface with cyanoacrylate glue, making sure they do not drift. It is most common to allow the colonies to grow on loose rubble and then move and secure them to a specific base, as cutting can be difficult and can often release secretions. This process of propagation allows aquaria, both in the educational and private sector, to curtail the dependency on marine trade and taking from the wild. Further advances and efficiency in propagation as well as communication between scientists, the private sector, and aquariums can in the future improve reef restoration by applying this process in rebuilding reefs and dying aquatic ecosystems.

== Environmental role ==
=== Food source ===
While zoanthids may not be the most common prey, they are an important food source for certain species. They are preyed upon by many invertebrates such as glass squid, fireworms, mussels, polychaeta, and vertebrates such as reef fish and the hawksbill turtle. Mat-forming species have much less predators than other zoanthids, but the harlequin crab (Platypodiella picta) is one of them. Zoanthids are typically consumed as a secondary or tertiary food source, when the primary food source of a species is low in population or diseased. Since they are immune to palytoxin, the hawksbill turtle preys upon zoanthids when sponges are not available. Other reasons they would be typically eaten is for nutritional value or for the predator to accumulate palytoxin in their tissues for protection. Predation can benefit this order as it can cause dispersion of their polyps, facilitating population growth and asexual reproduction.

=== Reef structure ===
Zoanthids act as protectors of the structure of coral reefs. As overfishing increases, it leads to lower populations of higher predators causing an influx of corallivores such as urchins, sea stars, and fish. These species can decimate coral by overgrazing and feeding on dead coral, degrading the structure of the reefs. Zoanthids protect the skeletons of corals from corallivores by stinging their bodies with nematocysts and releasing allelochemicals keeping them, especially urchins, away from the corals. A study conducted in 2024 proved that zoanthids and urchins have an inverse relationship, with an increase of zoanthids decreasing the erosion of coral skeletons by 50%. As ocean acidification increases, corals and reefs are put at even more strain. Since zoanthids have no calcium carbonate exoskeleton, increasing carbon dioxide can actually benefit them, impacting coral calcification. Altogether, these functions signify how zoanthids can contribute to reef persistence.

=== Habitat biodiversity ===
This order is known to colonize rocky areas (ex. littoral rocky substrate) providing benthic shelter to many invertebrates such as crustaceans, worms, polychaetas, nudibranch, mollusks, etc. They are often labeled as "ecosystem engineers" as they transform habitats' relative diversity and increase species richness as their presence have a correlation to an increase in the number and adaptability of invertebrates in an aquatic ecosystem. However, zoanthids ability to easily colonize and adapt can often negatively impact a habitat's system. Any local disturbance, climate change and ocean acidification negatively impacts and causes the deaths of coral and other species. Since zoanthids are resistant to environmental changes, they can actually benefit from these issues due to increasing available space within an ecosystem and the toxic metabolites, meaning that ocean acidification and the current climate favors zoanthids. As coral and other species decline, zoanthids will flourish overtaking dominance in reefs and other ecosystems. Currently, it has been observed that zoanthids are dominating in some southwestern Atlantic reefs and areas previously dominated by seaweed. All of the effects have not been researched but zoanthid-dominated habitats have been seen to have a reduction in algae coverage and a decline in fish populations. As ocean acidification and climate change escalate, zoanthid dominance has been predicted to possibly cause imbalances in the ecosystem, homogenization, and have a reduction in native species. Zoanthids can cause an increase in biodiversity, especially with invertebrates but if they overrun the ecosystem, they can decrease and imbalance diversity instead.

== Conservation ==
While zoanthids are resistant to environmental change and anthropogenic issues, like all organisms, they have a range of tolerance and limits to what they can adapt to. When some zoanthids are in poor environmental conditions, they often eject most or all the zooxanthellae within them, as their bodies cannot maintain the increasing population as their bodies weaken from the environment. Zoanthids are also currently threatened in intertidal zones due to increasing ocean temperatures, rising sea levels, and radiation from the sun, causing stress in populations. Further research has also demonstrated they are also vulnerable to climate change impacts, pollution of microplastics, increasing number of invasive species, and the spread of disease. All these stressors are beginning to cause the decline of zoanthid populations, especially in shallower waters, which will eventually lead to the overall deterioration of habitats. Hence, due to the impacts of climate change, ocean pollution, and other anthropogenic issues, it is very important to have an increase in reef and aquatic ecosystem restorations.
