= P. darwini =

P. darwini may refer to:

- Palpibracus darwini
- Pantinia darwini
- Paraclius darwini
- Paraliparis darwini
- Parazoanthus darwini
- Parochlus darwini
- Pediobomyia darwini
- Pelycops darwini
- Periophthalmus darwini
- Phestia darwini, an extinct species of clam
- Phthiracarus darwini
- Phyllodactylus darwini, the Darwin's leaf-toed gecko, a lizard species in the genus Phyllodactylus
- Phyllotis darwini, the Darwin's leaf-eared mouse, a rodent species found in Argentina, Bolivia and Chile
- Pinnixa darwini, a pea crab species in the genus Pinnixa and the family Pinnotheridae
- Platydecticus darwini
- Platytomus darwini
- Polynema darwini
- Polystyliphora darwini
- Psammolyce darwini
- Pteronema darwini
- Puijila darwini, an extinct pinniped species which lived during the Miocene epoch

== See also ==
- P. darwinii (disambiguation)
- Darwini (disambiguation)
