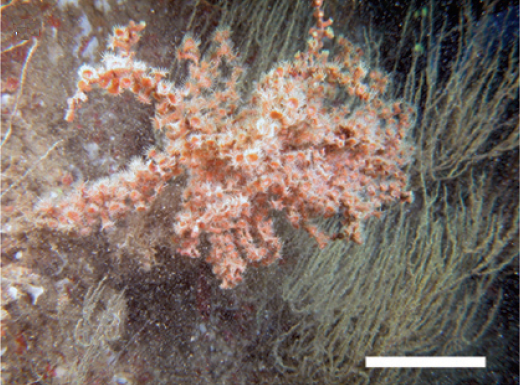

Scientific classification
- Domain: Eukaryota
- Kingdom: Animalia
- Phylum: Cnidaria
- Class: Hexacorallia
- Order: Zoantharia
- Family: Parazoanthidae
- Genus: Antipathozoanthus
- Species: A. hickmani

Binomial name
- Antipathozoanthus hickmani Reimer & Fujii, 2010

= Antipathozoanthus hickmani =

Species of coral

Antipathozoanthus hickmani is a species of macrocnemic zoanthid first found in the Galapagos. It can be distinguished by its exclusive association with Antipathes galapagensis, and having about 40 tentacles.
