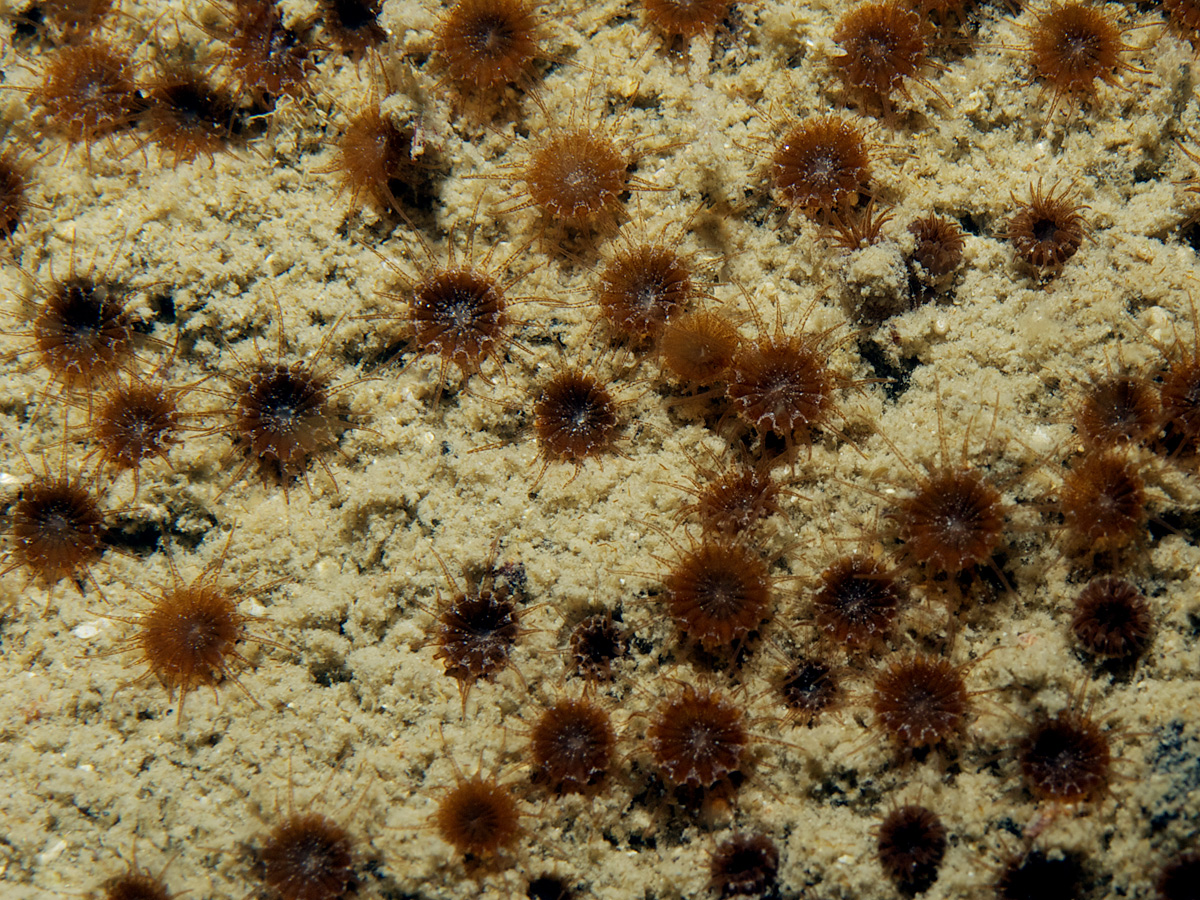
- In Lough Hyne, Co. Cork, Ireland.

Scientific classification
- Kingdom: Animalia
- Phylum: Cnidaria
- Subphylum: Anthozoa
- Class: Hexacorallia
- Order: Zoantharia
- Family: Parazoanthidae
- Genus: Isozoanthus
- Species: I. sulcatus

Binomial name
- Isozoanthus sulcatus (Gosse, 1859)

Synonyms
- Parazoanthus sulcatus

= Isozoanthus sulcatus =

Species of coral

Isozoanthus sulcatus is a species of zoanthid in the family Parazoanthidae.

== Description ==
Isozoanthus sulcatus is a small colonial, anemone-like anthozoan found in European waters. The polyps grow to 2 mm in diameter and are found in patches which are typically about 50 mm across. The body is tall and thin with a tentacle-ringed mouth. The colour is brown and the species is sometimes called "ginger tinies". It typically produces colonies of around 50 or more individuals with concentrations from 3.7 to 17/cm^2. Individual polyps can have 16-30 tentacles each and are characterized by their brown color, owing to the presence of symbiotic photosynthetic zooxanthellae living inside of them. This species is also unique due to its banded coenenchyme that links individuals together. They are most often between 2-3 mm in diameter and can be from 5-10 mm in height.

== Habitat & Distribution ==
This species is found in the NE Atlantic Ocean, on south-western coasts of England and Wales and the southern, western and northern coasts of Ireland. Isozoanthus sulcatus is also commonly found in temperate waters on the western coast of France, but can be found as far east as the southwestern coast of Norway. They live from the intertidal to about 42 m down in the sublittoral on horizontal silt-covered substrate, empty mollusc shells, and even in rocky intertidal pools as epibiota. Because of their size and habits, they are found often through diving and dredging.

== Taxonomy ==
Isozoanthus sulcatus is distinct from other species in its family Parazoanthidae. It is morphologically unique and in addition contains differences in the genetic sequences mitochondrial cytochrome oxidase subunit 1 (COI) and the nuclear internal transcribed spacer region (ITS rDNA), both genetic markers used to classify Parazoanthidae. These differences diverge strongly enough from other parazoanthids to provide evidence that it does not belong to Isozoanthus. Further research is needed to confirm this.

== Morphology ==
This species produces small polyp individuals with a 2 rings of blunt tentacles surrounding their oral cavity. The secondary, or outer layer, has tentacles about 1 mm in length, while the primary, or inner are about 15-25% longer. Most polyps have the same number of tentacles in each ring, and individuals typically have between 20 and 24 total. Their bandlike coenenchyme links individuals together and has tiny grains of sand embedded in it. Their oral disk also has small grains embedded inside of it, leading to an appearance of silvery flecks on the ectoderm of the organism. Due to the presence of photosynthetic zooxanthellae, they have a brown coloration.

== Behavior ==
Isozoanthus sulcatus uses its tentacles to collect small food particles from its environment and supplements this source of nutrients with symbiotic photosynthetic zooxanthellae. It has a tendency to open its tentacles when exposed to light for longer than 5 minutes and it is theorized that this behavior is the organism trying to help its symbionts photosynthesize more readily. In addition, they contract their tentacles into their oral cavity when in a dark environment for a long period of time. Individual polyps will also close in response to harsh stimuli, such as being touched by a probing appendage, and nearby polyps will subsequently close in kind, radiating outward, due to the colonial nerve network that links them together. When exposed to semi-darkness at a temperature of 23°C for a period of 24h, polyps will expel a thick mucus that contains a large amount of zooxanthellae.

Sp. sulcatus contains highly efficient photosynthetic symbionts that are able to produce more than enough of their host's daily respiratory carbon requirements. It holds the record for the highest (96%) translocation rate of carbon for algal-invertebrate symbiosis. It is speculated that it can satisfy metabolic carbon requirements with autotrophy under favorable irradiance regimes, and at 1.5 meters on sunny days, the algae within it can produce up to 181% of its daily respiratory carbon needs. At 9 meters on sunny days, the host's daily respiratory carbon requirements would be met, however they would not be met on cloudy days.

Considering the fact that most temperate anthozoa are found at depths of greater than 9 meters, it is suggested that heterotrophy can supply the organism with almost, if not a completely sufficient amount of carbon it needs in order to survive, not taking into account various other nutrients and trace elements needed by organisms to function. However, the experiments conducted measured only excess carbon produced by the zooxanthellae. The actual amount utilized by sulcatus may not reflect these value as the algae may store carbon for its own uses.
