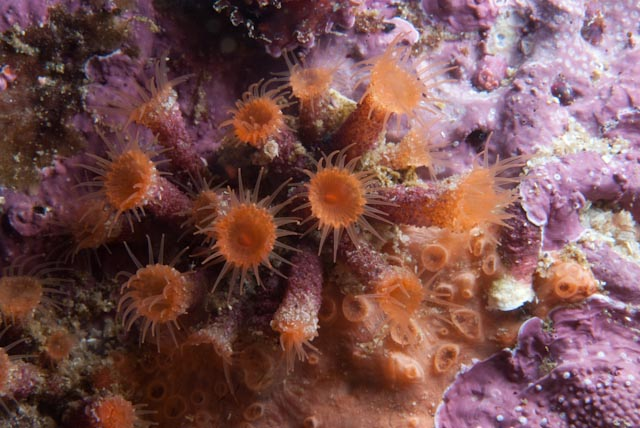

Scientific classification
- Kingdom: Animalia
- Phylum: Cnidaria
- Subphylum: Anthozoa
- Class: Hexacorallia
- Order: Zoantharia
- Family: Parazoanthidae
- Genus: Isozoanthus
- Species: I. capensis

Binomial name
- Isozoanthus capensis Carlgren, 1905

= Isozoanthus capensis =

Species of coral

Isozoanthus capensis, the Cape zoanthid, is a species of zoanthid in the family Parazoanthidae.

== Description ==
Isozoanthus capensis is a small colonial, anemone-like anthozoan. It grows up to 0.5 cm across. It has an upright hollow columnar body with a tentacle-ringed mouth. It is orange to pink with a few spiky tentacles and a sand coated body column.

== Distribution ==
It has so far been found only from the Cape Peninsula and to Port St Johns on the South African coast. It appears to be endemic to this area, and lives in shallow water.

== Ecology ==
This zoanthid is usually found in small colonies of around 20-50 individuals under overhangs. It feeds on plankton.
