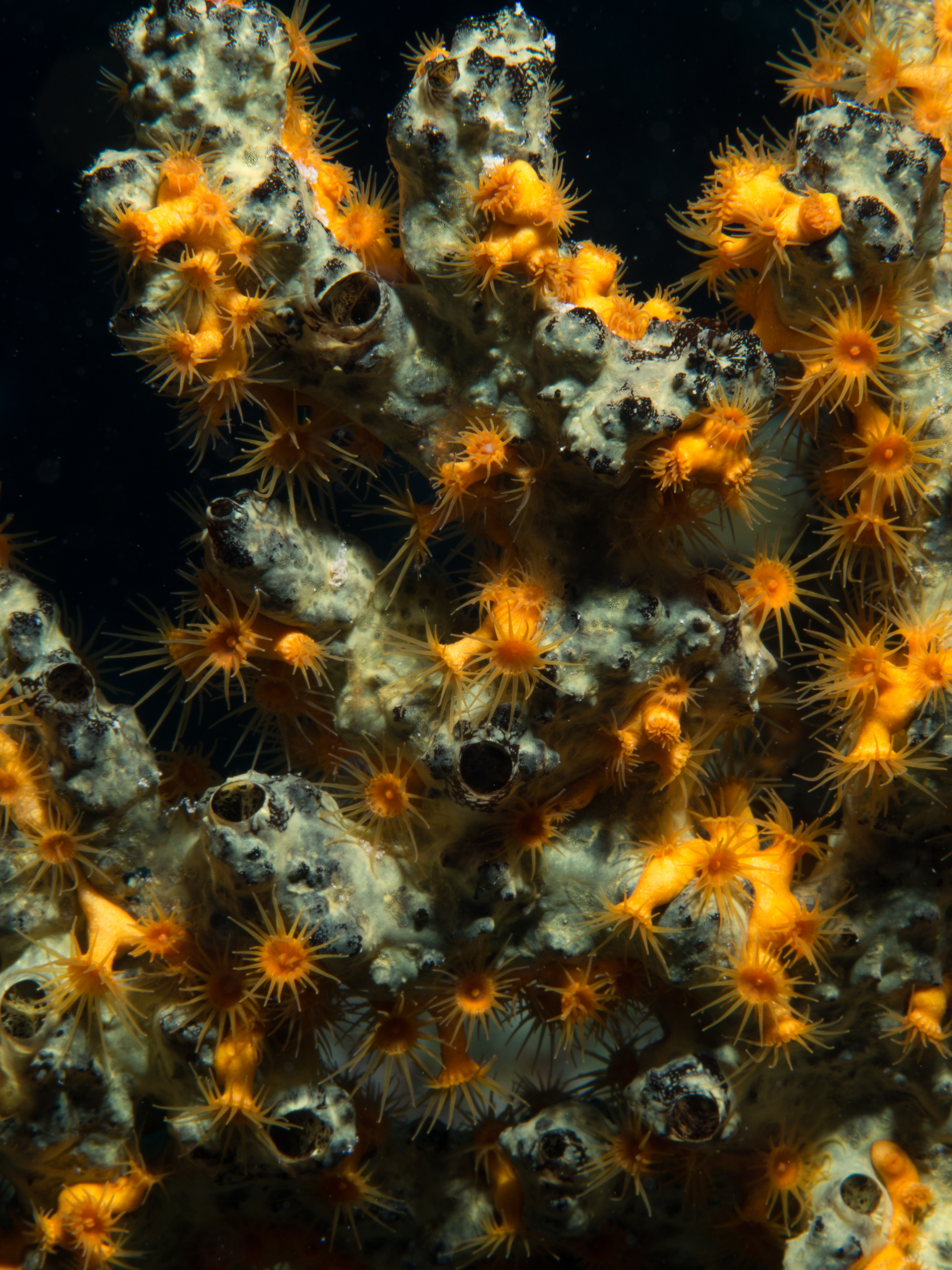
- Parazoanthus swiftii growing on Iotrochota birotulata

Scientific classification
- Kingdom: Animalia
- Phylum: Cnidaria
- Subphylum: Anthozoa
- Class: Hexacorallia
- Order: Zoantharia
- Family: Parazoanthidae
- Genus: Parazoanthus
- Species: P. swiftii

Binomial name
- Parazoanthus swiftii (Duchassaing & Michelotti, 1860)

= Parazoanthus swiftii =

Species of coral

Parazoanthus swiftii, commonly known as the golden zoanthid, is a species of coral in the order Zoantharia which grows symbiotically on several species of sponge. It is found in shallow waters in the Caribbean Sea and western Atlantic Ocean.

== Description ==
The golden zoanthid is a colonial coral that grows in small irregular groups and linear rows that wind over the surface of its host sponge. It does not have a calcareous skeleton but the polyps are connected by a membranous basal connection. The polyps look like small sea anemones and are orange or bright yellow and about 0.6 centimetres (0.24 in) in diameter. They have a slender column and up to twenty six long, thin, pale yellow tentacles. As much as half the surface of the sponge may be covered by the coral, which may consist of up to 200 polyps.

== Distribution and habitat ==
The golden zoanthid is common in the Caribbean Sea and round the Bahamas. It is also known from Jamaica, Puerto Rico and the Virgin Islands. It is mostly found at depths between 10 and 20 metres (33 and 66 ft) but occasionally occurs in shallower water. It is always found colonising a sponge, often the brown tube sponge (Agelas conifera), the green finger sponge (Iotrochota birotulata) or the pink or brown Topsentia ophiraphidites. It usually occurs in sandy or silty locations.

== Biology ==
The golden zoanthid often contrasts vividly in colour with its host sponge, which would be expected to advertise its presence to potential sponge predators. It contains toxic substances that may deter fish such as the rock beauty (Holacanthus tricolor) from eating the host sponge. The golden zoanthid may also benefit from living on a sponge in that the sponge is a filter feeder and actively draws in a current of water through its pores. It can only cope with the most minute particles and the polyps may be able to capture the bigger food items wafted along in the current.

The size of a golden zoanthid colony is increased by budding. New polyps generally grow at the ends of the rows.
