= Iotrochota birotulata =

Scientific classification
- Kingdom: Animalia
- Phylum: Porifera
- Class: Demospongiae
- Order: Poecilosclerida
- Family: Iotrochotidae
- Genus: Iotrochota
- Species: I. birotulata

Binomial name
- Iotrochota birotulata (Higgin, 1877)

Synonyms
- List: Halichondria birotulata Higgin, 1876; Hyrtios musciformis Duchassaing & Michelotti, 1864; Iotrochota bistylata Boury-Esnault, 1973

Species of sponge

Iotrochota birotulata, commonly known as the green finger sponge, is a species of sea sponge in the family Iotrochotidae. It is found in shallow waters in the Caribbean Sea.

== Description ==
The green finger sponge usually has upright or sprawling cylindrical branches that occasionally divide. The branches are about 4 centimetres (1.6 in) in diameter and can grow to 50 centimetres (20 in) in length. Young individuals and some large specimens have an encrusting habit. They grow over the surface of a rock in a layer a few millimetres thick with occasional short chimney-like outgrowths. Other individuals have a number of vertical tubes, each with a large opening called an osculum at the end. These variations in growth habit led to the belief that several different species of sponge were involved. However, specimens growing in reef caves often have an encrusting base with a central, finger-like cluster of branches, so it is now believed that the different forms are a single species, perhaps differing in structure because of different environmental conditions. In the branched form, the osculi are found on the upper side of the branches and may be slightly raised above the surrounding tissue. The consistency of the sponge is soft but resilient, and when squeezed, it exudes a purple fluid. The general colour of the sponge is purplish black but there is often a layer of bright green cells on the epidermis. These have dendritic patterns on the surface and cover sub-surface canals which lead to the osculi.

The golden zoanthid (Parazoanthus swiftii), a colonial coral, is often found twined round the sponge in a symbiotic relationship. This symbiont is related to sea anemones and contain toxins which deter predatory fish from eating the sponge. The coral benefits from the increased volume of food particles the colony's polyps can capture as water is drawn through fine pores into the sponge.

== Distribution and habitat ==
The green finger sponge is found in the Caribbean Sea at depths varying from 2 to 15 metres (6 ft 7 in to 49 ft 3 in). Its range includes the West Indies, the Bahamas, southern Florida, Venezuela and northern Brazil, but it is absent from Bermuda. It inhabits reefs, the deeper water outside the reef crests and the underside and surfaces of rocks in shallow bays.
