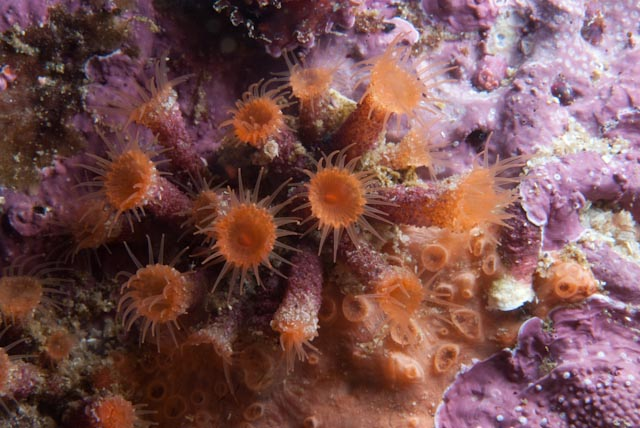
- Isozoanthus capensis

Scientific classification
- Kingdom: Animalia
- Phylum: Cnidaria
- Subphylum: Anthozoa
- Class: Hexacorallia
- Order: Zoantharia
- Family: Parazoanthidae
- Genus: Isozoanthus; Carlgren, 1905

= Isozoanthus =

Genus of sea anemones

Isozoanthus is a genus of anemone-like anthozoans in the order Zoantharia.

== Species ==
Species in this genus include:

- Isozoanthus africanus Carlgren, 1923
- Isozoanthus altisulcatus Carlgren, 1939
- Isozoanthus arborescens (Danielssen, 1890)
- Isozoanthus arenosus Carlgren, 1923
- Isozoanthus bulbosus Carlgren, 1913
- Isozoanthus capensis Carlgren, 1938
- Isozoanthus davisi Carlgren, 1913
- Isozoanthus dubius Carlgren, 1913
- Isozoanthus giganteus Carlgren in Chun, 1903
- Isozoanthus gilchristi Carlgren, 1938
- Isozoanthus ingolfi Carlgren, 1913
- Isozoanthus islandicus Carlgren, 1913
- Isozoanthus magninsulosus Carlgren, 1913
- Isozoanthus multinsulosus Carlgren, 1913
- Isozoanthus sulcatus (Gosse, 1859)
- Isozoanthus valdivae Carlgren, 1923
