= Platytomus antipodum =

Scientific classification
- Kingdom: Animalia
- Phylum: Arthropoda
- Clade: Pancrustacea
- Class: Insecta
- Order: Coleoptera
- Suborder: Polyphaga
- Infraorder: Scarabaeiformia
- Family: Scarabaeidae
- Genus: Platytomus
- Species: P. antipodum

Binomial name
- Platytomus antipodum (Fauvel, 1903)

Synonyms
- Psammobius antipodum Fauvel, 1903

Species of beetle

Platytomus antipodum is a species of beetle of the family Scarabaeidae. It is found in New Caledonia.

== Description ==
Adults reach a length of about 2.6–2.9 mm (0.10–0.11 in). They have a convex, glossy, glabrous, dark reddish-brown body, with the periphery of the head, the lateral margins of the pronotum, and often also the elytra paler. The legs are reddish-brown.
