= Platytomus longulus =

Scientific classification
- Kingdom: Animalia
- Phylum: Arthropoda
- Clade: Pancrustacea
- Class: Insecta
- Order: Coleoptera
- Suborder: Polyphaga
- Infraorder: Scarabaeiformia
- Family: Scarabaeidae
- Genus: Platytomus
- Species: P. longulus

Binomial name
- Platytomus longulus (Cartwright, 1948)

Synonyms
- Pleurophorus longulus Cartwright, 1948

Species of beetle

Platytomus longulus is a species of aphodiine dung beetle in the family Scarabaeidae. It is found in the United States (Alabama, Florida, Mississippi, South Carolina, Texas), as well as in Argentina, Bolivia, Brazil (Amazonas, Distrito Federal, Espírito Santo, Mato Grosso, Mato Grosso do Sul, Minas Gerais, Paraná, Pernambuco, Rio Grande do Sul, Rondônia, Santa Catarina, São Paulo), Guyana, Honduras, Suriname and Uruguay.

== Description ==
Adults reach a length of about 2–2.4 mm (0.079–0.094 in). The body is light to dark testaceous.
