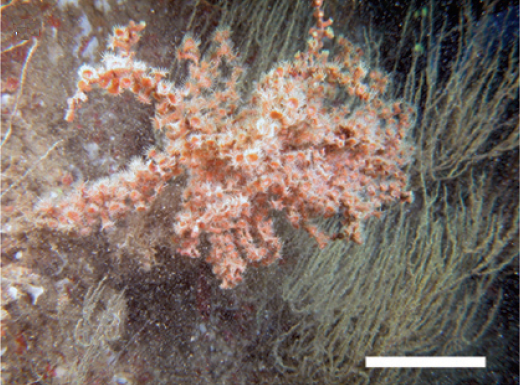
- Antipathozoanthus hickmani

Scientific classification
- Domain: Eukaryota
- Kingdom: Animalia
- Phylum: Cnidaria
- Subphylum: Anthozoa
- Class: Hexacorallia
- Order: Zoantharia
- Family: Parazoanthidae
- Genus: Antipathozoanthus; Sinniger, Reimer & Pawlowski, 2010

Species
- Antipathozoanthus cavernus Kise, Fujii, Masucci, Biondi & Reimer, 2017; Antipathozoanthus hickmani Reimer & Fujii, 2010; Antipathozoanthus macaronesicus (Ocana & Brito, 2003); Antipathozoanthus obscurus Kise, Fujii, Masucci, Biondi & Reimer, 2017; Antipathozoanthus remengesaui Kise, Fujii, Masucci, Biondi & Reimer, 2017

= Antipathozoanthus =

Genus of corals

Antipathozoanthus is a genus of macrocnemic zoanthid in the family Parazoanthidae.
