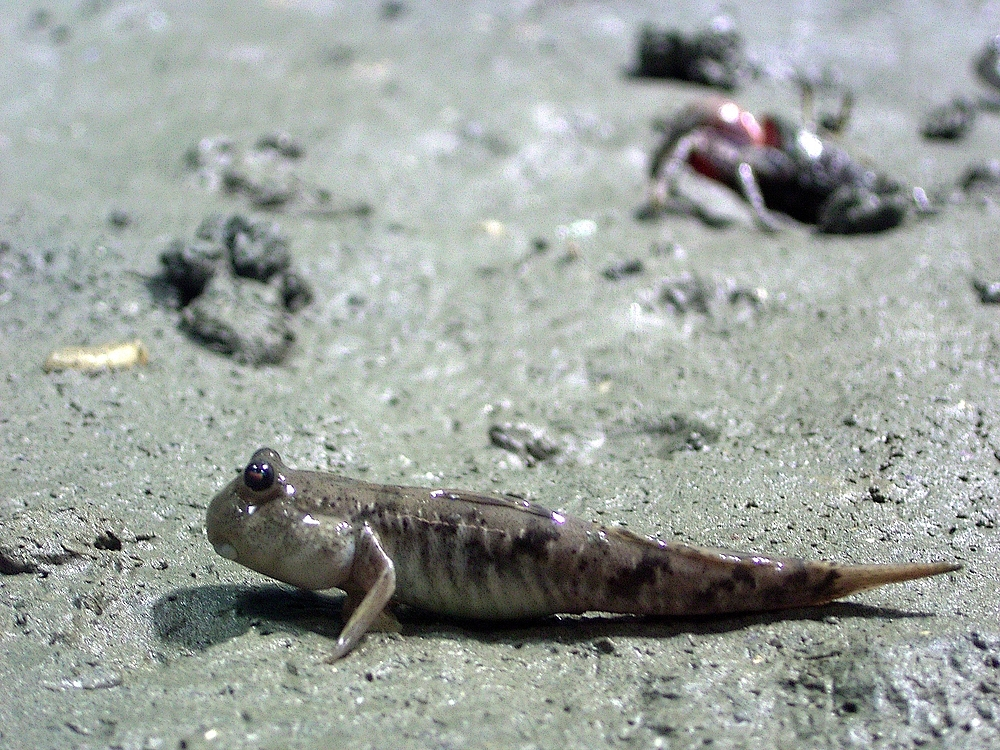

Conservation status
- Least Concern (IUCN 3.1)

Scientific classification
- Kingdom: Animalia
- Phylum: Chordata
- Class: Actinopterygii
- Division: Teleostei
- Order: Gobiiformes
- Family: Oxudercidae
- Genus: Periophthalmus
- Species: P. modestus

Binomial name
- Periophthalmus modestus Cantor, 1842

Synonyms
- Apocryptes cantonensis Osbeck, 1757

= Shuttles hoppfish =

Species of fish

The shuttles hoppfish or shuttles mudskipper (Periophthalmus modestus) is a species of mudskippers native to fresh, marine and brackish waters of the western Pacific Ocean from Vietnam to Korea and Japan. This species occurs in muddy estuaries, tidal flats and swamps and marshes and is capable of remaining out of the water for up to 60 hours so long as it is kept moist. This species can reach a length of 10 centimetres (3.9 in) TL. This species can also be found in the aquarium trade and is also used in traditional Chinese medicine.

They are common in Hong Kong, Taiwan, and Southeast Asia and other places of mangrove wetlands and mudflats.
