= Platytomus micros =

Scientific classification
- Kingdom: Animalia
- Phylum: Arthropoda
- Clade: Pancrustacea
- Class: Insecta
- Order: Coleoptera
- Suborder: Polyphaga
- Infraorder: Scarabaeiformia
- Family: Scarabaeidae
- Genus: Platytomus
- Species: P. micros

Binomial name
- Platytomus micros (Bates, 1887)

Synonyms
- Diastictus californicus Petrovitz, 1963; Pleurophorus batesi Arrow, 1903; Psammodius micros Bates, 1887

Species of beetle

Platytomus micros is a species of aphodiine dung beetle in the family Scarabaeidae. It is found in the United States (Arizona, California, Nevada, South Carolina, Texas, Utah), Chile, Guatemala and Mexico (Baja California Sur, Chiapas, Colima, México, Morelos, Puebla, Veracruz).
