= P. darwinii =

P. darwinii may refer to:

- Pachycondyla darwinii, Forel, 1893, an ant species in the genus Pachycondyla found in India
- Pacifigorgia darwinii
- Parahelops darwinii
- Pleurodema darwinii, the four-eyed frog, a frog species found in Brazil, Chile, Uruguay and possibly Argentina
- Pleuropetalum darwinii, a plant species endemic to Ecuador
- Pterocnemia darwinii, the Darwin's Rhea, a large flightless bird species found in the Altiplano and Patagonia in South America

== See also ==
- P. darwini (disambiguation)
- Darwinii (disambiguation)
