= Platytomus atlanticus =

Scientific classification
- Kingdom: Animalia
- Phylum: Arthropoda
- Clade: Pancrustacea
- Class: Insecta
- Order: Coleoptera
- Suborder: Polyphaga
- Infraorder: Scarabaeiformia
- Family: Scarabaeidae
- Genus: Platytomus
- Species: P. atlanticus

Binomial name
- Platytomus atlanticus (Cartwright, 1948)

Synonyms
- Pleurophorus atlanticus Cartwright, 1948

Species of beetle

Platytomus atlanticus is a species of aphodiine dung beetle in the family Scarabaeidae. It is found in Canada (Ontario) and the United States (South Carolina, New Jersey, Michigan, Florida).
