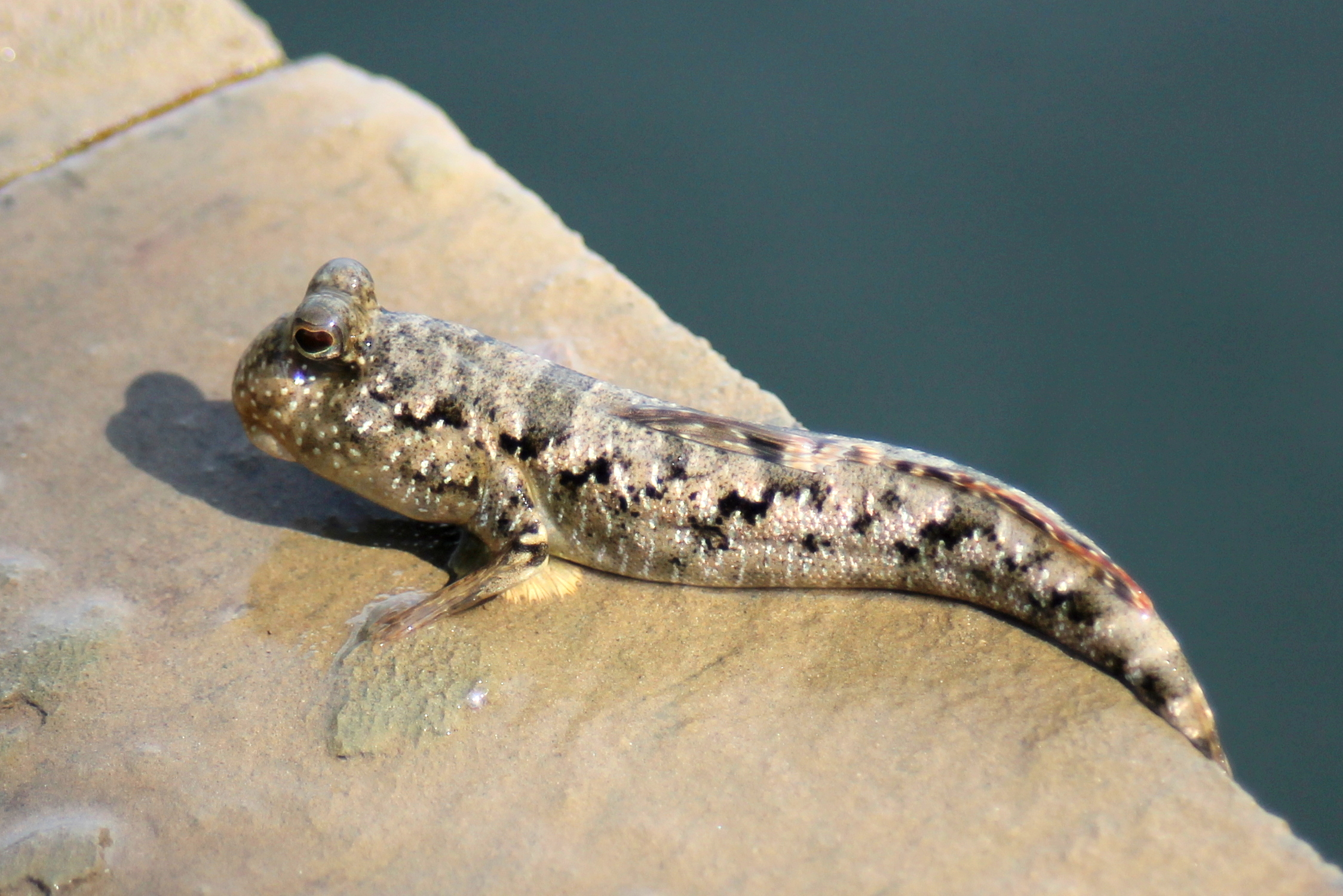

Scientific classification
- Domain: Eukaryota
- Kingdom: Animalia
- Phylum: Chordata
- Class: Actinopterygii
- Order: Gobiiformes
- Family: Oxudercidae
- Genus: Periophthalmus
- Species: P. argentilineatus

Binomial name
- Periophthalmus argentilineatus Valenciennes, 1837

Synonyms
- Periophthalmus dipus Bleeker, 1854; Euchoristopus kalolo regius Whitley, 1931; Periophthalmus vulgaris regius (Whitley, 1931); Periophthalmus vulgaris Eggert, 1935; Periophthalmus vulgaris vulgaris Eggert, 1935; Periophthalmus sobrinus Eggert, 1935; Periophthalmus vulgaris notatus Eggert, 1935; Periophthalmus vulgaris ceylonensis Eggert, 1935; Periophthalmus dipus parvus Eggert, 1935; Periophthalmus dipus angustiformis Eggert, 1935; Periophthalmus argentilineatus striopunctatus Eggert, 1935

= Barred mudskipper =

Species of fish

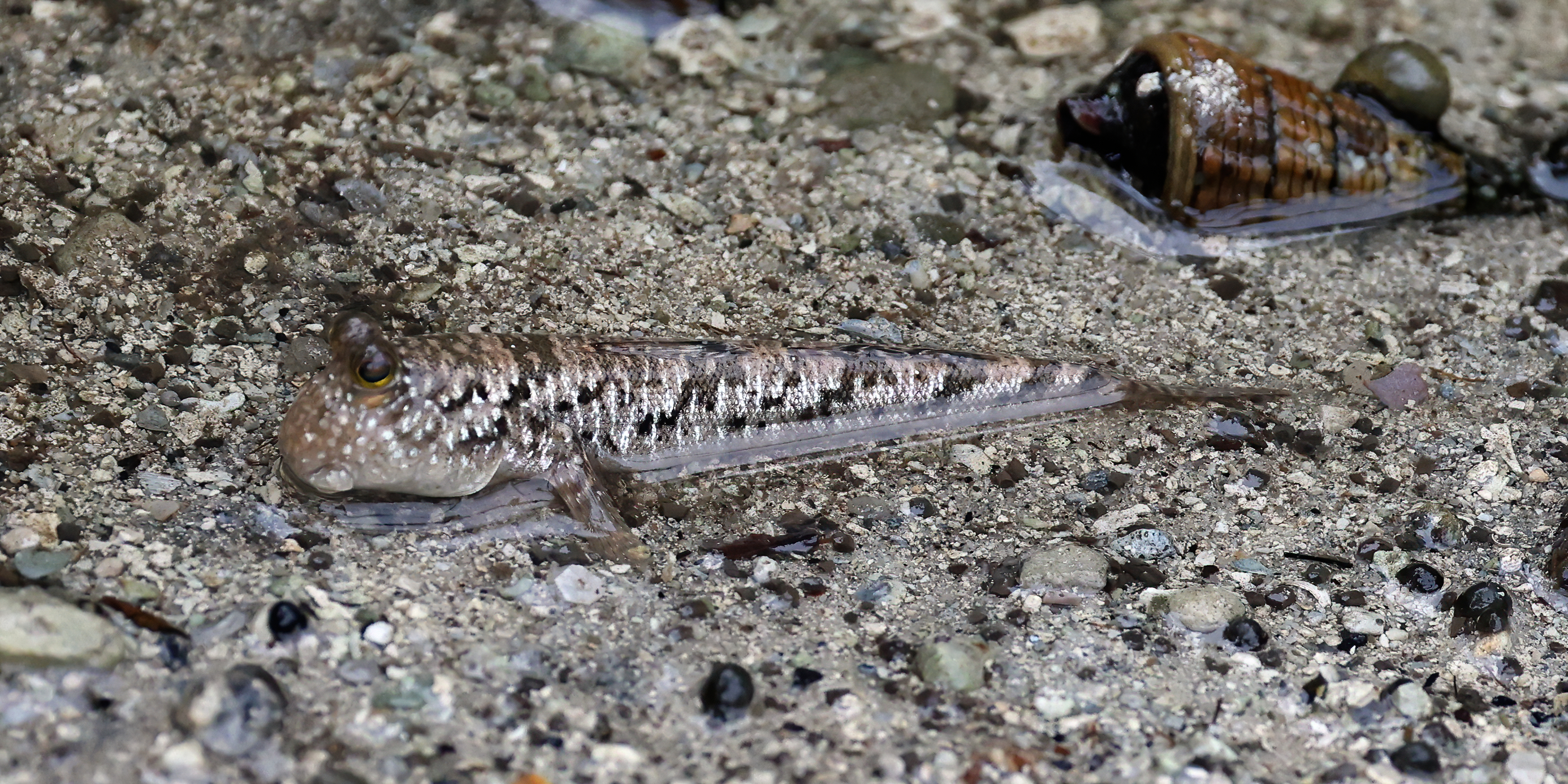
Ko Phi Phi, Thailand

The barred mudskipper (Periophthalmus argentilineatus) or silverlined mudskipper, is a species of mudskippers native to marine, fresh and brackish waters from the African coast of the Indian Ocean, to the Marianas and Samoa in the western Pacific Ocean, and from the Ryukyus south to Australia. This species occurs in mangrove forests and nipa palm stands and can cross surfaces of mud while out of the water. This species can reach a length of 19 centimetres (7.5 in) TL. It can also be found in the aquarium trade.
Parasites of the barred mudskipper include Acanthocephalan larvae and the small Opecoelid Digenean (Opegaster ouemoensis) parasite in the intestine and described from fish collected in New Caledonia.
