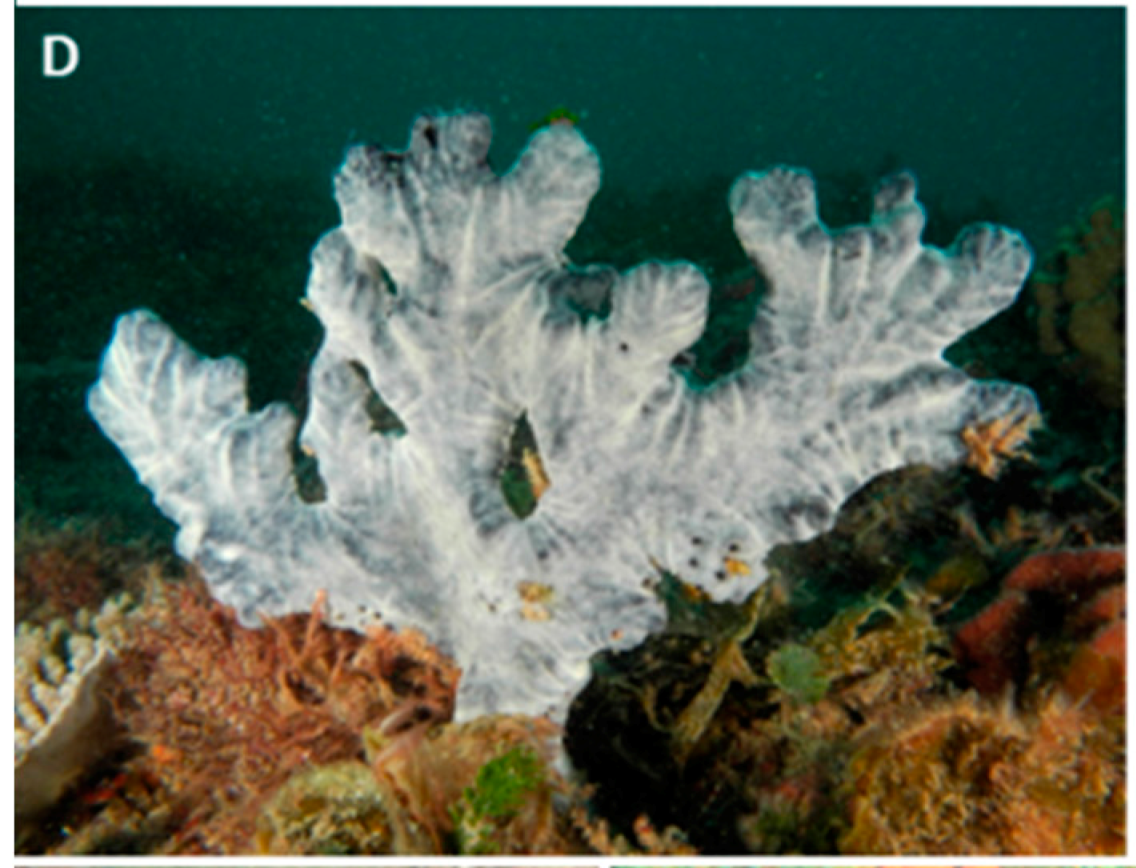

Scientific classification
- Kingdom: Animalia
- Phylum: Porifera
- Class: Demospongiae
- Order: Poecilosclerida
- Family: Iotrochotidae
- Genus: Iotrochota; Ridley, 1884

= Iotrochota =

Genus of sponges

Iotrochota is a genus of sponges belonging to the family Iotrochotidae.

The species of this genus are found in tropical or subtropical regions.

Species:

- Iotrochota acerata Dendy, 1896
- Iotrochota agglomerata Lehnert & van Soest, 1999
- Iotrochota arenosa Rützler, Maldonado, Piantoni & Riesgo, 2007
- Iotrochota birotulata Higgin, 1877
