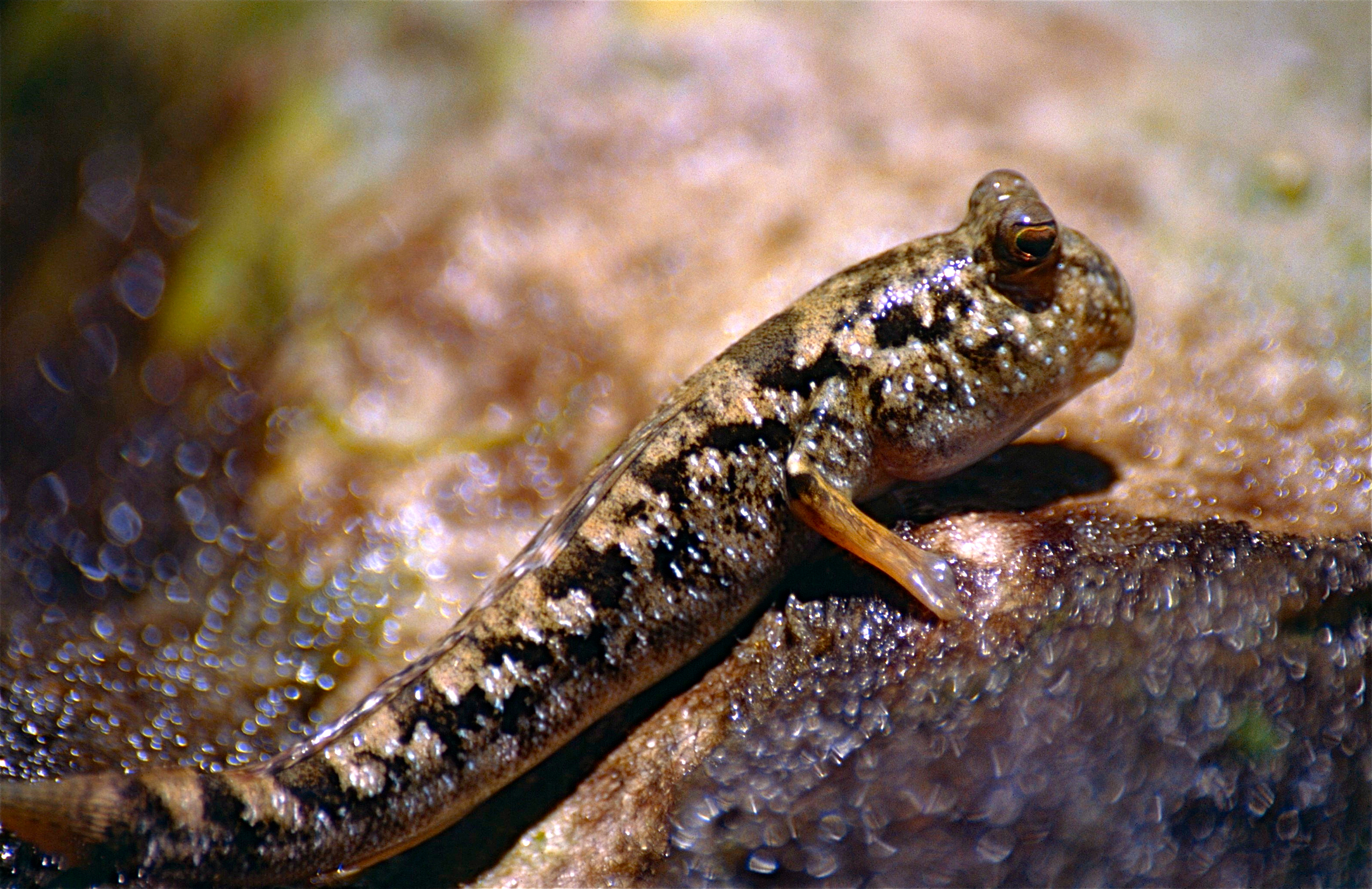
- In Madagascar

Scientific classification
- Kingdom: Animalia
- Phylum: Chordata
- Class: Actinopterygii
- Division: Teleostei
- Order: Gobiiformes
- Family: Oxudercidae
- Genus: Periophthalmus
- Species: P. kalolo

Binomial name
- Periophthalmus kalolo Lesson, 1831

Synonyms
- Periophthalmus africanus Eggert, 1935; Periophthalmus koelreuteri africanus Eggert, 1935

= Common mudskipper =

Species of fish

The common mudskipper (Periophthalmus kalolo) is a species of mudskipper native to marine and brackish waters of the Indo-Pacific from eastern Africa to Samoa. This species can be found in mangrove forests where it spends most of its time out of the water. This species can reach a length of 14.1 centimetres (5.6 in) SL. The common mudskipper can deal with the chronic temperatures of up to 37°C and a chronic low of 14°C. Larger individuals aggregate in exposed intertidal mudflats and tend to spend about 90% of their lifetime out of the water.
