= Platytomus parvulus =

Scientific classification
- Kingdom: Animalia
- Phylum: Arthropoda
- Clade: Pancrustacea
- Class: Insecta
- Order: Coleoptera
- Suborder: Polyphaga
- Infraorder: Scarabaeiformia
- Family: Scarabaeidae
- Genus: Platytomus
- Species: P. parvulus

Binomial name
- Platytomus parvulus (Chevrolat, 1865)

Synonyms
- Psammodius parvulus Chevrolat, 1865; Psammodius nanus Horn, 1887

Species of beetle

Platytomus parvulus is a species of beetle of the family Scarabaeidae. It is found in Brazil (Mato Grosso, Pernambuco, Rio Grande do Norte), Colombia, Cuba, the Dominican Republic, Jamaica, Martinique, Saint Croix, Saint Vincent, Trinidad & Tobago and the Virgin Islands.

== Description ==
Adults reach a length of about 1.8–3 mm (0.071–0.118 in). The body is brown. The clypeus is emarginate, with the margin not upturned. The frontoclypeal suture is not visible. The pronotum has punctures of two sizes, fine and coarse. The elytra has deep striae and the interstriae are weakly convex.
