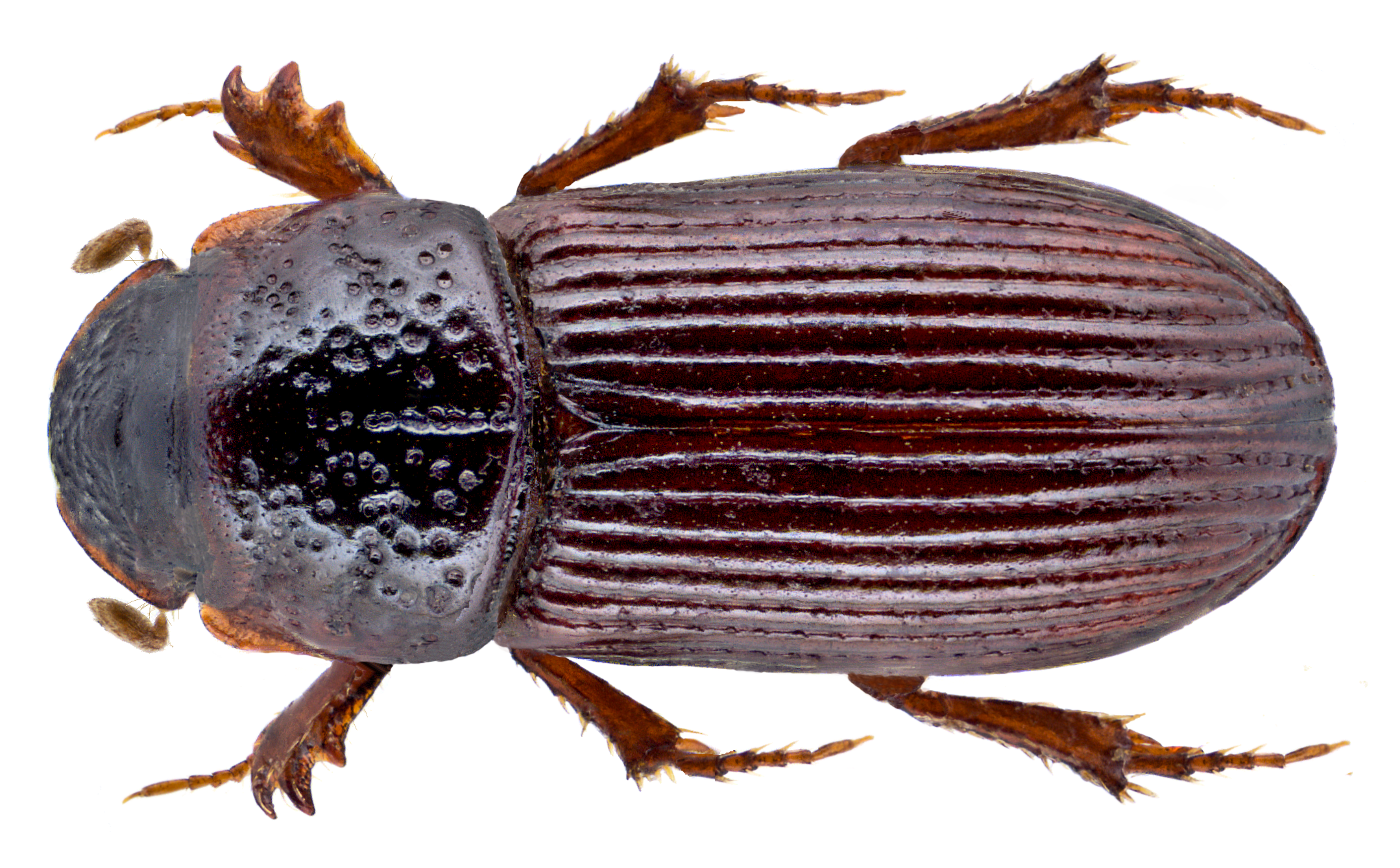

Scientific classification
- Kingdom: Animalia
- Phylum: Arthropoda
- Clade: Pancrustacea
- Class: Insecta
- Order: Coleoptera
- Suborder: Polyphaga
- Infraorder: Scarabaeiformia
- Family: Scarabaeidae
- Genus: Platytomus
- Species: P. variolosus

Binomial name
- Platytomus variolosus (Kolenati, 1846)

Synonyms
- Oxyomus variolosus Kolenati, 1846; Pleurophorus afghanus Balthasar, 1955; Pleurophorus variolosus; Psammobius foveicollis Ballion, 1871

= Platytomus variolosus =

Species of beetle

Platytomus variolosus is a species of beetle of the family Scarabaeidae. It is found in Afghanistan, Armenia, Azerbaijan, China (Xinjiang), Kazakhstan, Russia (including the Russian Far East), Tajikistan, Turkey, Turkmenistan, Ukraine and Uzbekistan.

== Description ==
Adults reach a length of about 2.5–3.2 mm (0.098–0.126 in). They have a slender, almost parallel-sided, slightly convex, shiny, blackish-brown body, with the elytra usually lighter reddish-brown. The anterior margin of the head and the legs are light reddish-brown.
