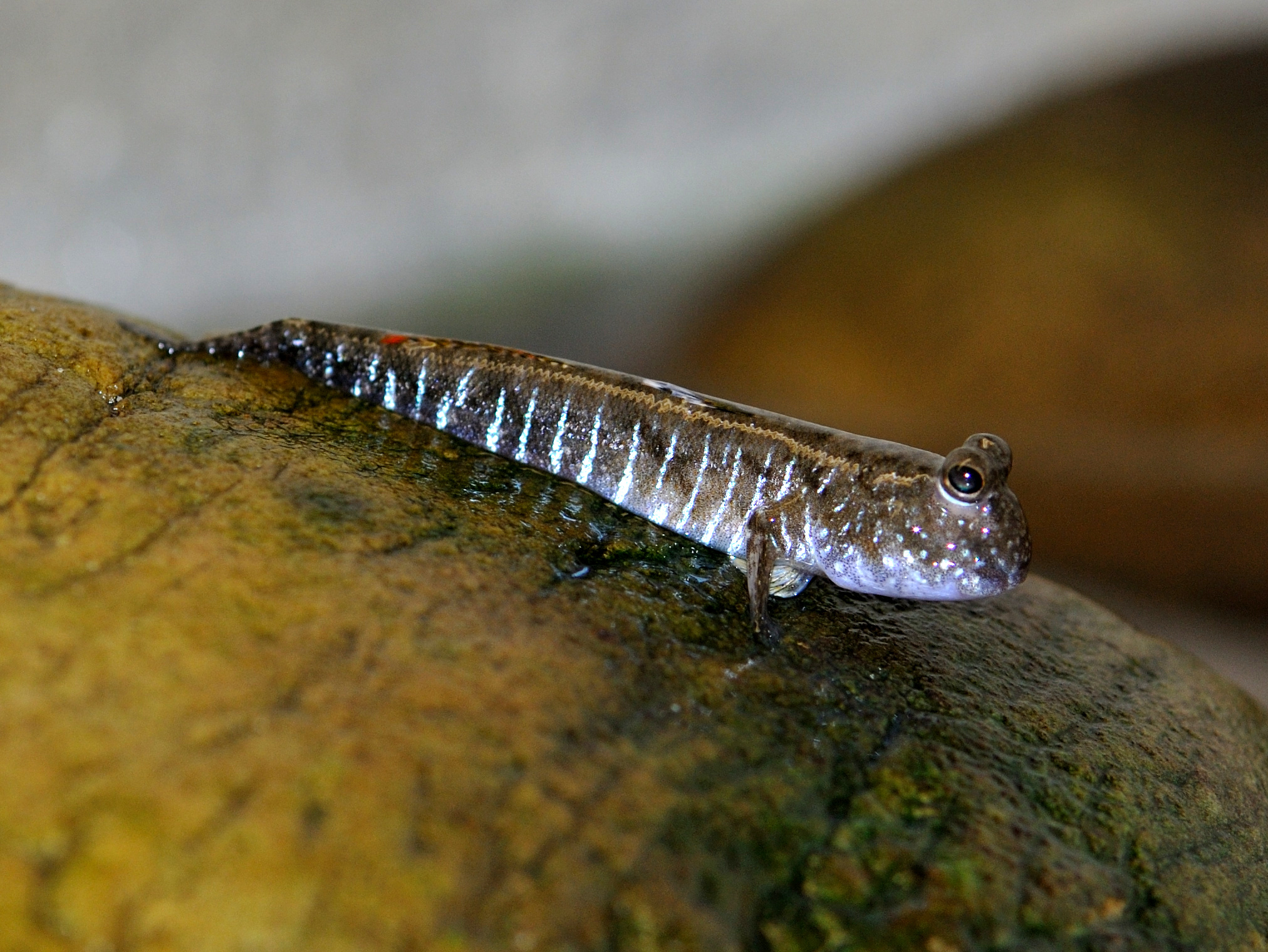

Scientific classification
- Domain: Eukaryota
- Kingdom: Animalia
- Phylum: Chordata
- Class: Actinopterygii
- Order: Gobiiformes
- Family: Oxudercidae
- Genus: Periophthalmus
- Species: P. novemradiatus

Binomial name
- Periophthalmus novemradiatus (F. Hamilton, 1822)

Synonyms
- Gobius novemradiatus F. Hamilton, 1822; Periophthalmus pearsei Eggert, 1935

= Pearse's mudskipper =

Species of fish

Pearse's mudskipper (Periophthalmus novemradiatus) or Indian dwarf mudskipper, is a species of mudskippers native to marine and brackish waters along the coasts of the Bay of Bengal. This species is amphibious, dwelling in intertidal areas. It can reach a length of 10 centimetres (3.9 in) SL.
