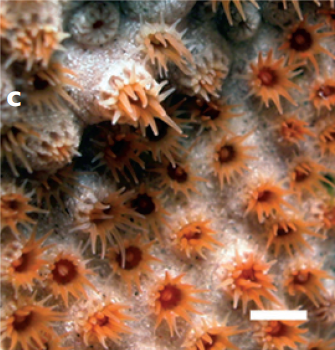

Scientific classification
- Kingdom: Animalia
- Phylum: Cnidaria
- Subphylum: Anthozoa
- Class: Hexacorallia
- Order: Zoantharia
- Family: Parazoanthidae
- Genus: Parazoanthus
- Species: P. darwini

Binomial name
- Parazoanthus darwini Reimer & Fujii, 2010

= Parazoanthus darwini =

Species of coral

Parazoanthus darwini is a species of macrocnemic zoanthid first found in the Galapagos. It can be distinguished by its association with sponges, by having about 24–30 tentacles and polyps embedded in a well-developed coenenchyme.
