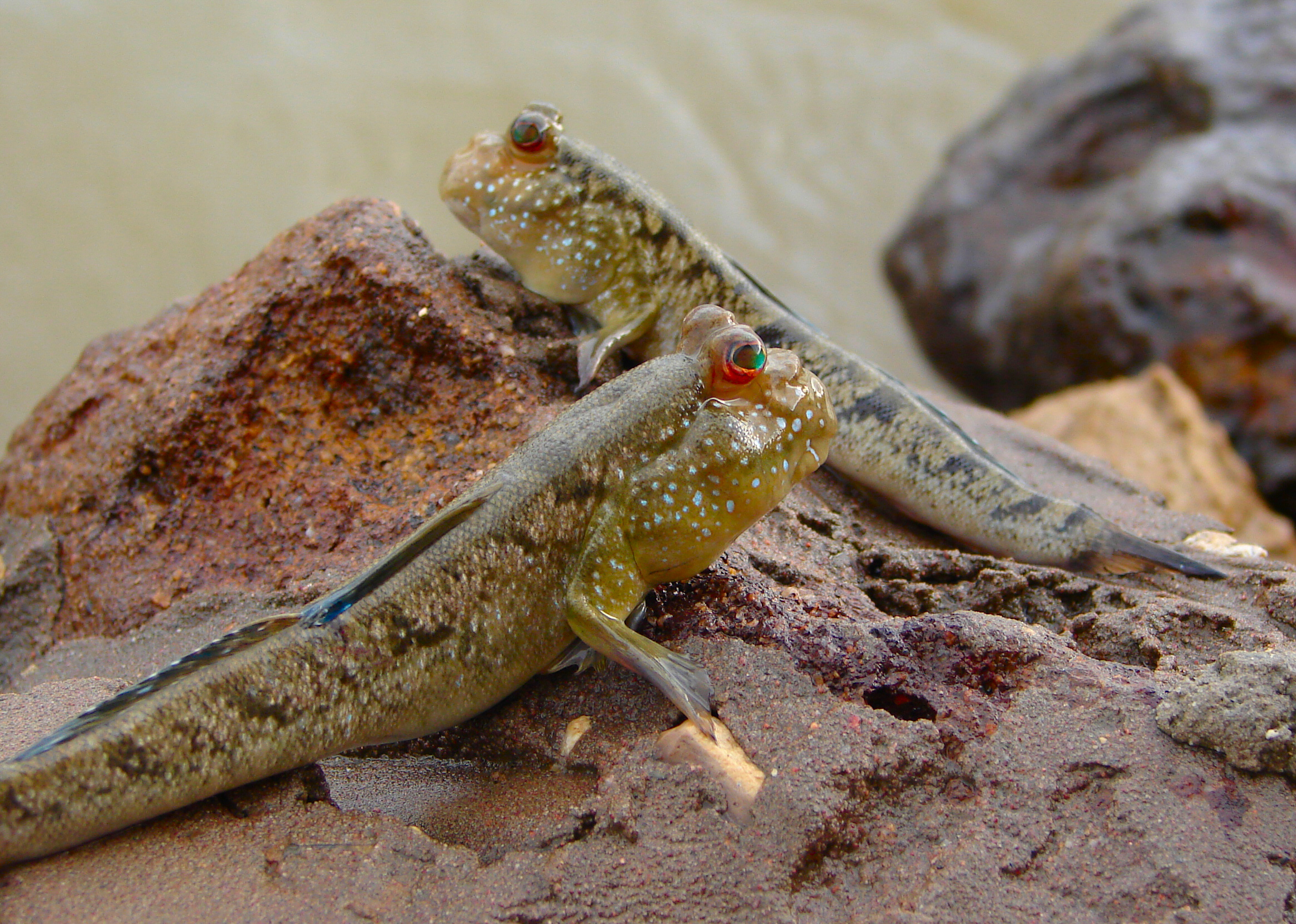
- Atlantic mudskippers (Periophthalmus barbarus) from Gambia

Conservation status
- Least Concern (IUCN 3.1)

Scientific classification
- Kingdom: Animalia
- Phylum: Chordata
- Class: Actinopterygii
- Order: Gobiiformes
- Family: Oxudercidae
- Genus: Periophthalmus
- Species: P. barbarus

Binomial name
- Periophthalmus barbarus (Linnaeus, 1766)

Synonyms
- Gobius barbarus Linnaeus, 1766; Gobius koelreuteri Pallas, 1770; Periophtalmus koelreuteri (Pallas, 1770); Periophthalmus koelreuteri (Pallas, 1770); Periophthalmus papilio Bloch & Schneider, 1801; Periophthalmus koelreuteri papilio Bloch & Schneider, 1801; Periophthalmus gabonicus Duméril, 1861; Periophthalmus erythronemus Guichenot, 1858

= Atlantic mudskipper =

Species of fish

The Atlantic mudskipper (Periophthalmus barbarus) is a species of mudskipper native to fresh, marine, and brackish waters of the tropical Atlantic coasts of Africa, including most offshore islands. The Greek scientific name Periophthalmus barbarus is named after the eyes that provide the Atlantic mudskipper with a wide field of vision. The Atlantic mudskipper is a member of the genus Periophthalmus, which includes oxudercine gobies that have one row of canine-like teeth.

The Atlantic mudskipper can grow up to 25 cm (9.8 in) in body length. Similar to other members of the genus, it has dorsally positioned eyes and pectoral fins that aid in locomotion on land and in water. Atlantic mudskippers can skip, crawl, and climb on land using their pelvic and pectoral fins.

The Atlantic mudskipper is a semi-aquatic animal that occurs on tidal flats and mangrove forests, where it readily crosses mud and sand surfaces out of the water. The Atlantic mudskipper is carnivorous and utilises an ambushing strategy to capture prey. This involves using a 'hydrodynamic tongue' and water to suction the prey into the mouth.

Sexual maturity is reached at approximately 10.2 cm (4.0 in) for females and 10.8 cm (4.3 in) for males, making it one of the largest species of mudskippers. The Atlantic mudskipper can live up to 15 years. Atlantic mudskippers have been used by humans for food, bait, and medicinal purposes. The conservation status of the Atlantic mudskipper is classified as 'Least Concern'.

== Distribution ==
Atlantic mudskippers are found throughout West Africa, in mangrove swamps, and primarily brackish bodies of water near the coast. Countries where the mudskipper are found include Angola, the Democratic Republic of the Congo, Cameroon, and Ghana.

The distribution of Atlantic mudskippers within these regions are influenced by the availability of food and shelter. The distribution may also be influenced by the Atlantic mudskipper's hibernation.

== Etymology ==
The scientific name Periophthalmus barbarus originates from Greek, where peri means 'around', and ophthalmos means 'eye', in reference to the Atlantic mudskipper's close-set eyes that provide it with a larger field of vision. In Greek, barbarus means 'foreign', potentially named after the foreign characteristics it has when compared to other gobies. The generic name 'mudskipper', is labelled after the 'skipping' movement on mudflats.

== Taxonomy ==
The Atlantic mudskippers are classified under oxudercine gobies, all of which live both on land and in water. Atlantic mudskippers dig burrows to seek refuge and reproduce. Previously, the Oxudercidae family was described as a one-species family, where members of the family were collectively named the species Oxuderces dentatus. Oxudercinae species are small to medium in body size, with an elongated body that is covered by small and smooth scales. Members of the Oxudercinae subfamily can also be identified through their dorsally positioned eyes and pointed teeth that resemble canine teeth. The dorsal, pectoral, and pelvic fins have spines, the number of which varies.

There are 12 species within the genus Periophthalmus. The genus Periophthalmus can be identified from other genera of the Oxudercinae subfamily through the teeth, that are present in a single row along the upper jaw. Species of Periophthalmus also have a maximum of 16 spines on the pectoral fins. All Periophthalmus live in environments that have either mangroves or mudflats.

Atlantic mudskippers are distinguished from other members of Periophthalmus by either having no spots or some white spots on their back. Additionally, the Atlantic mudskipper can also be identified by counting the scales along its sides, which total to more than 90 scales. The initial identification and description of the species was outlined by Carl Linnaeus, published in 1766 as Gobius barbarus and renamed to Periophthalmus barbarus. The Atlantic mudskipper has also previously been known or misidentified as Gobius koelreuteri, Periophthalmus papilio, Periophthalmus gabonicus, Periophthalmus erythronemus.

== Anatomy and morphology ==
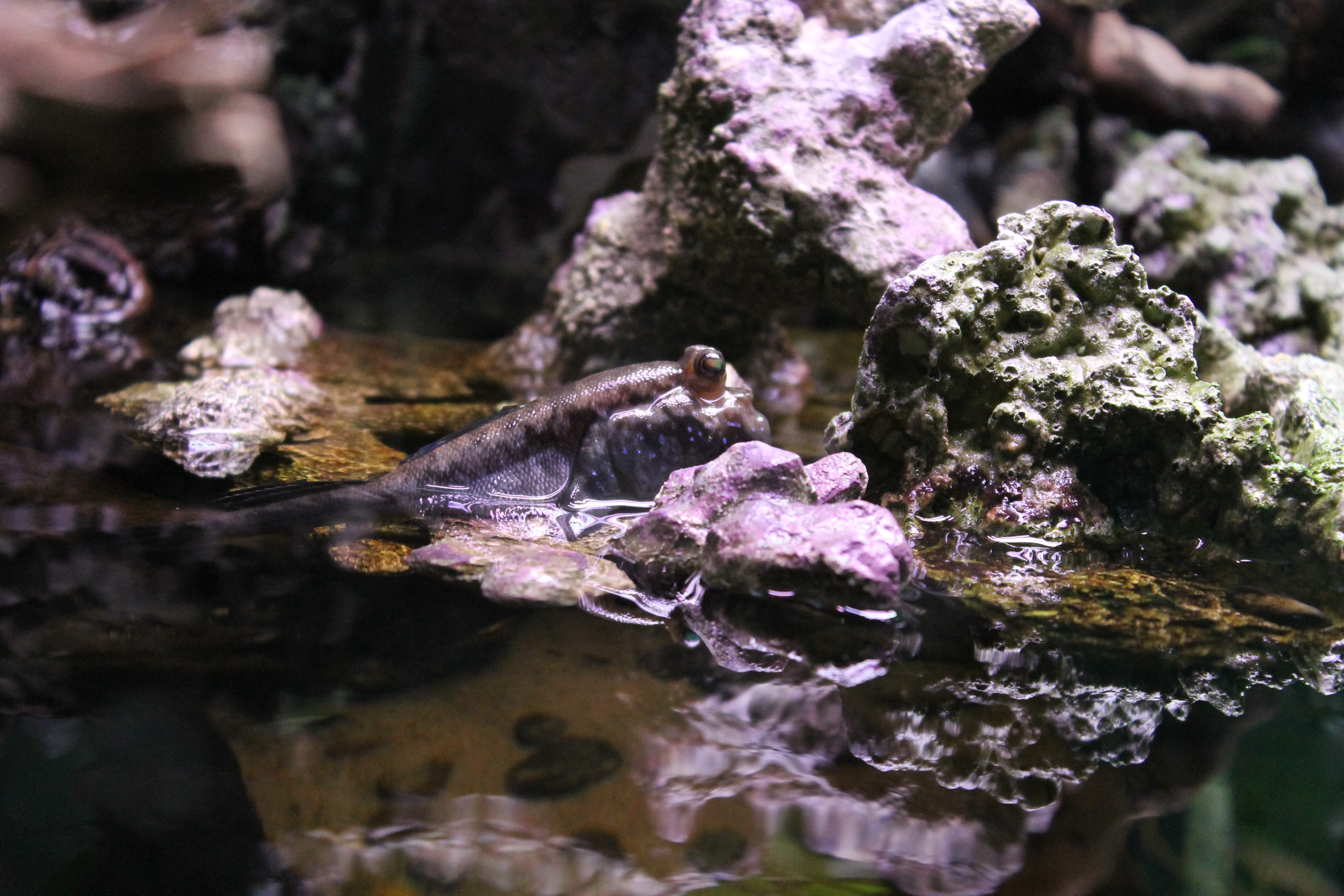
Side view of the Atlantic mudskipper propped up on land using pectoral fins

The Atlantic mudskipper can grow up to 16 cm in length. The body is covered with scales, coated with a mucus layer that helps to retain moisture. The Atlantic mudskippers have more than 90 scales along the side of their body. Atlantic mudskippers also retain moisture by storing water within gill chambers, that allows them to breathe when out of water. Atlantic mudskippers do not have a membrane that covers the gill chambers; instead, they are able to control the opening and closing of the gill chambers. The gill chambers may be controlled through either the muscles around the slits, or through the differences in partial pressures. In addition to retaining moisture by storing water, the surface of the Atlantic mudskipper enables it to breathe through its skin, otherwise known as cutaneous respiration.

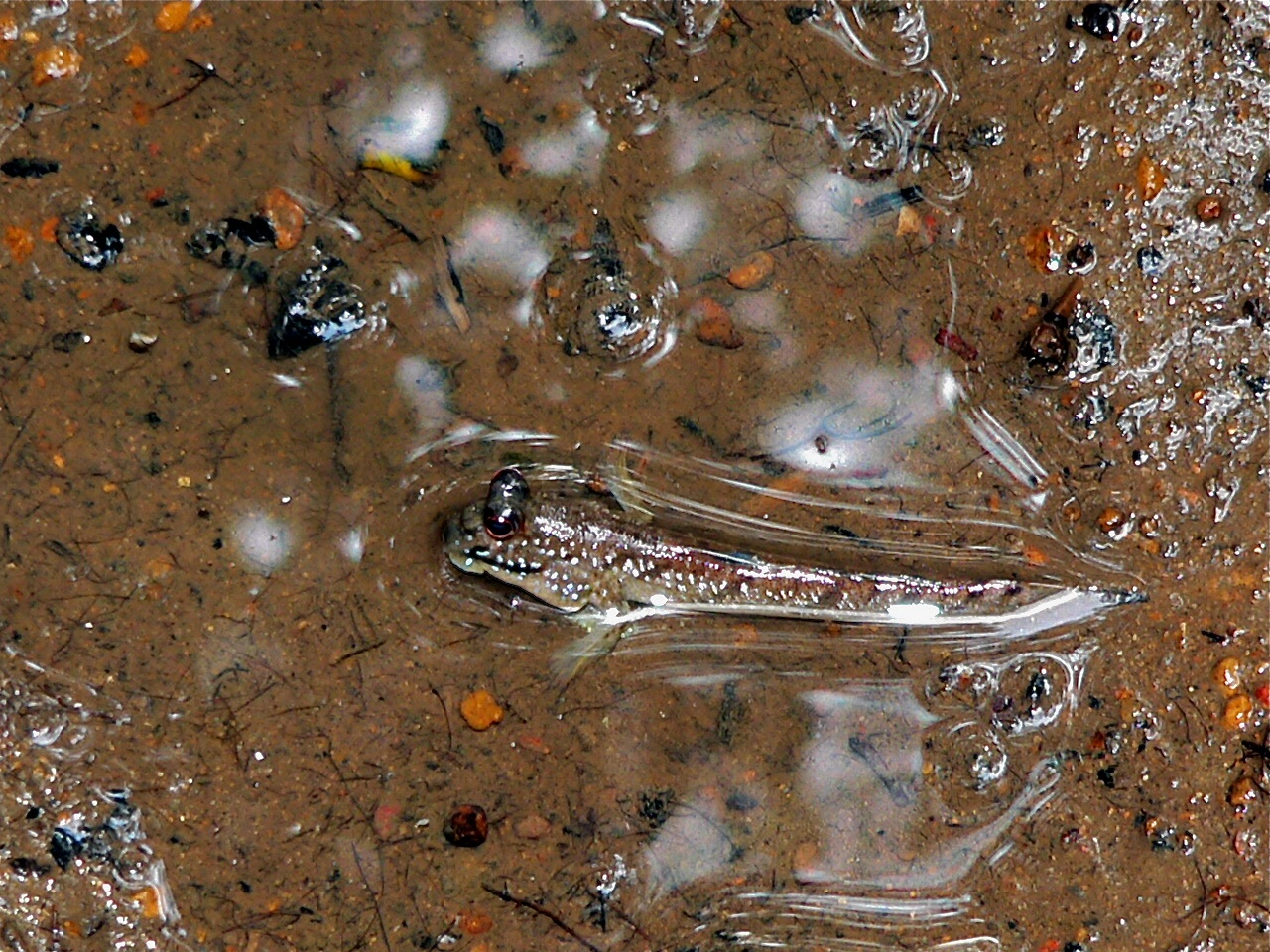
Aerial view of the Atlantic mudskipper propped up on land using pectoral fins

Mudskippers have a pair of pectoral fins, which allows them to 'skip' on land and maintain stability within water. The Atlantic mudskipper also has a pair of caudal fins that aid in aquatic locomotion, and pelvic fins that aid the pectoral fins in terrestrial locomotion. The pelvic fins are adapted to terrestrial living by acting as a sucker to attach the Atlantic mudskipper to land. Atlantic mudskippers can also crawl and climb on land using their pelvic and pectoral fins.

The eyes of the Atlantic mudskipper are adapted to terrestrial living by being located close together, providing the mudskipper with a large field of vision. The eyes can move independent of each other at 360 degrees. The eyes are also positioned further up on the head, enabling the eyes to remain above the water surface whilst their body is submerged underwater. Cup-like structures that hold water are located beneath the eye, which aids in lubricating the eyes when the Atlantic mudskipper is on land. While on land, they perform a whole-body rolling behavior in which their eyes are retracted and the dermal cup structures cover them, such that the dermal cup membrane comes into contact with fluids on the surface they are rolling on. When they finish the roll, their eyes extend again and the dermal cup recedes. This rolling behavior may capture water in these cups and body for lubrication, supported by the fact that they were observed to roll much more frequently when exposed to higher air flow (and thus, higher evaporation) in a laboratory setting. The Atlantic mudskipper has chemosensory receptors that are located within the nose and on the skin's surface.

The Atlantic mudskipper has the ability to rotate its mouth opening so that its jaws can be oriented over prey. Sharp teeth, reflective of their carnivorous diet, are present within the mouth. Atlantic mudskippers have a short digestive system, that is composed of an oesophagus, stomach, intestine, and rectum. The stomach was historically not described in Atlantic mudskippers as it is not well defined unless structures are compared microscopically. The surface of the intestine is folded, which increases the surface area that enhances the absorption of nutrients.

The Atlantic mudskipper has a unique olfactory organ that includes a canal 0.3mm in diameter near its upper lip that increases in size into a chamber-like sac. The chamber-like sacs only serve a mechanical purpose, which is to circulate water through the canals, which are sensory structures.

The Atlantic mudskippers have genital papillae that are located on the abdomen. Females can be distinguished from males, who have less rounded papillae.

== Ecology and behaviour ==
=== Habitat ===
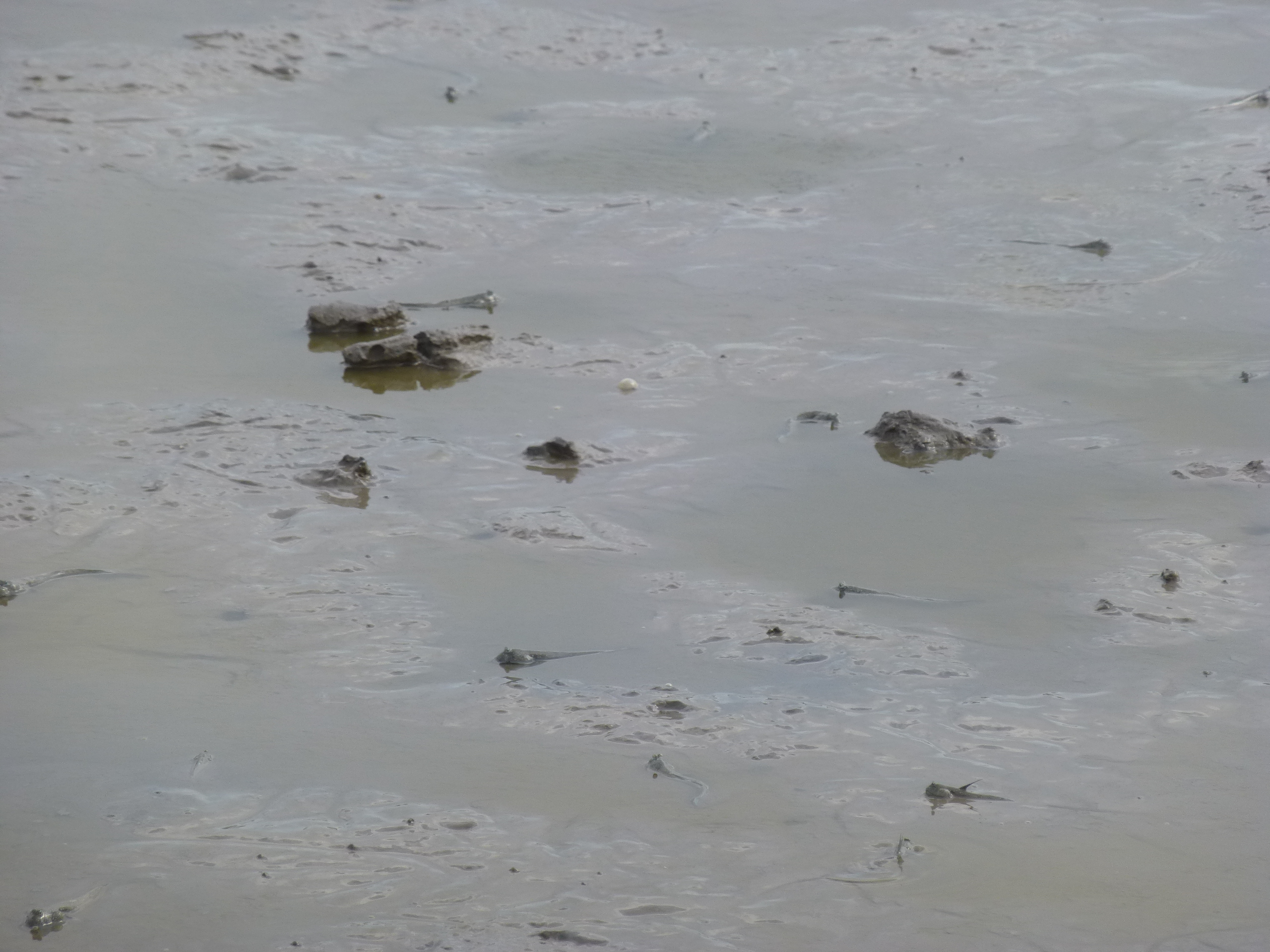
Partially submerged mudskippers.

Atlantic mudskippers are semi-aquatic animals that live in areas with water that is slightly salty, such as river estuaries and mudflats. Generally, Atlantic mudskippers spend the majority of the day on land. In tidal regions, Atlantic mudskippers may appear only during low tide to feed; conversely, they hide in their burrow at high tide. Their burrows can extend to 1.5 metres deep, in which mudskippers can seek refuge from predators. Burrows may contain a pocket of air which the Atlantic mudskipper can breathe from, despite there being low oxygen availability. The Atlantic mudskipper is generally able to tolerate high concentrations of toxic substances produced by industrial waste, including cyanide and ammonia, in the surrounding environments. For example, in the presence of high ammonia contamination, the Atlantic mudskipper can actively secrete ammonia through its gills within highly acidic environments. They are also able to survive in a variety of environments, including waters with different temperatures and salinity levels.

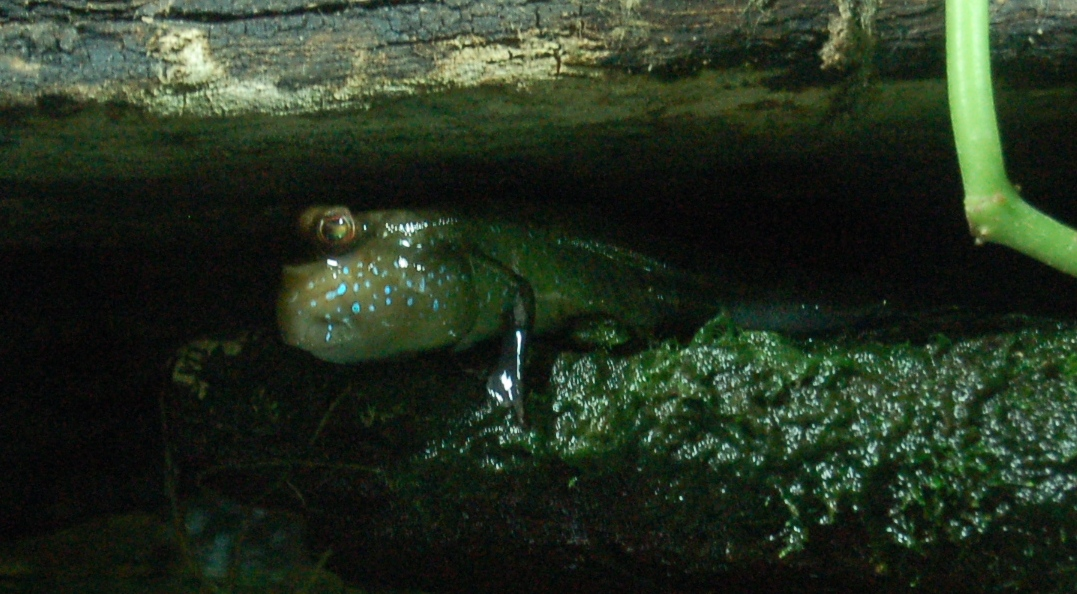
Atlantic mudskipper underwater.

Hot and humid climates are optimal for Atlantic mudskippers as it enhances cutaneous respiration and helps them with maintaining their body temperature. The body temperature of Atlantic mudskippers on the surface can range from 14 to 35 degrees celsius. The Atlantic mudskipper is territorial and builds a wall of mud around its territory and its resources. The territory is approximately 1 metre long and can aid in maintaining Atlantic mudskipper populations by storing food resources.

=== Predator-prey behaviour ===
The Atlantic mudskipper is carnivorous, and has adopted an ambushing strategy to capture terrestrial prey. While hunting, the Atlantic mudskipper submerges itself underwater whilst leaving its eyes out, using only sight to identify and locate prey. To ambush prey, Atlantic mudskippers launch onto land using predominantly their pectoral fins, and catch the prey using their mouth. When Atlantic mudskippers are in danger from predation on land, they proceed into 'flight' behaviour and either jump in the water or skip away on mud.

=== Feeding behaviour ===
On land, the Atlantic mudskipper feeds by covering its prey with water, then sucking back the water and prey into its mouth, named as the 'hydrodynamic tongue'. The Atlantic mudskipper carries water in their mouth prior to emerging on land, enabling them to feed. In water, the Atlantic mudskipper feeds through suction feeding, similar to other aquatic species. Suction-feeding involves building up pressure by expanding the head and mouth rapidly, which pulls both food and water in. Although the feeding technique is similar in both environments, the Atlantic mudskipper alters the force of suction, such that the flow underwater is stronger than on land. The gape size of the mouth is larger in water, potentially due to water pressure. Furthermore, the Atlantic mudskipper lunges simultaneously as suctioning, in order to catch prey. The direction of the lunge is different between terrains. The Atlantic mudskipper catches prey horizontally underwater; whereas, the Atlantic mudskipper rotates its body and reorientates its mouth on land, such that it feeds on prey from above. The Atlantic mudskippers are diurnal, which means they are active and feed during the day.

Atlantic mudskippers are flexible in regard to their diet choices. Larger Atlantic mudskippers ingest larger-sized prey, potentially due to the correlation between their mouth gape and prey size. The feeding choices also may vary by habitats and seasonally, depending on what resources are most abundant. The Atlantic mudskippers feed more during dry season than wet, reflective of the optimal foraging theory, which proposes that diet flexibility increases with lower food availability. Atlantic mudskippers feed frequently, where larger Atlantic mudskippers feed at higher intensities as they are less prone to predation.

==== Diet ====
The Atlantic mudskipper is a consumer of a wide variety of food. In the wild, mudskippers prefer to eat worms, crickets, flies, mealworms, beetles, small fish, and small crustaceans (sesarmid crabs). Mudskippers kept as pets can eat frozen fare such as bloodworm or artemia and flakes. It cannot eat dried food; however, because its stomach swells up. It is recommended to feed it frozen food for a healthy diet.

== Reproduction ==
Females reach sexual maturity at a body length of around 10.2 cm, and males approximately 10.8 cm. The Atlantic mudskipper can spawn throughout the year. However, spawning mainly occurs for male Atlantic mudskippers between February and May, and females between March and May. The peak spawning times are associated with high food availability for their young. The fertility of Atlantic mudskippers increases with the length of their body, as females may be able to carry more eggs at larger sizes. Females lay thousands of eggs at one time; however, the eggs are highly prone to predation. Mudskippers flood their burrows to trigger the eggs to hatch. Only a small proportion of offspring survive as they are highly susceptible to predation.

During courtship, after the male pairs with a female mudskipper, the male and female go into the male's burrow to mate. After the female releases her eggs onto the burrow wall, the male displays a large amount of paternal care. The male Atlantic mudskipper will guard and take care of the eggs within the burrow.

=== Lifecycle ===
The average lifespan of an Atlantic mudskipper is approximately five years. The egg laid by the mother in the burrow will hatch into larvae that swim out of the burrow and drift for 30–50 days. As Atlantic mudskippers are territorial, juvenile mudskippers will hide in mud until they are grown enough to protect their established territory.

== Usage by humans ==
The Atlantic mudskippers are used by humans as food, bait, ornamental fishes, and for medicine. It is important to local indigenous peoples as a food fish and can also be found in the aquarium trade. Fishing has caused population declines in parts of the species' range. Mudskippers can be used as a bio-indicator of pollution in marine ecosystems as they are sensitive to the environment and have an absorptive body. Analyses can be performed by examining various organs of the mudskipper. The digestive system, gills, and skin are common places of the Atlantic mudskipper that are contaminated by heavy metals, like copper and iron. A less invasive method of using mudskippers as a bio-indicator is to use their growth and development as a measure for potential contamination.

== Threats and conservation ==
The conservation status of the Atlantic mudskipper is currently classified as a species of 'Least Concern.' Declines in Atlantic mudskipper populations may be a result of overfishing, unregulated pollution, and unsuitable fishing methods, for instance, electric fishing. The Atlantic mudskipper is also threatened by the increase in urban development within its habitat.

Although mudskippers have been found to be able to tolerate cyanide in environments, the use of cyanide can be fatal to all life stages of the Atlantic mudskipper. On the other hand, pollution may also cause a change in distribution of the mudskippers, resulting in local population decline. Changes to the abundance of Atlantic mudskippers can lead to cascading effects, by influencing the abundance of predators and prey of the Atlantic mudskipper.

Different indigenous populations and cultures have applied various conservation practices in order to conserve the Atlantic mudskipper. The Higaonons do not use unsustainable fishing methods and cyanide, in an effort to conserve the Atlantic mudskippers and other effected aquatic organisms in their area. In Iligan city, Atlantic mudskippers can only be fished from a few locations.

Some Atlantic mudskippers are distributed in regions where there is land and water protection. The current recommended conservation actions include managing the number of Atlantic mudskippers caught when fishing.
