= Platytomus pachypus =

Scientific classification
- Kingdom: Animalia
- Phylum: Arthropoda
- Clade: Pancrustacea
- Class: Insecta
- Order: Coleoptera
- Suborder: Polyphaga
- Infraorder: Scarabaeiformia
- Family: Scarabaeidae
- Genus: Platytomus
- Species: P. pachypus

Binomial name
- Platytomus pachypus (Lea, 1923)

Synonyms
- Psammodius pachypus Lea, 1923

Species of beetle

Platytomus pachypus is a species of beetle of the family Scarabaeidae. It is found in Australia (Lord Howe Island) and New Caledonia.
