= Platytomus freudei =

Scientific classification
- Kingdom: Animalia
- Phylum: Arthropoda
- Clade: Pancrustacea
- Class: Insecta
- Order: Coleoptera
- Suborder: Polyphaga
- Infraorder: Scarabaeiformia
- Family: Scarabaeidae
- Genus: Platytomus
- Species: P. freudei

Binomial name
- Platytomus freudei (Balthasar, 1960)

Synonyms
- Diastictus freudei Balthasar, 1960

Species of beetle

Platytomus freudei is a species of beetle of the family Scarabaeidae. It is found in Argentina, Bolivia, Brazil (Amazonas, Mato Grosso, Mato Grosso do Sul, Rio Grande do Sul, Santa Catarina).

== Description ==
Adults reach a length of about 2–2.4 mm (0.079–0.094 in). The body is light to dark testaceous.
