= Platytomus brasiliensis =

Scientific classification
- Kingdom: Animalia
- Phylum: Arthropoda
- Clade: Pancrustacea
- Class: Insecta
- Order: Coleoptera
- Suborder: Polyphaga
- Infraorder: Scarabaeiformia
- Family: Scarabaeidae
- Genus: Platytomus
- Species: P. brasiliensis

Binomial name
- Platytomus brasiliensis Rakovič, Mencl & Král, 2020

Species of beetle

Platytomus brasiliensis is a species of beetle of the family Scarabaeidae. It is found in Brazil (Mato Grosso, Minas Gerais, Paraná).

== Description ==
Adults reach a length of about 2.2–2.3 mm (0.087–0.091 in). The body is piceous and the head is has weakly elevated granules. These granules are restricted to the anterior third of the clypeus. The clypeus is emarginate and the frontoclypeal suture is fine. The pronotum is densely punctured by fine and coarse punctures. The elytra have deep striae and the interstriae are weakly convex.
