= Platytomus laevistriatus =

Scientific classification
- Kingdom: Animalia
- Phylum: Arthropoda
- Clade: Pancrustacea
- Class: Insecta
- Order: Coleoptera
- Suborder: Polyphaga
- Infraorder: Scarabaeiformia
- Family: Scarabaeidae
- Genus: Platytomus
- Species: P. laevistriatus

Binomial name
- Platytomus laevistriatus (Perris, 1869)

Synonyms
- Psammodius laevistriatus Perris, 1869; Pleurophorus (Platytomus) proximus Reitter, 1892; Psammodius poricollis Fairmaire, 1870

Species of beetle

Platytomus laevistriatus is a species of beetle of the family Scarabaeidae. It is found in Algeria, Egypt, France (Corsica), Italy (Sardinia, Sicily), Libya, Malta, Morocco and Tunisia.

== Description ==
Adults reach a length of about 3–3.5 mm (0.12–0.14 in). They have an elongated, fairly parallel-sided, shiny, reddish-brown to blackish-brown body, with the anterior margin of the head and the legs lighter reddish-brown.
