= Platytomus tibialis =

Scientific classification
- Kingdom: Animalia
- Phylum: Arthropoda
- Clade: Pancrustacea
- Class: Insecta
- Order: Coleoptera
- Suborder: Polyphaga
- Infraorder: Scarabaeiformia
- Family: Scarabaeidae
- Genus: Platytomus
- Species: P. tibialis

Binomial name
- Platytomus tibialis (Fabricius, 1798)

Synonyms
- Scarabaeus tibialis Fabricius, 1798; Psammodius grundeli Van Dyke, 1918; Pleurophorus ovipennis Desbrochers des Loges, 1884; Psammodius insculptus Küster, 1849; Platytomus sabulosus Mulsant, 1842

Species of beetle

Platytomus tibialis is a species of beetle of the family Scarabaeidae.

== Description ==
Adults reach a length of about 3–4 mm (0.12–0.16 in). They have an elongate-oval, shiny, blackish-brown body, with the anterior margin of the head, the anterior angles of the pronotum and sometimes the entire elytra lighter reddish-brown. The legs are yellowish-red.

== Distribution ==
Australian: Australia (Northern Territory, Queensland). Palaearctic: Albania, Algeria, Azores, Bosnia Herzegovina, Canary Islands, Croatia, Cyprus, Egypt, France (Corsica), Greece, Israel, Italy (Sicily, Sardinia), Lebanon, Libya, Madeira, Malta, Montenegro, Morocco, Romania, Syria, Tunisia, Turkey, Ukraine. Nearctic: United States (California). Neotropical: Mexico (Nayarit).
