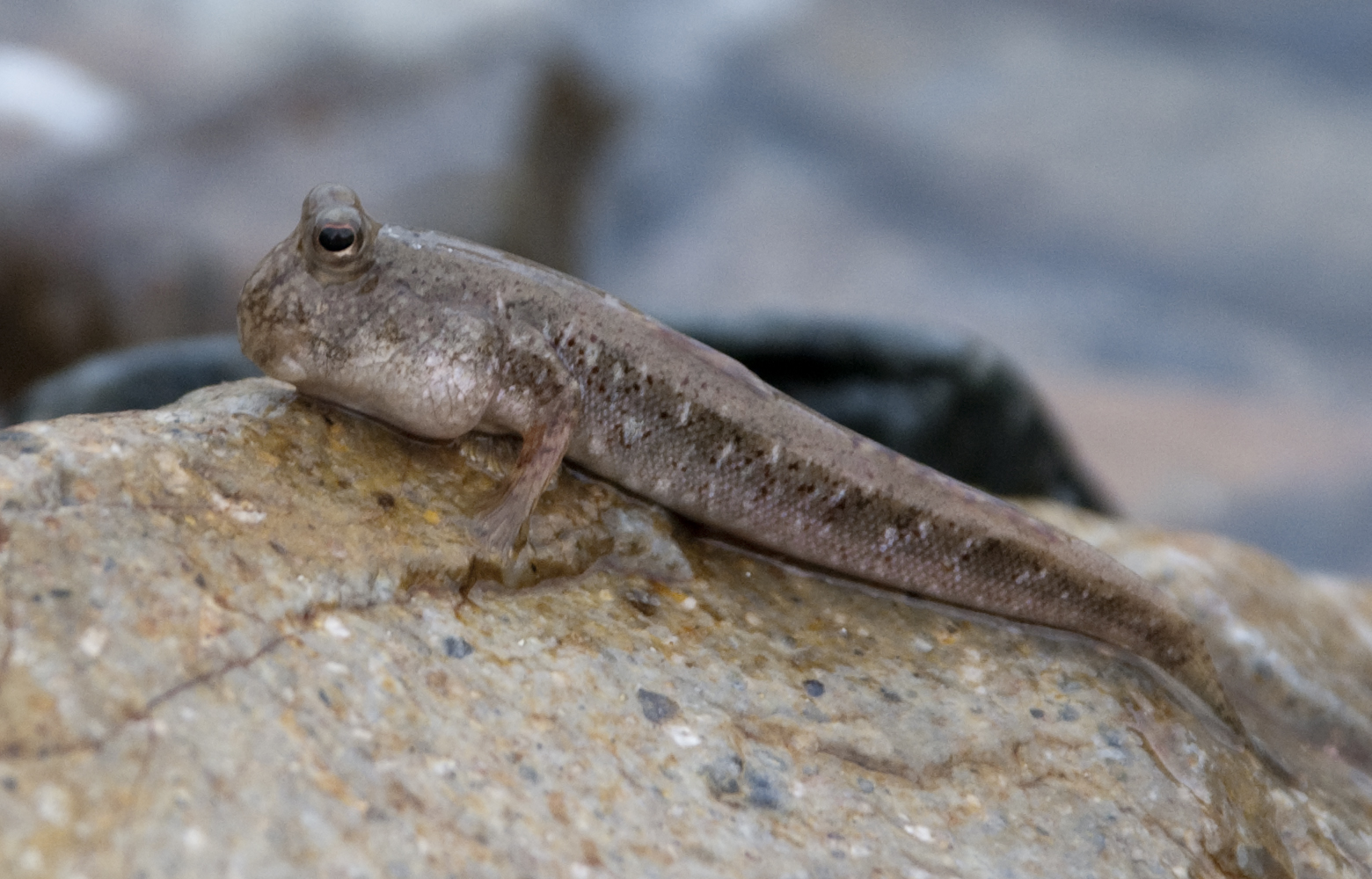

Scientific classification
- Domain: Eukaryota
- Kingdom: Animalia
- Phylum: Chordata
- Class: Actinopterygii
- Order: Gobiiformes
- Family: Oxudercidae
- Genus: Periophthalmus
- Species: P. novaeguineaensis

Binomial name
- Periophthalmus novaeguineaensis Eggert, 1935

Synonyms
- Periophthalmus cantonensis novaeguineaensis Eggert, 1935; Periophthalmus expeditionium Whitley, 1953; Periophthalmus murdyi Larson & Takita, 2004

= New Guinea mudskipper =

Species of fish

The New Guinea mudskipper (Periophthalmus novaeguineaensis) is a species of mudskippers native to fresh and brackish waters along the coasts of Australia and Indonesia. This species occurs in estuaries and tidal creeks as well as mangrove forests and nipa palm stands This species can reach a length of 8 centimetres (3.1 in) SL.
