= Platytomus bordati =

Scientific classification
- Kingdom: Animalia
- Phylum: Arthropoda
- Clade: Pancrustacea
- Class: Insecta
- Order: Coleoptera
- Suborder: Polyphaga
- Infraorder: Scarabaeiformia
- Family: Scarabaeidae
- Genus: Platytomus
- Species: P. bordati

Binomial name
- Platytomus bordati Rakovič, Mencl & Král, 2020

Species of beetle

Platytomus bordati is a species of beetle of the family Scarabaeidae. It is found in Brazil (Bahia, Distrito Federal).

== Description ==
Adults reach a length of about 2.1–2.4 mm (0.083–0.094 in). The body is piceous and the head is granulate, with the granules reaching the anterior half of the clypeus. The clypeus is emarginate and the frontoclypeal suture is finely impressed. The pronotum has coarse and fine punctures. The elytra have deep striae and the interstriae are convex.

== Life history ==
Specimens were collected at light at altitudes up to 1100 metres.
