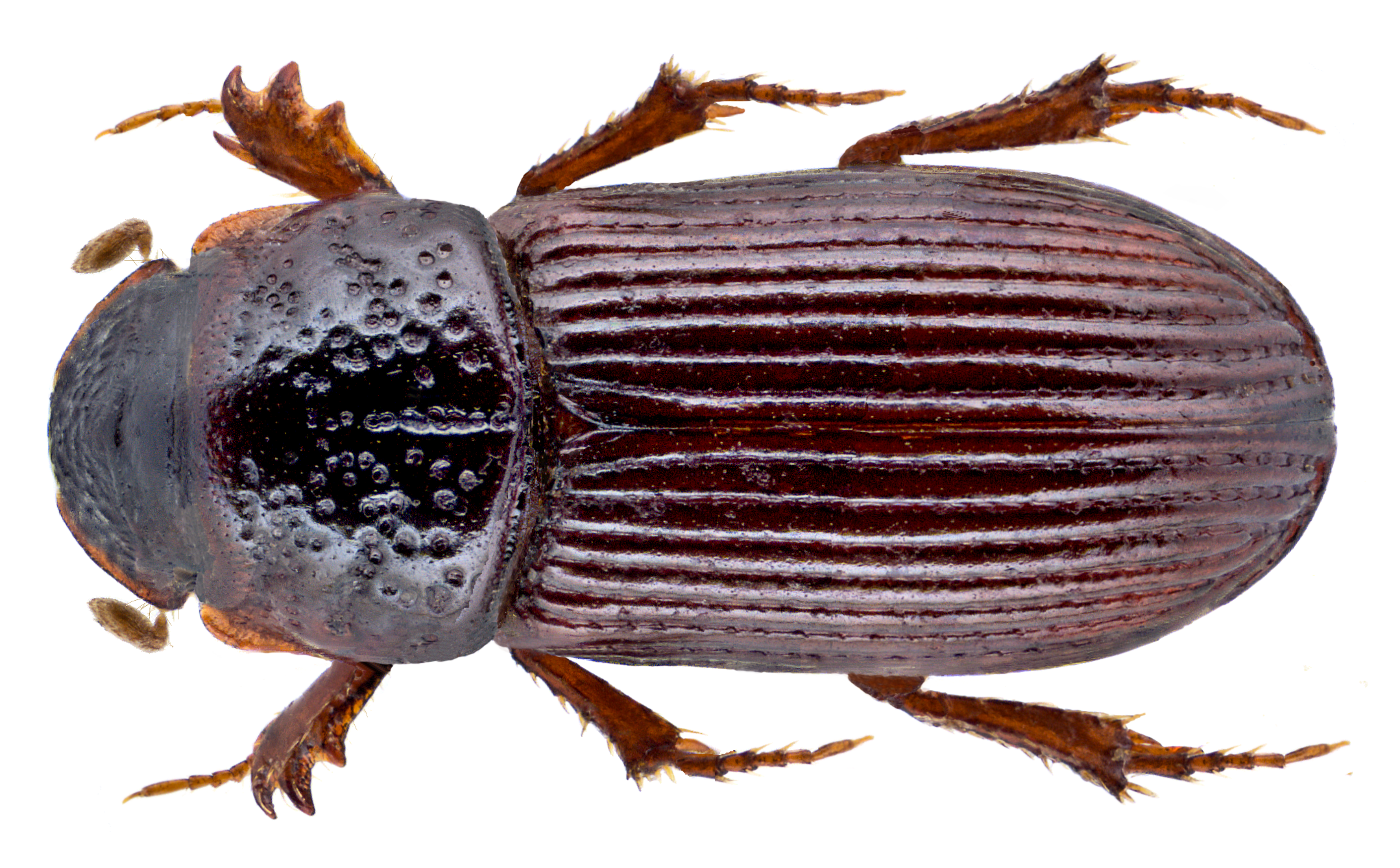
- Platytomus variolosus

Scientific classification
- Kingdom: Animalia
- Phylum: Arthropoda
- Clade: Pancrustacea
- Class: Insecta
- Order: Coleoptera
- Suborder: Polyphaga
- Infraorder: Scarabaeiformia
- Family: Scarabaeidae
- Tribe: Psammodiini
- Genus: Platytomus; Mulsant, 1842

= Platytomus =

Genus of beetles

Platytomus is a genus of aphodiine dung beetles in the family Scarabaeidae. There are more than 20 described species in Platytomus.

== Species ==
These 26 species belong to the genus Platytomus:

- Platytomus antipodum (Fauvel, 1903)
- Platytomus ashantii (Endrödi, 1973)
- Platytomus atlanticus (Cartwright, 1948)
- Platytomus bordati Rakovič, Mencl & Král, 2020
- Platytomus brasiliensis Rakovič, Mencl & Král, 2020
- Platytomus caelicollis (Cartwright, 1948)
- Platytomus darwini (Cartwright, 1970)
- Platytomus freudei (Balthasar, 1960)
- Platytomus gomyi Pittino & Mariani, 1986
- Platytomus gregalis (Cartwright, 1948)
- Platytomus grisoli (Paulian, 1942)
- Platytomus hawaiiensis (Rakovic, 1981)
- Platytomus indicus (Balthasar, 1941)
- Platytomus jailensis (Apostolov & Maltzev, 1986)
- Platytomus laevistriatus (Perris, 1869)
- Platytomus longulus (Cartwright, 1948)
- Platytomus micros (Bates, 1887)
- Platytomus mongolicus (Medvedev, 1974)
- Platytomus nagporensis Pittino & Mariani, 1986
- Platytomus nathani Pittino & Mariani, 1986
- Platytomus notialis (Cartwright, 1948)
- Platytomus obscurior (Blackburn, 1904)
- Platytomus pachypus (Lea, 1923)
- Platytomus parvulus (Chevrolat, 1864)
- Platytomus pumilio (Balthasar, 1966)
- Platytomus tibialis (Fabricius, 1798)
- Platytomus variolosus (Kolenati, 1846)
- Platytomus yadai (Ochi, Kawahara & Inagaki, 2006)
