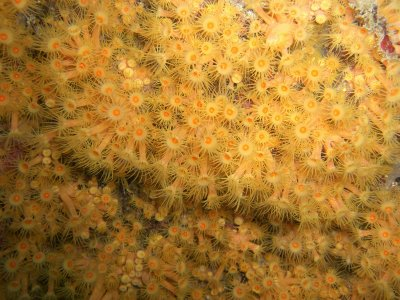
- Parazoanthus axinellae

Scientific classification
- Domain: Eukaryota
- Kingdom: Animalia
- Phylum: Cnidaria
- Subphylum: Anthozoa
- Class: Hexacorallia
- Order: Zoantharia
- Family: Parazoanthidae
- Genus: Parazoanthus; Haddon & Shackleton, 1891

Species
- See text

= Parazoanthus =

Genus of sea anemones

Parazoanthus is a genus of anemone-like anthozoans in the order Zoantharia.

== Species ==
The following species are recognized in the genus Parazoanthus:

- Parazoanthus aliceae Carreiro-Silva, Ocaña, Stanković, Sampaio, Porteiro, Fabri & Stefanni, 2017
- Parazoanthus anguicomus (Norman, 1868)
- Parazoanthus antarcticus Carlgren, 1927
- Parazoanthus aruensis Pax, 1911
- Parazoanthus axinellae (Schmidt, 1862)
- Parazoanthus capensis Carlgren, 1938
- Parazoanthus darwini Reimer & Fujii, 2010
- Parazoanthus dichroicus Haddon A.C. & Shackleton A.M. 1891
- Parazoanthus douglasi Haddon & Shackleton, 1891
- Parazoanthus elongatus McMurrich, 1904
- Parazoanthus haddoni Carlgren, 1913
- Parazoanthus juan-fernandezii Carlgren, 1922
- Parazoanthus lividum Cutress, 1971
- Parazoanthus swiftii (Duchassaing & Michelotti, 1860)
