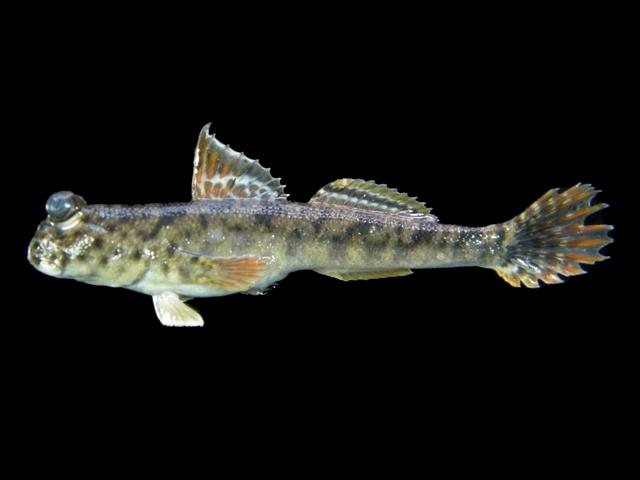
- Periophthalmus variabilis
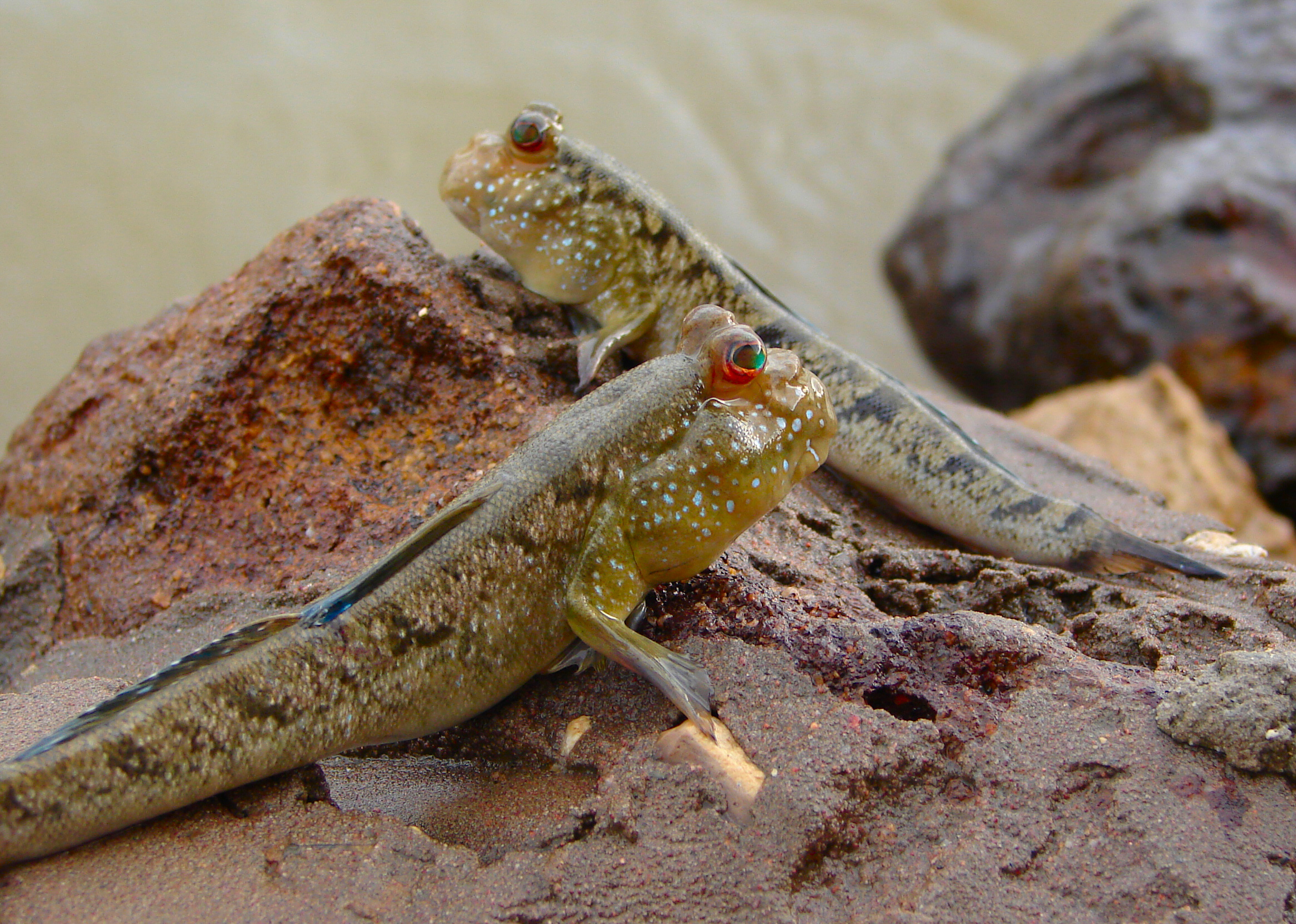
- Periophthalmus barbarus

Scientific classification
- Kingdom: Animalia
- Phylum: Chordata
- Class: Actinopterygii
- Division: Teleostei
- Order: Gobiiformes
- Family: Oxudercidae
- Subfamily: Oxudercinae
- Genus: Periophthalmus; Bloch & J. G. Schneider, 1801

Type species
- Periophthalmus papilio Bloch & J. G. Schneider, 1801

Synonyms
- Euchoristopus Gill, 1863

= Periophthalmus =

Genus of fishes

Periophthalmus (mud jumper) is a genus of fish in the family Oxudercidae that is native to coastal mangrove woods and shrubland in the Indo-Pacific region, except for P. barbarus, which lives on the Atlantic coast of Africa. It is one of the genera commonly known as mudskippers. Periophthalmus fishes are remarkable for using limited terrestrial locomotion and jumping to live temporarily out of water to feed on insects and small invertebrates. All Periophthalmus species are aggressive and territorial.

== Species ==
There are currently 19 recognized species in this genus

- Periophthalmus argentilineatus Valenciennes, 1837 (Barred mudskipper)
- Periophthalmus barbarus (Linnaeus, 1766) (Atlantic mudskipper)
- Periophthalmus chrysospilos Bleeker, 1852
- Periophthalmus darwini Larson & Takita, 2004 (Darwin's mudskipper)
- Periophthalmus gracilis Eggert, 1935 (Graceful mudskipper)
- Periophthalmus kalolo Lesson, 1831 (Common mudskipper)
- Periophthalmus magnuspinnatus Y. J. Lee, Y. Choi & B. S. Ryu, 1995
- Periophthalmus malaccensis Eggert, 1935
- Periophthalmus minutus Eggert, 1935 (Minute mudskipper)
- Periophthalmus modestus Cantor, 1842 (Shuttles mudskipper)
- Periophthalmus novaeguineaensis Eggert, 1935 (New Guinea mudskipper)
- Periophthalmus novemradiatus (F. Hamilton, 1822) (Pearse's mudskipper)
- Periophthalmus pusing Jaafar, Polgar & Zamroni, 2016
- Periophthalmus spilotus Murdy & Takita, 1999
- Periophthalmus takita Jaafar & Larson, 2008 (Takita's mudskipper)
- Periophthalmus variabilis Eggert, 1935
- Periophthalmus walailakae Darumas & Tantichodok, 2002
- Periophthalmus waltoni Koumans, 1941 (Walton's mudskipper)
- Periophthalmus weberi Eggert, 1935 (Weber's mudskipper)
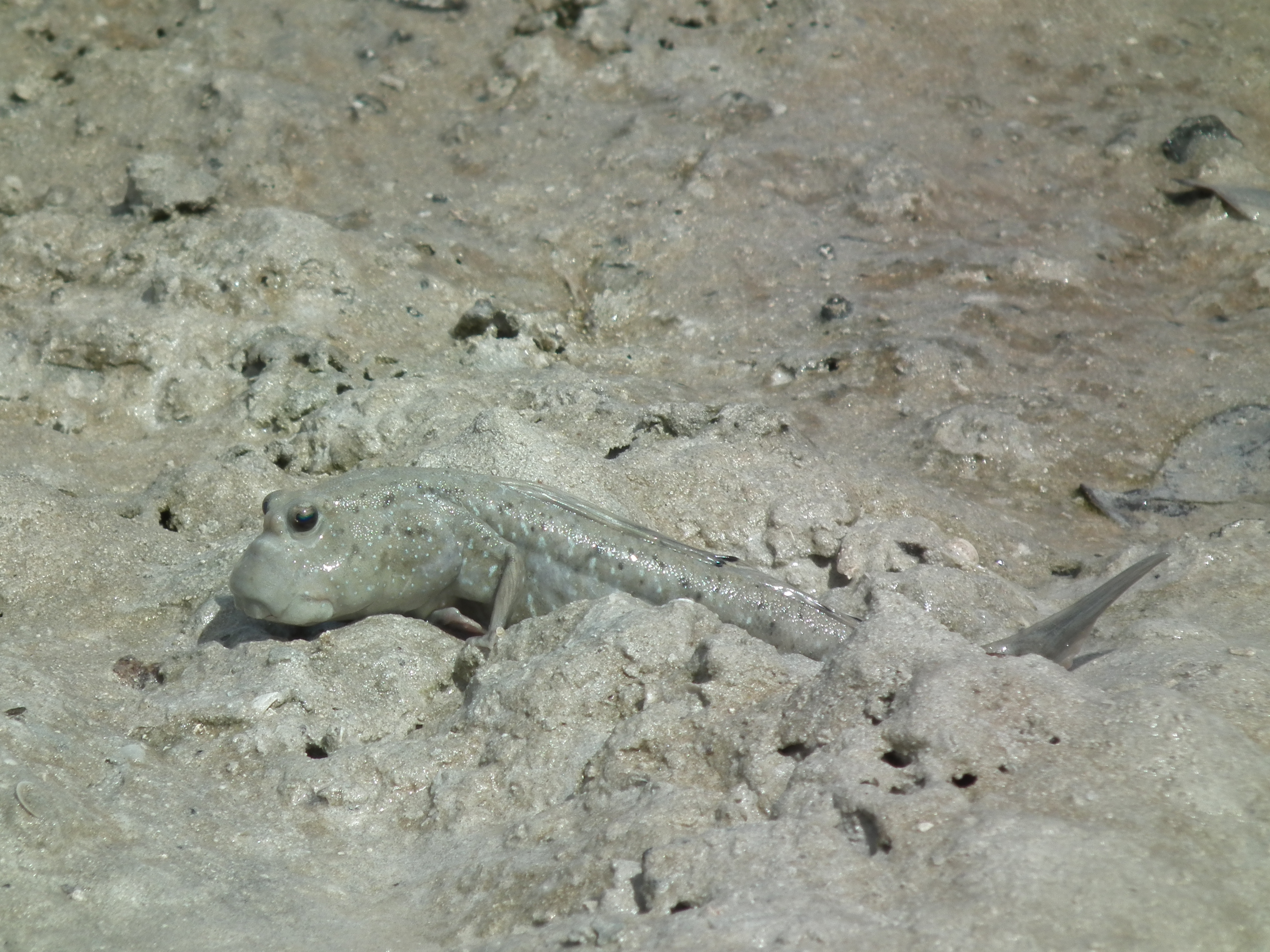
- Periophthalmus waltoni from United Arab Emirates
