= Platytomus indicus =

Scientific classification
- Kingdom: Animalia
- Phylum: Arthropoda
- Clade: Pancrustacea
- Class: Insecta
- Order: Coleoptera
- Suborder: Polyphaga
- Infraorder: Scarabaeiformia
- Family: Scarabaeidae
- Genus: Platytomus
- Species: P. indicus

Binomial name
- Platytomus indicus (Balthasar, 1941)

Synonyms
- Diastictus indicus Balthasar, 1941

Species of beetle

Platytomus indicus is a species of beetle of the family Scarabaeidae. It is found in India (Kerala, Tamil Nadu).

== Description ==
Adults reach a length of about 3 mm (0.12 in). They have a shiny, smooth, brown to reddish-brown body, with the sides of the pronotum, the elytra and the underside lighter yellowish-brown.
