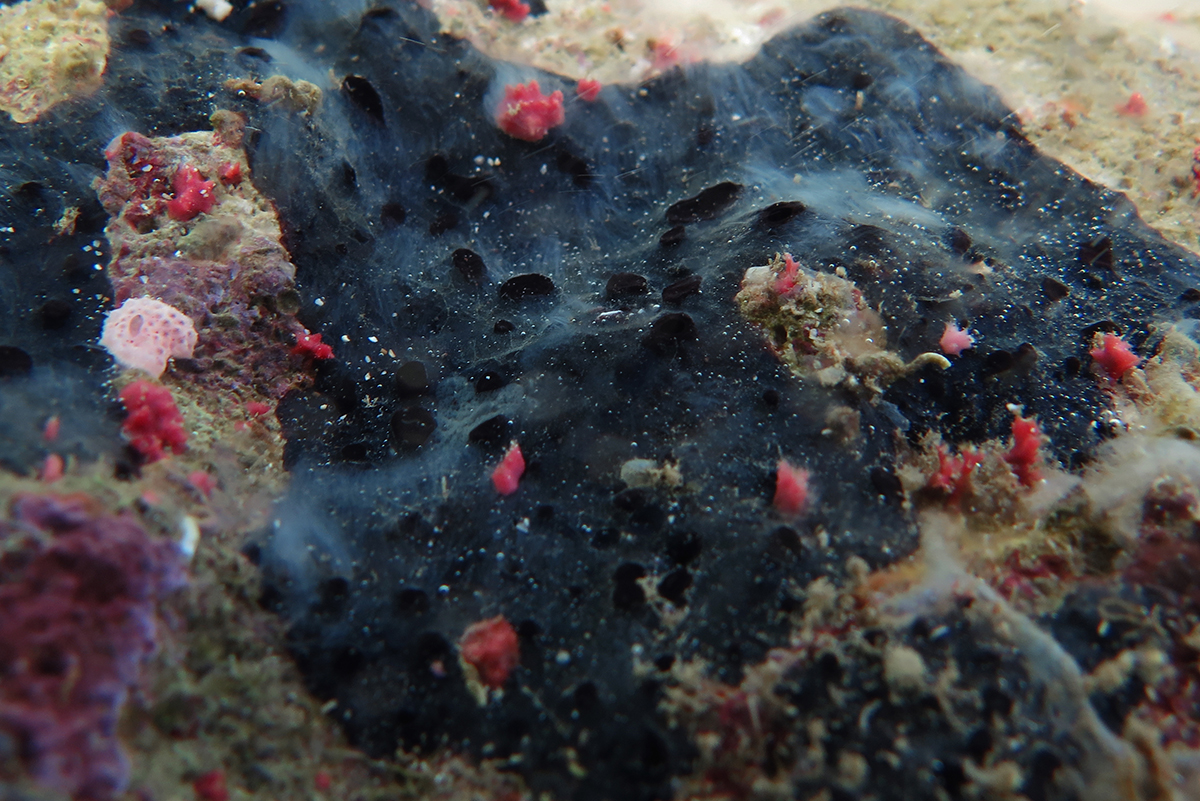
- Iotrochota baculifera

Scientific classification
- Domain: Eukaryota
- Kingdom: Animalia
- Phylum: Porifera
- Class: Demospongiae
- Order: Poecilosclerida
- Family: Iotrochotidae

= Iotrochotidae =

Family of sponges

Iotrochotidae is a family of sponges belonging to the order Poecilosclerida.

Genera:

- Amphiastrella Dendy, 1896
- Hymetrochota Topsent, 1904
- Iotroata Laubenfels, 1936
- Iotrochopsamma Laubenfels, 1954
- Iotrochota Ridley, 1884
- Rotuloplocamia Lévi, 1952
