= Platytomus darwini =

Scientific classification
- Kingdom: Animalia
- Phylum: Arthropoda
- Clade: Pancrustacea
- Class: Insecta
- Order: Coleoptera
- Suborder: Polyphaga
- Infraorder: Scarabaeiformia
- Family: Scarabaeidae
- Genus: Platytomus
- Species: P. darwini

Binomial name
- Platytomus darwini (Cartwright, 1970)

Synonyms
- Diastictus darwini Cartwright, 1970

Species of beetle

Platytomus darwini is a species of beetle of the family Scarabaeidae. It is found on the Galapagos Islands and Wolf Island.

== Description ==
Adults reach a length of about 3 mm (0.12 in).

== Life history ==
Specimens have been collected in leaf litter under shrubs and succulent plants in littoral and arid areas.
