= Periophthalmus darwini =

Scientific classification
- Domain: Eukaryota
- Kingdom: Animalia
- Phylum: Chordata
- Class: Actinopterygii
- Order: Gobiiformes
- Family: Oxudercidae
- Genus: Periophthalmus
- Species: P. darwini

Binomial name
- Periophthalmus darwini Larson & Takita, 2004

Species of fish

Periophthalmus darwini, Darwin's mudskipper, is a relatively newly discovered mudskipper in 2004, so little is known about it. It is a brackish water ray-finned fish found in Australia along mud banks never far from mangrove trees. It is in the goby family Gobiidae. It is named after Charles Darwin because the holotype was collected in Darwin Harbour. Its greatest distinguishing characteristic from other mudskippers is its greatly reduced first dorsal fin in both sexes.

== Description ==
The Darwin's mudskipper has a body shape and dorsally pultruding eyes similar to other mudskippers. They have a maximum length of 4.6 cm. It has 5–7 dorsal spines, 10–12 dorsal rays, 1 anal spine, and 11–13 anal rays. Its greatest distinguishing characteristic from other mudskippers is its greatly reduced first dorsal fin in both sexes. Its coloration is modally with a background color of light brown. They typically have dark brown streaks on their heads. They usually have dark brown saddles and diagonal and irregular bars.

== Diet ==
The Darwin's mudskipper has been seen eating small invertebrates such as small crabs, but there has not been any published studies^{[2]} on this topic.

== Habitat ==
The Darwin's mudskipper is a brackish to freshwater fish. It is found in the intertidal zone, in tidal creeks, and in inlets along mud banks. They are always near mangrove trees. They often group together. They are considered less aggressive than other mudskippers.

== Reproduction and life cycle ==
There is no published study available on the life cycle or reproduction of the Darwin's mudskipper.

== Distribution ==
Darwin's mudskipper can be found in the Northern Territory and Western Australia.

== Importance to humans ==
The Darwin's mudskipper is harmless to humans^{[1]}. There are other mud skippers in the aquarium trade, but the Darwin's mudskipper is not.

== Etymology ==
The vernacular name and specific name honour Charles Darwin who the type locality, Darwin, Northern Territory was named after.
