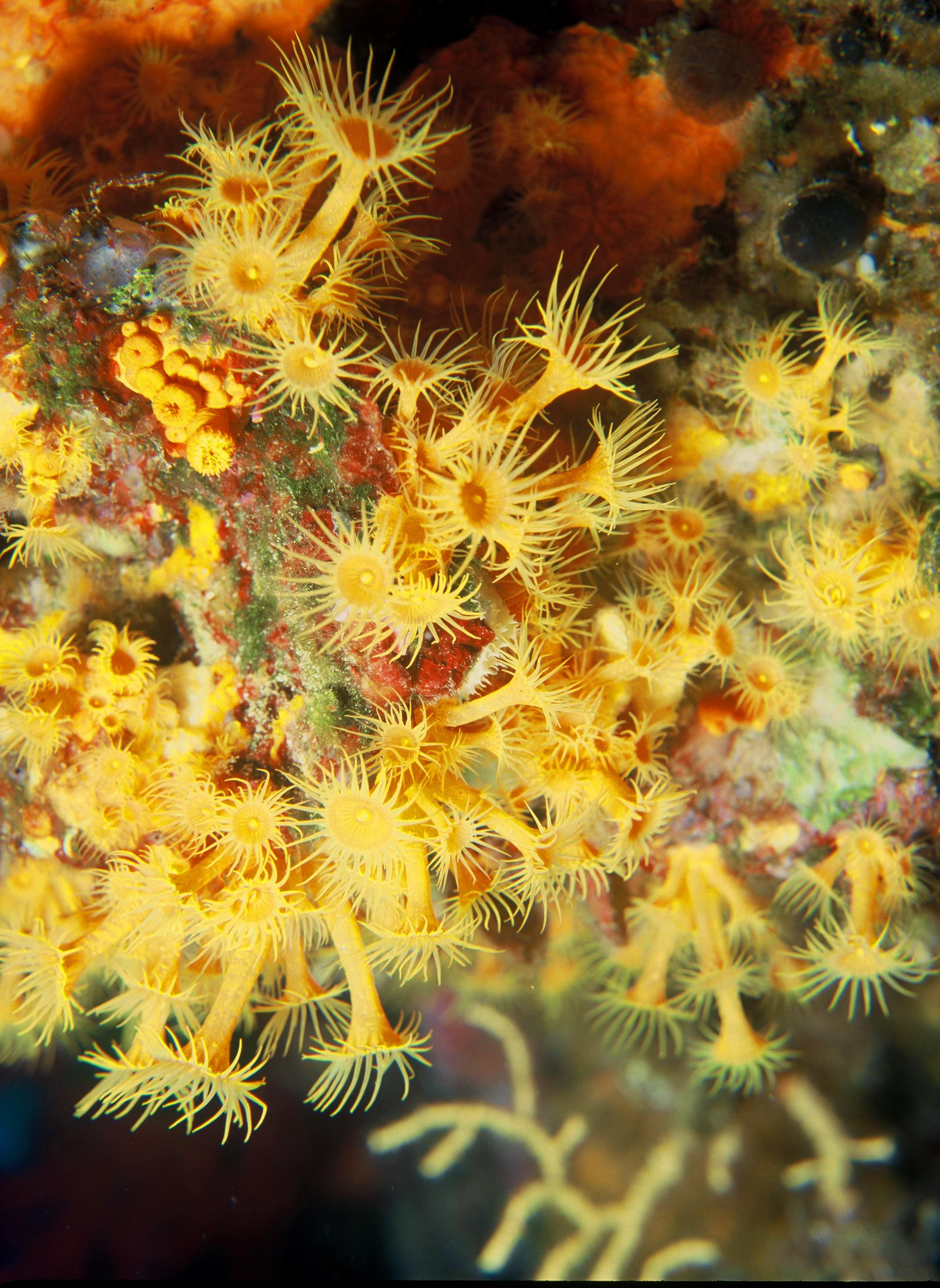
- Parazoanthus axinellae

Scientific classification
- Kingdom: Animalia
- Phylum: Cnidaria
- Subphylum: Anthozoa
- Class: Hexacorallia
- Order: Zoantharia
- Family: Parazoanthidae; Delage & Hérouard, 1901

Synonyms
- Bergiidae Verrill, 1869

= Parazoanthidae =

Family of corals

Parazoanthidae is a family of cnidarians.

Genera include:

- Antipathozoanthus Sinniger, Reimer & Pawlowski, 2010
- Bergia Duchassaing & Michelotti, 1860
- Bullagummizoanthus Sinniger, Ocaña & Baco, 2013
- Churabana gen. nov.
- Corallizoanthus Reimer in Reimer Nonaka Sinniger & Iwase, 2008
- Hurlizoanthus Sinniger, Ocaña & Baco, 2013
- Isozoanthus Carlgren, 1905
- Kauluzoanthus Sinniger, Ocaña & Baco, 2013
- Kulamanamana Sinniger, Ocaña & Baco, 2013
- Mesozoanthus Sinniger & Haussermann, 2009
- Parazoanthus Haddon & Shackleton, 1891
- Savalia Nardo, 1814 (synonym: Gerardia)
- Umimayanthus Montenegro, Sinniger & Reimer, 2015
- Vitrumanthus gen. nov.
- Zibrowius Sinniger, Ocaña & Baco, 2013
