= Gambierdiscus australes =

Scientific classification
- Domain: Eukaryota
- Clade: Sar
- Clade: Alveolata
- Phylum: Dinoflagellata
- Class: Dinophyceae
- Order: Gonyaulacales
- Family: Ostreopsidaceae
- Genus: Gambierdiscus
- Species: G. australes

Binomial name
- Gambierdiscus australes Chinain & Faust 1999

Species of single-celled organism

Gambierdiscus australes is a species of toxic (ciguatoxin- and maitotoxin-like toxicity) dinoflagellate. It is 76–93 μm long and 65–85 μm wide dorsoventrally and its surface is smooth. It is identified by a broad ellipsoid apical pore plate surrounded by 31 round pores. Its first plate occupies 30% of the width of the hypotheca.
