= Gambierdiscus pacificus =

Scientific classification
- Domain: Eukaryota
- Clade: Diaphoretickes
- Clade: SAR
- Clade: Alveolata
- Phylum: Myzozoa
- Superclass: Dinoflagellata
- Class: Dinophyceae
- Order: Gonyaulacales
- Family: Ostreopsidaceae
- Genus: Gambierdiscus
- Species: G. pacificus

Binomial name
- Gambierdiscus pacificus Chinain & Faust, 1999

Species of single-celled organism

Gambierdiscus pacificus is a species of toxic (ciguatoxin- and maitotoxin-like toxicity) dinoflagellate. It is 67–77 μm long and 60–76 μm wide dorsoventrally and its surface is smooth. It is identified by a four-sided apical pore plate surrounded by 30 round pores. Its first plate occupies 20% of the width of the hypotheca.
