= Gambierdiscus polynesiensis =

Scientific classification
- Domain: Eukaryota
- Clade: Sar
- Clade: Alveolata
- Phylum: Dinoflagellata
- Class: Dinophyceae
- Order: Gonyaulacales
- Family: Ostreopsidaceae
- Genus: Gambierdiscus
- Species: G. polynesiensis

Binomial name
- Gambierdiscus polynesiensis Chinain & Faust, 1999

Species of single-celled organism

Gambierdiscus polynesiensis is a species of toxic (ciguatoxin- and maitotoxin-like toxicity) dinoflagellate. It is 68–85 μm long and 64–75 μm wide dorsoventrally and its surface is smooth. It is identified by a large triangular apical pore plate, a narrow fish-hook opening surrounded by 38 round pores, and a large, broad posterior intercalary plate. Its first plate occupies 60% of the width of the hypotheca.
