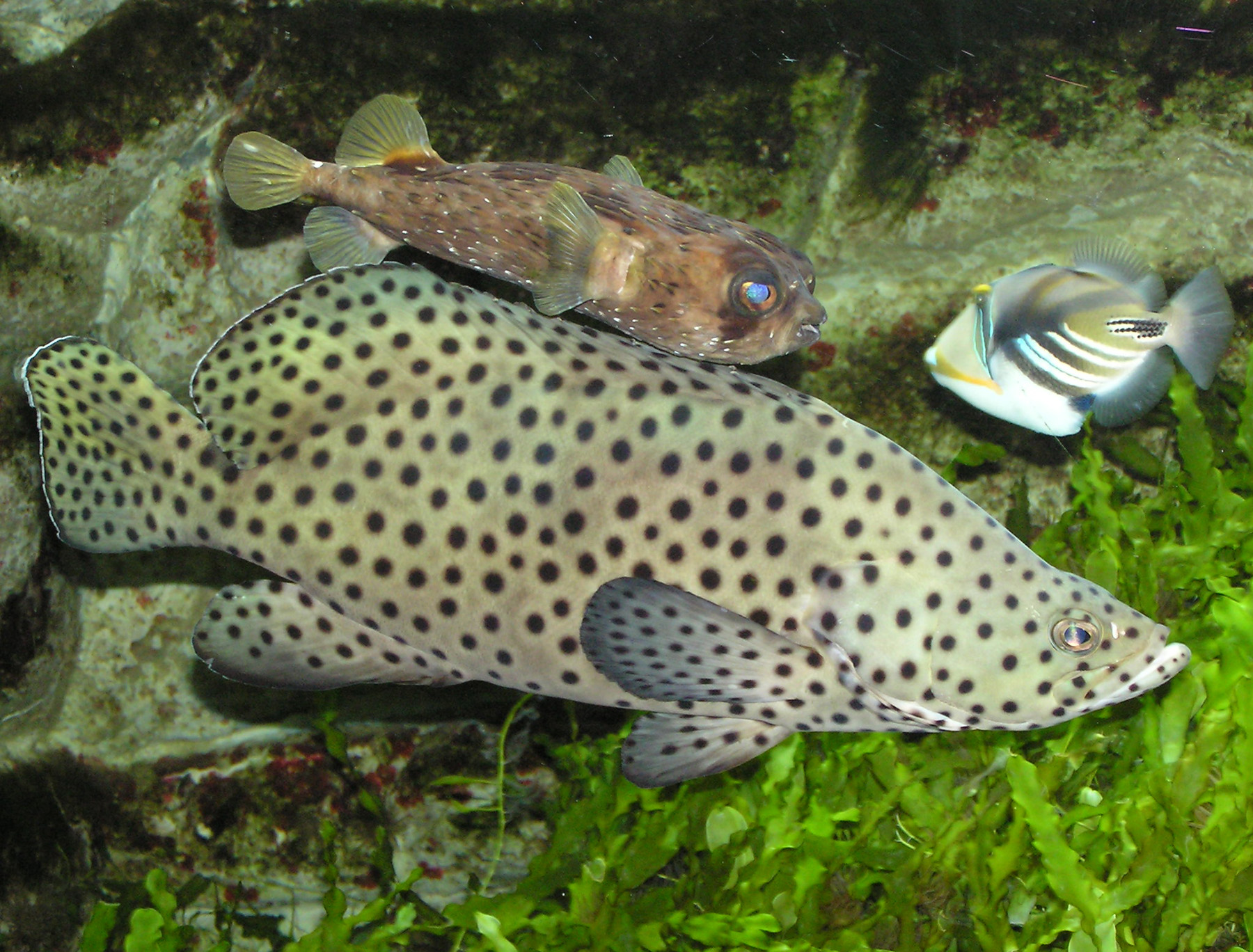
- At the Bristol Zoo

Conservation status
- Data Deficient (IUCN 3.1)

Scientific classification
- Kingdom: Animalia
- Phylum: Chordata
- Class: Actinopterygii
- Division: Teleostei
- Order: Perciformes
- Suborder: Percoidei
- Family: Epinephelidae
- Genus: Chromileptes; Swainson, 1839
- Species: C. altivelis

Binomial name
- Chromileptes altivelis (Valenciennes, 1828)

Synonyms
- List: Genus; Cromileptes Swainson, 1839; Serranichthys Bleeker, 1855 Species; Serranus altivelis Valenciennes, 1828; Epinephelus altivelis (Valenciennes, 1828)

= Humpback grouper =

Species of fish

The humpback grouper (Chromileptes altivelis), also known as the panther grouper, (in Australia) barramundi cod, (in the Philippines, in Tagalog) lapu-lapung senorita, (in the Philippines, in Bisayan) miro-miro, (in France) mérou de Grace Kelly, (in Japan) sarasa-hata, (in India) kalava, and many other local names, is a species of marine ray-finned fish. Specifically, it is a grouper from the subfamily Epinephelinae, which is in the family Serranidae, which also includes the anthias and sea basses. It occurs in the Western Pacific Ocean.

== Systematics ==
The humpback grouper was first formally described as Serranus altivelis in 1828 by the French zoologist Achille Valenciennes (1794–1865) with the type locality given as Java. In 1839, the English naturalist William Swainson (1789–1855) placed it in the subgenus Chromileptes, which was later created as a monotypic genus. Swainson spelt the genus as Chromileptes Recent molecular analyses based on five genes show that Chromileptes altivelis is included in the same clade as species of Epinephelus. Consequently, the species should be included in Epinephelus as Epinephelus altivelis.

=== Genetics ===
Genetic research has revealed the species to have missing genes relating to immunity and the MAPK signal pathway, which may affect the species' disease resistance and growth traits.

Artificial insemination of C. altivelis eggs with giant grouper (E. lanceolatus) sperm created intergeneric hybrids. The hybrids had 1.6x faster growth rate than the humpback grouper, 4.7% increased meat yield, yet was more morphologically similar to E. lanceolatus.

== Distribution and habitat ==
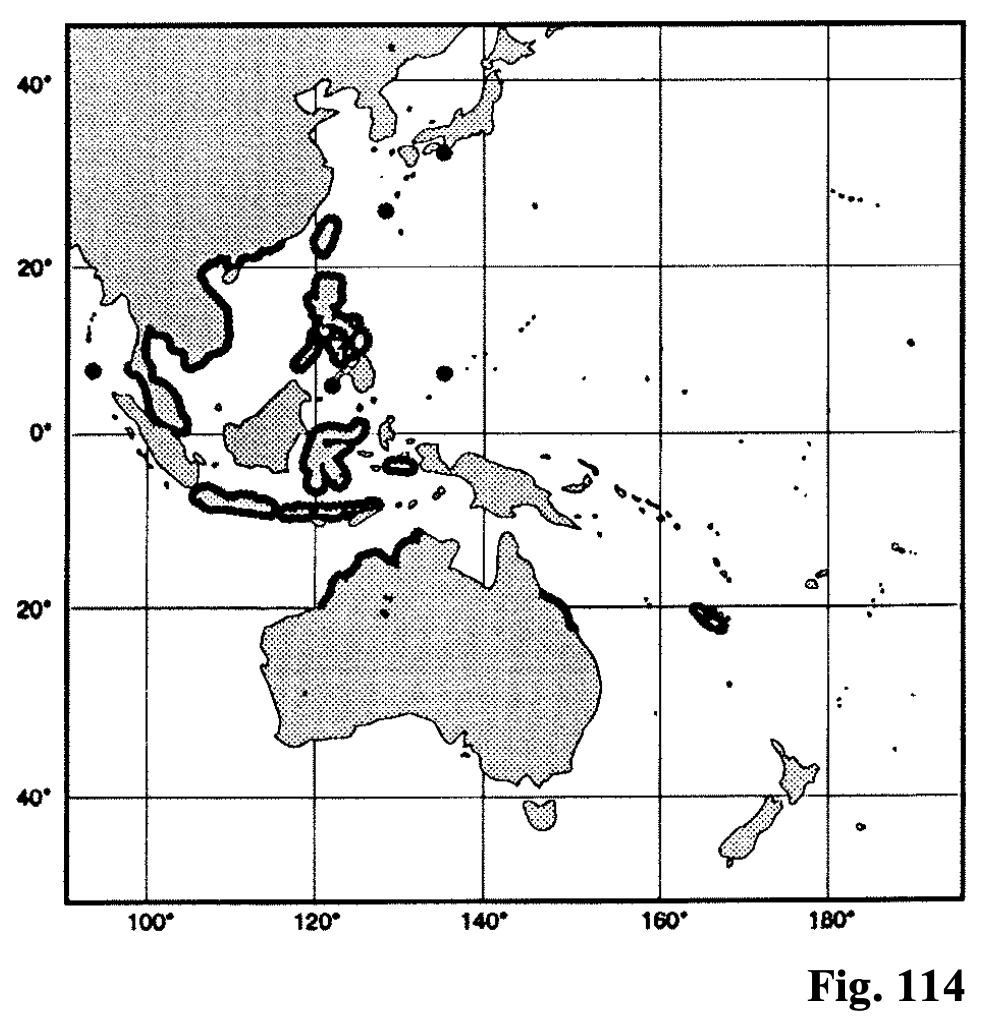
Cromileptes altivelis native distribution

It is widely distributed throughout the tropical waters of the central Indo-West Pacific region. The humpback grouper lives in clear waters from lagoons and seaward reefs with a preference for dead or silty areas. They are found in a range of depth from 2 to 40 m (10 to 130 ft), but usually found at depths less than 10 m (30 ft).

The humpback fish has a preferendum temperature of 24.5 C, similar to other cool, temperate, freshwater fishes.

=== Non-native distribution ===
In Florida, the grouper was first recorded to be observed in 1984, with the last recorded observation in 2012. Throughout Florida, it has been spotted in Tampa Bay, Pompano Beach, and West Beach. In 2012, a single individual was speared near Key Largo, raising fears that it could become invasive, similar to the lionfish. It was a large specimen, with a size of 78 cm (31 in), and weight of 15 lb (6.8 kg). Although there are fears of the humpback grouper becoming invasive in North America, there remains no current breeding populations within the western Atlantic as of 2013. Despite this, researchers have pointed out Florida towns Jupiter and Vero Beach as likely spots for this species to establish.

The humpback grouper has a short history of being introduced in Hawaii, being first observed in 1991. It has since been extirpated, with the last observation in 2005.

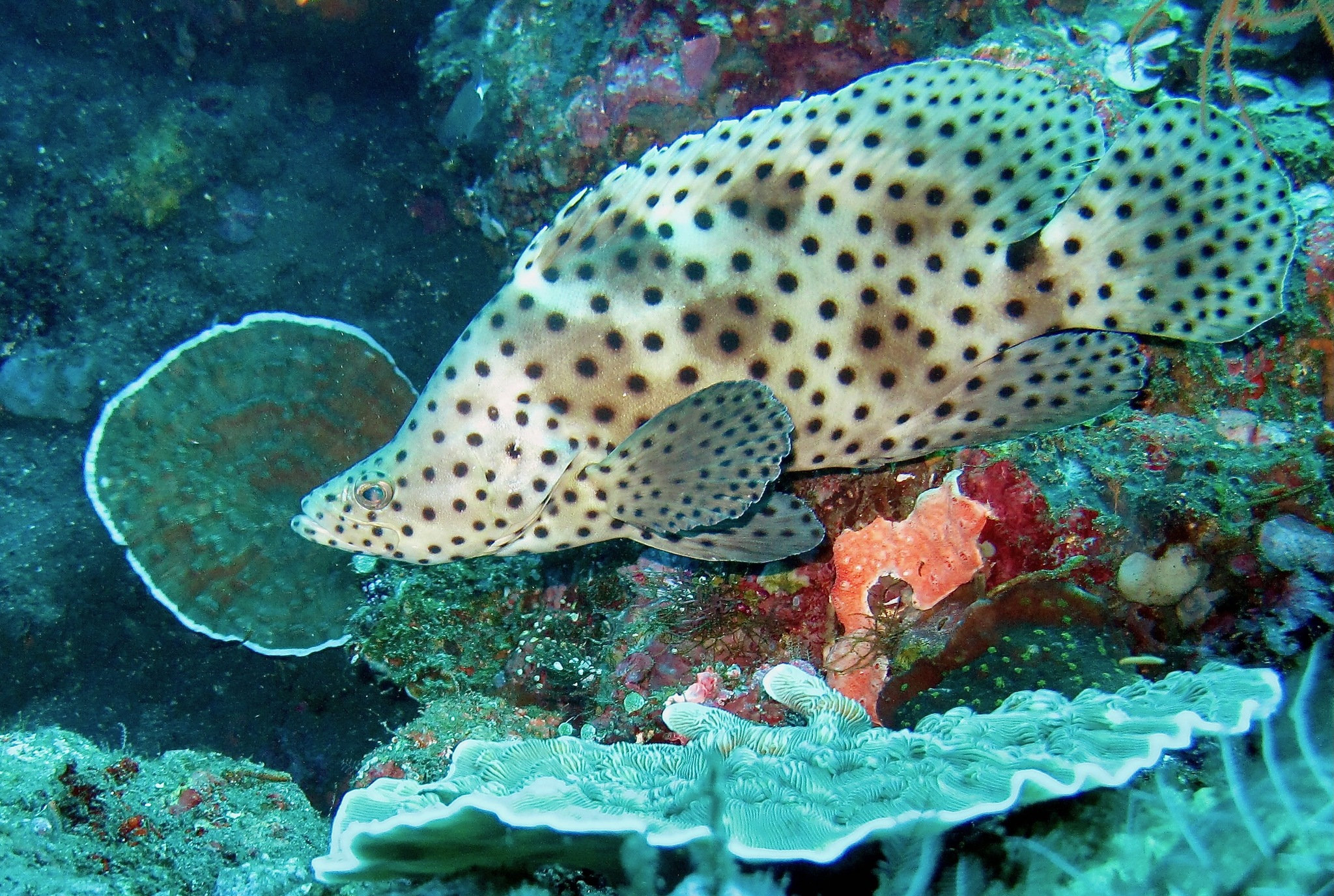
In Indonesia

There has been one recording of the humpback grouper spotted in Kenya.

== Description ==
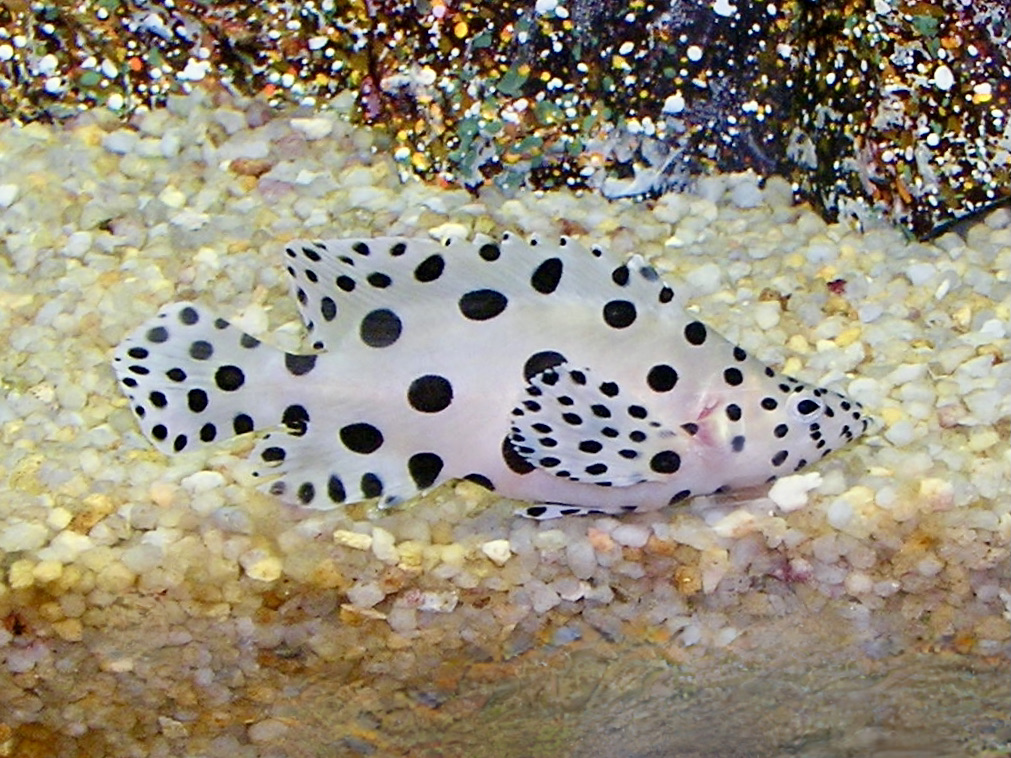
Juvenile

The humpback grouper is a medium-sized fish which grows up to 70 cm (28 in). Its particular body shape makes this grouper difficult to confuse with other fishes. Its body is compressed laterally, is relatively high, and has a unique head profile compared to other groupers. The head is depressed anteriorly and elevated posteriorly, with a sharp rise at the nape. This stocky and strange visual effect gives it the unique humpbacked appearance.

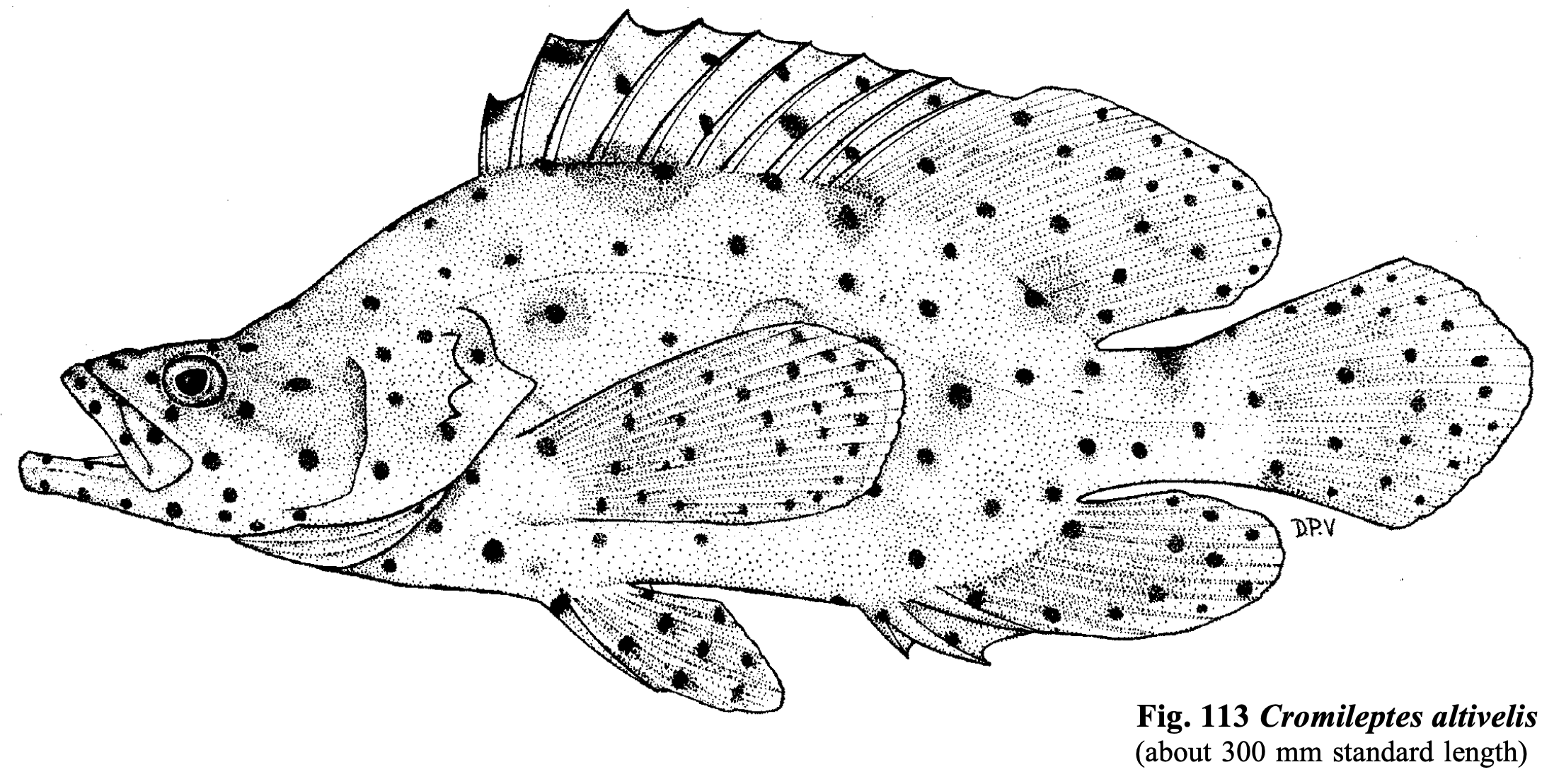
Illustration of a 30 cm SL individual

In addition, there has been genetic evidence of increased activity in this fish's frontal osteoblasts. This may be the genetic basis for the change of C. altivelis' frontal bone to the sunken, 'humpback,' head.

Relating to its coloration, the young are white with round black spots. The adults have a body colouration with variances of grey and beige, with darker blotches variable in size on the body. Small black spots cover the whole body. In comparison, juveniles have fewer of these black spots than adults, but the spots can be larger, or as large, as their eyes. Furthermore, their coloration has been observed to change with a drop in pH.

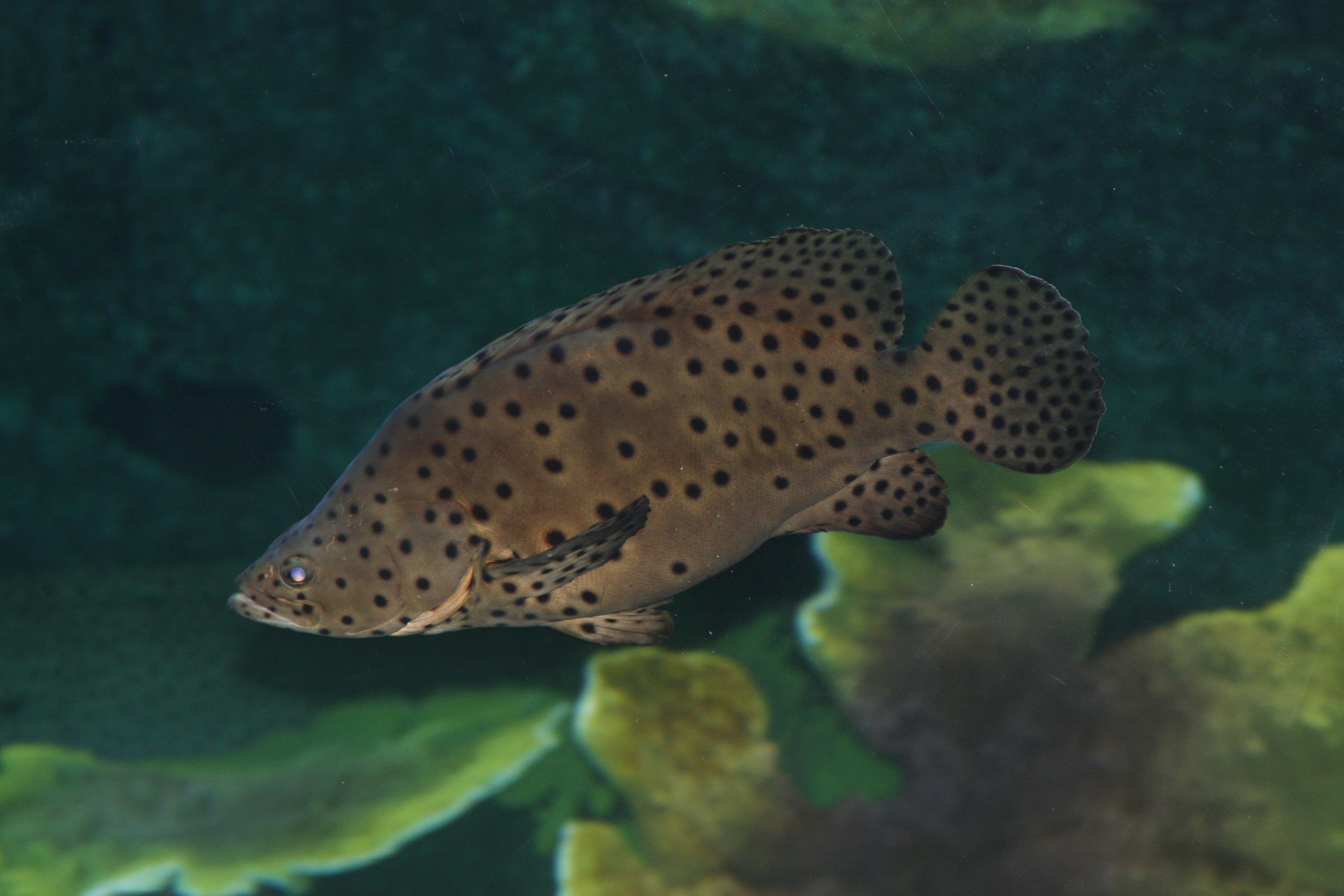
At Siam Center

In terms of its fins, the grouper has rounded pectoral and caudal fins, aiding in stability. Their pectoral fins range between 17 and 18 rays, with the middle rays being the longest. They also have a long dorsal fin that originates from their opercle, and runs all the way to its caudal fin. The dorsal fin consists of around 10 spines and 17–19 rays, which greatly aids in stability against turning. The anal fin, which is about half in length of the dorsal fin, consists of around 3 spines, and 9–10 rays. Their brush-like villiform teeth are adequate for eating smaller fish, and have smooth body scales.

== Biology and ecology ==
=== Life cycle and behaviour ===
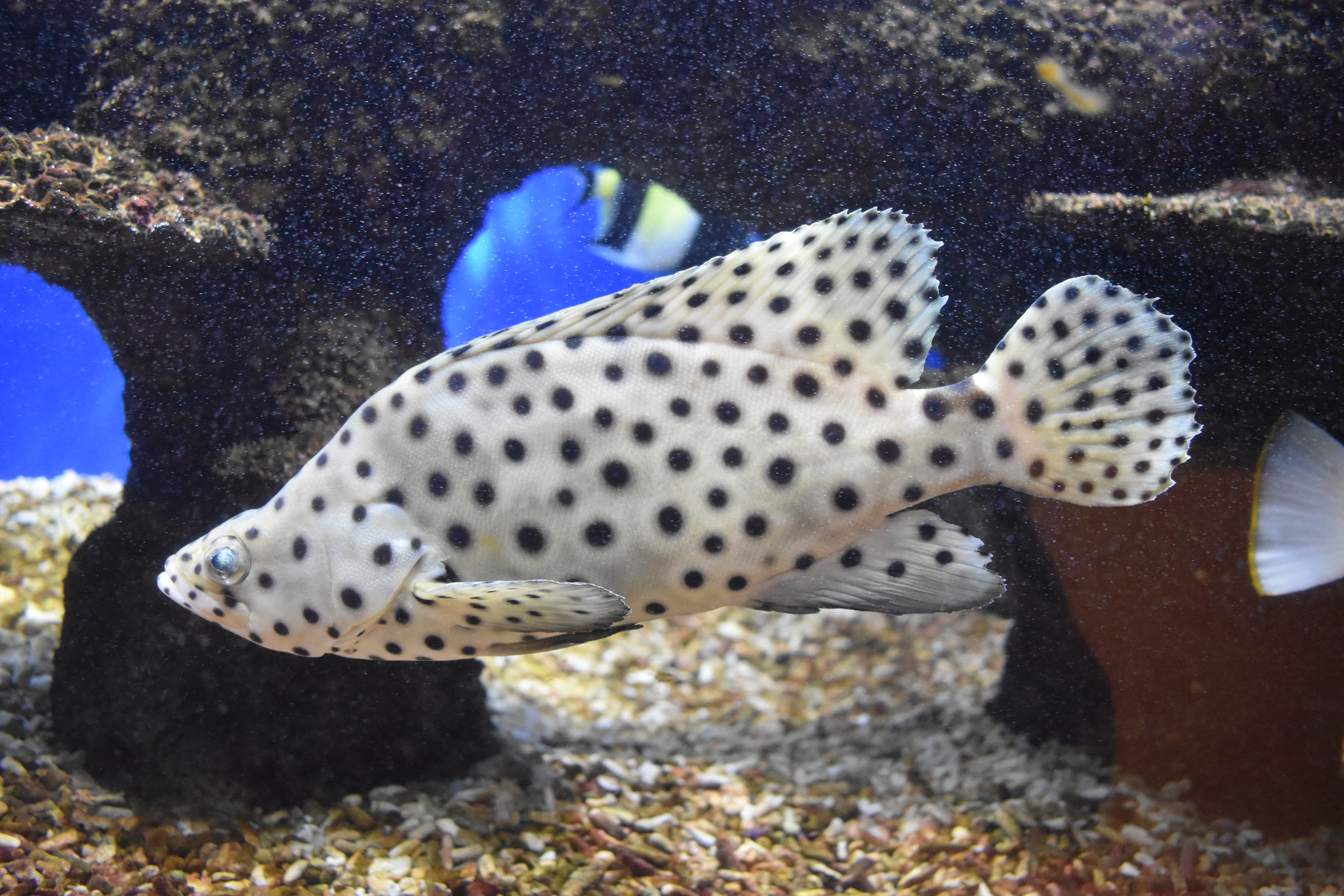
In captivity

This species is a protogynous hermaphrodite; in other words, all individuals are born female, with the ability to transform to males as they grow older. Female humpback groupers start transitioning to males as early as 3 years. By the age of 9, most humpback groupers are male. Typically, only the most dominant, mature females undergo this transformation in the absence of a dominant male.

Although primarily solitary, they are also known to swim in pairs, or sometimes in groups of 3–6. The purpose of these groups is unknown.

Compared to other closely related groupers, the humpback grouper has a slow growth rate, with female humpback groupers maturing around 1.5 years.

Cryopreservation has been tested with these humpback grouper embryos, with the survival rate of 7.55% and maximum time of viability being 5 days.

The humpback grouper's peak spawning time is between October and January, with a single spawn event lasting from 4 to 8 days.

=== Diet ===
The diet of this grouper is based on small fishes and crustaceans, such as krill, shrimp, squids, and clams. In human care, they are commonly fed fresh or dried fish. Like the other members of its family, the humpback grouper is demersal, solitary (except during mating periods), defends a territory, and is an ambush predator. Its feeding activity is maximal at sunrise and/or at sunset.

Because of their carnivorous diet, C. altivelis has been commonly blamed for Ciguatera poisoning throughout their native and non-nonnative distribution.

=== Disease ===
With live fish markets potentially acting as a transmitter of disease, this species has been commonly blamed for ciguatera fish poisoning cases. Ciguatera fish poisoning comes from consuming a fish with ciguatoxins, and the humpback grouper, amongst many other predatory fish, can easily accumulate ciguatoxins. Because of this, ciguatera 'hotspots' surrounding these markets have been a concern for human health.

The humpback grouper is also known to be able to carry many pathogens, including Hirudinea, Pasteurella, grouper iridoviruses, and more. Iridovirus is a leading cause of mortality in groupers kept in captivity, which causes lethargic swimming, darker body coloration, anemia, and more.

== Conservation ==
The humpback grouper has been given the Data Deficient status by the IUCN. It is a highly valued food fish, especially in Southeast Asia where it is also overexploited. It is bred in aquaculture, but there is no evidence that captive breeding has reduced the fishing pressure on wild populations. Despite this, it is suspected that the population has declined historically.

Australia has put strong conservation measures in place for this species (no take species on the Great Barrier Reef and strict possession limits elsewhere, e.g. Western Australia). Size limits apply in commercial fisheries such as the Torres Strait reef line fishery. However, it is lacking protection elsewhere.

Other potentially effective management techniques to preserve the humpback grouper would be implementing size limits, no-take areas, and increasing effort control.

== Aquaculture ==
Although the mariculture of this species has been regarded to be in a primitive stage, the humpback grouper remains to be a popular fish in US aquariums, live fish markets throughout Asia, and aquaculture production mainly in Taiwan and Indonesia.

=== Live fish markets ===
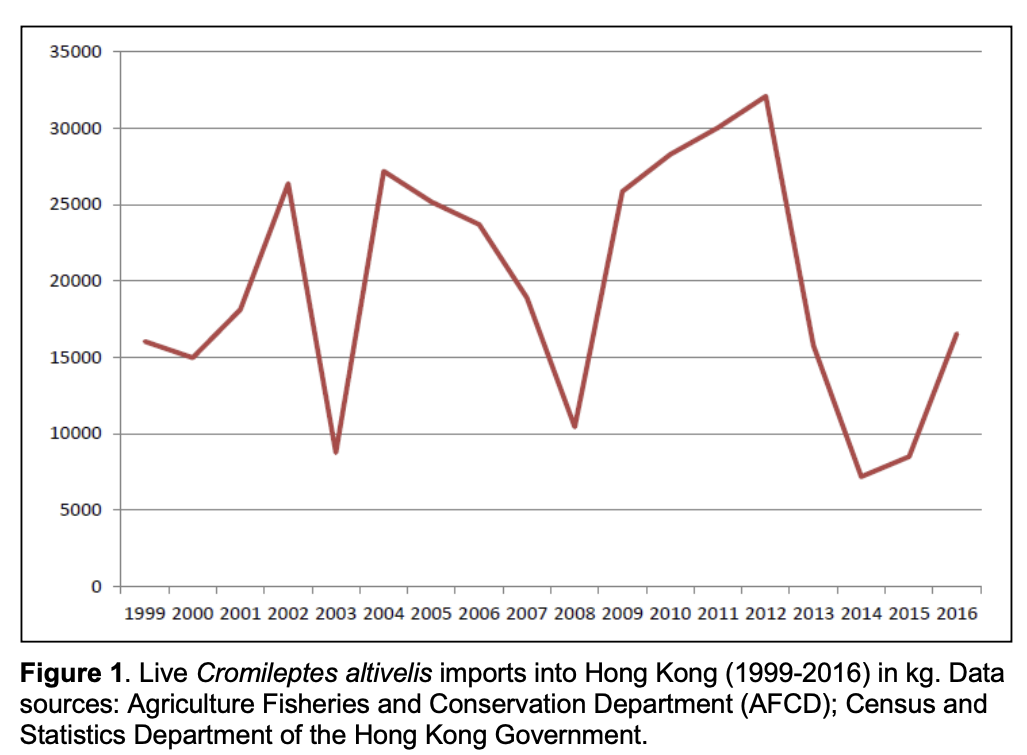
C. altivelis imports into Hong Kong (1999–2016)

The humpback grouper is a popular fish amongst live fish markets, mainly throughout Asia, but more so in Hong Kong. Within the Hong Kong live fish markets, groupers made the majority of the sales in the 1990s.

Hatchery-produced groupers are susceptible to having poorly functioning swim bladders, causing juveniles to circle on the surface until death, with the mortality rate ranging from 20 to 30% from this condition.

=== Rearing ===
When collecting eggs from this species for aquaculture, buoyant eggs are selected, and are usually 0.80–0.83 mm in diameter. From the wild, juveniles are often chosen. For growth and raising, they are usually grown in coastal net cages in Southeast Asia. However, it has been found that floating net cages are poor for growth and health of the fish, yet optimal for production.

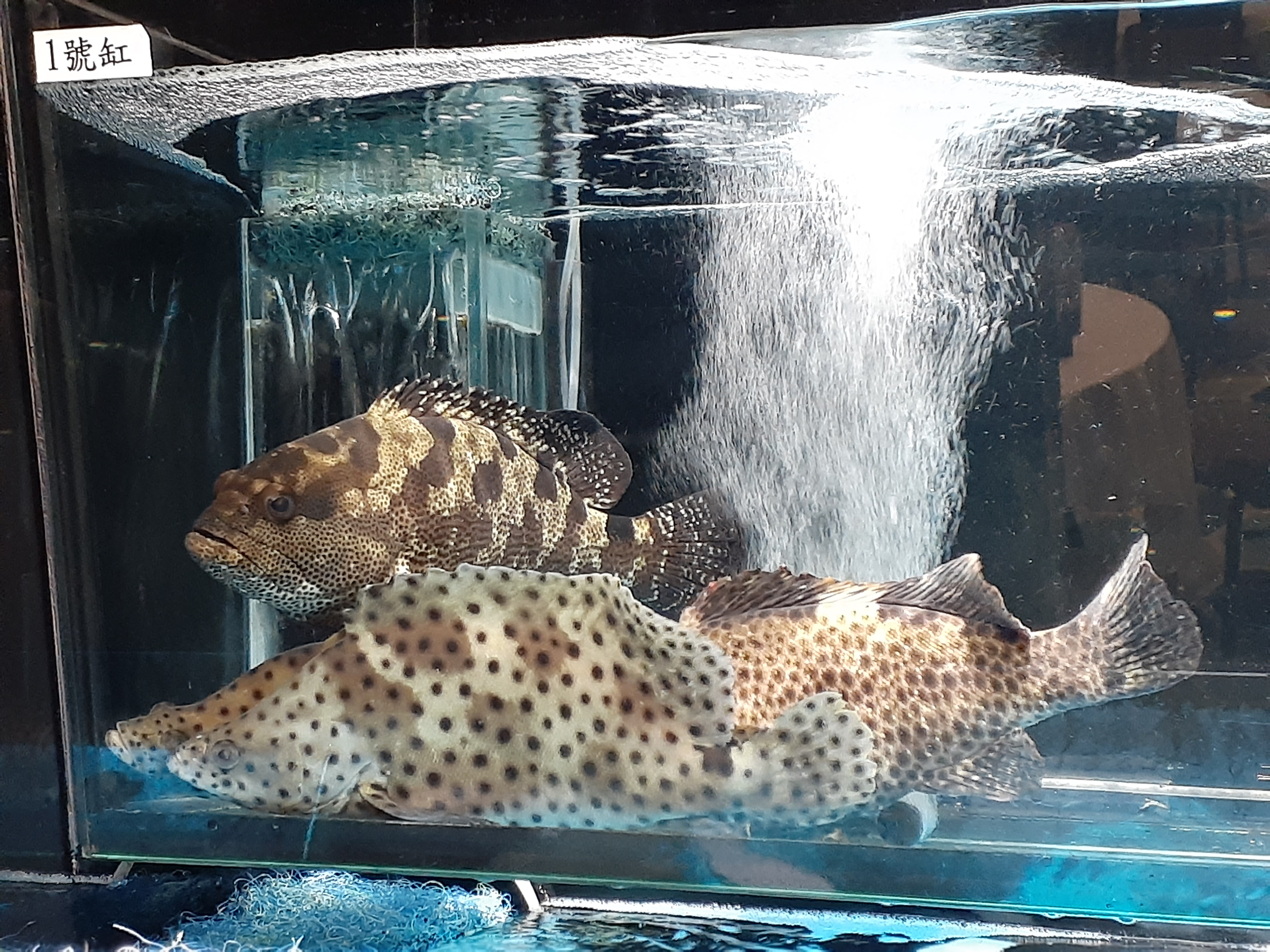
Humpback groupers in aquaria

Newly hatched humpback groupers are sensitive, and, because of this, handling during this period is taken with care. Larvae are stocked into dark culture tanks before hatching to reduce 'shock syndrome', which is a cause of mortality due to dramatic physical changes like water disturbances, or bright light. The culture tanks are also usually stocked with microalgae (such as Nannochoropsis oculata or Tetraselmis sp.) which functions as shade, but also provides food and nutrition. Cannibalism is also a major cause of mortality during later stages, which could be reduced by handling fish into similarly sized tanks, but handling could induce shock syndrome.

In terms of feeding, there remains low interest to develop specialized food diets for the small humpback grouper market. Because of this, humpback groupers are often fed 'trash fish,' which are low-value, bycatch fish species. However, feeding juveniles with copepod nauplii has shown some promise to increase growth rates.

=== Socioeconomic effects ===
Grouper aquaculture has remained popular throughout Southeast Asia because of the accessibility of materials. In Bali, 'backyard' hatcheries contributed to economic development, with an increased profit compared to more traditional local agricultural paths such as coconut plantations. In the Philippines, grouper aquaculture is profitable due to less capital investment compared to the common milkfish aquaculture.

Despite this, production is likely to remain low. Because of the slow growing humpback groupers, farmers are likely to mainly focus on faster growth fish.
