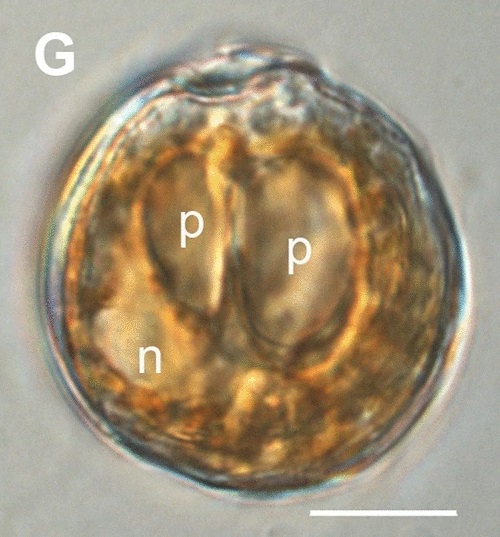
- Light microscope image of C. malayensis (strain C6C1)

Scientific classification
- Domain: Eukaryota
- Supergroup: Alveolata
- Division: Dinoflagellata
- Class: Dinophyceae
- Order: Gonyaulacales
- Family: Ostreopsidaceae
- Genus: Coolia; Meunier

= Coolia =

Genus of dinoflagellates of the family Ostreopsidaceae

Coolia is a marine dinoflagellate genus in the family Ostreopsidaceae. It was first described by Meunier in 1919. There are currently seven identified species distributed globally in tropical and temperate coastal waters. Coolia is a benthic or epiphytic type dinoflagellate: it can be found adhered to sediment or other organisms but it is not limited to these substrates. It can also be found in a freely motile form in the water column. The life cycle of Coolia involves an asexual stage where the cell divides by binary fission and a sexual stage where cysts are produced. Some of the species, for example, Coolia tropicalis and Coolia malayensis, produce toxins that can potentially cause shellfish poisoning in humans.

== Etymology ==
The genus was named after a Pharmacist, M. Cool, from Nieupoort, Belgium, where the first species of the genus Coolia, Coolia monotis was originally discovered in the oyster beds.

== Taxonomy ==
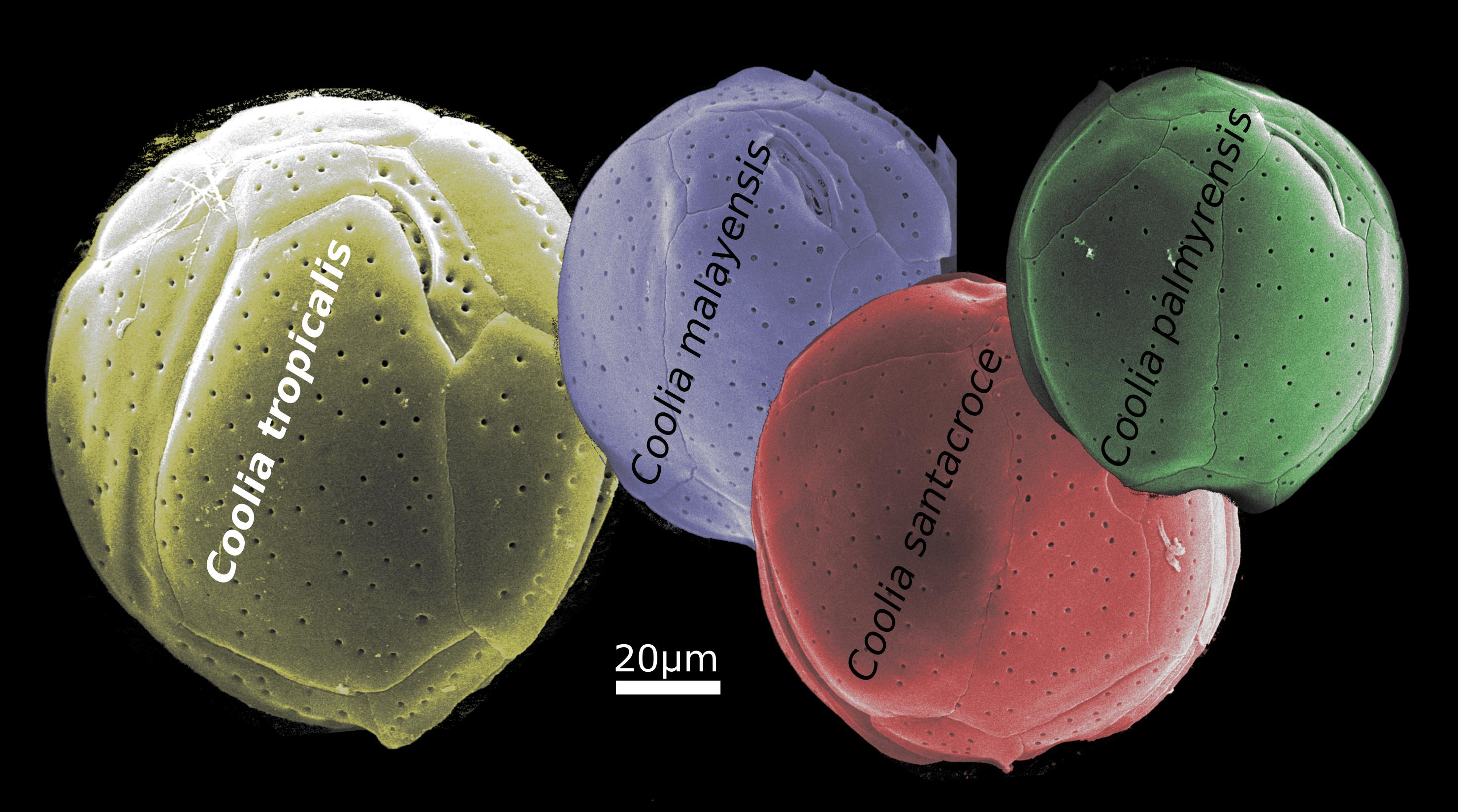
Colorized scanning electron micrographs: Cells of four Coolia species in comparison.

Coolia was first described by Alphonse Meunier (1919). At the time of discovery, it was placed in its own monospecific genus. At that time, the only species identified was Coolia monotis, which was discovered in oyster beds and the waters surrounding Nieupoort, Belgium.

Between 1928 and 1956, Coolia monotis was placed in the same genus as Ostreopsis species, which is a genus also in the family Ostreopidaceae, because Coolia and Ostreopsis have similar patterns on their epithecae. In 1956 however, because of distinct differences in the hypotheca, it was put back into its individual genera in the family Ostreopidaceae.

Coolia monotis remained the only species in the Coolia until 1995. In 1995, Coolia tropicalis was described. In 2000, Coolia areolata was described. In 2008, Coolia canariensis was described. In 2010, Coolia malayensis was described. Most recently in 2015, Coolia santacroce and Coolia palmyrensis were described.

Species include:

- Coolia areolata
- Coolia canariensis
- Coolia malayensis
- Coolia monotis
- Coolia tropicalis
- Coolia santacroce
- Coolia palmyrensis

== Description ==
=== Morphology ===
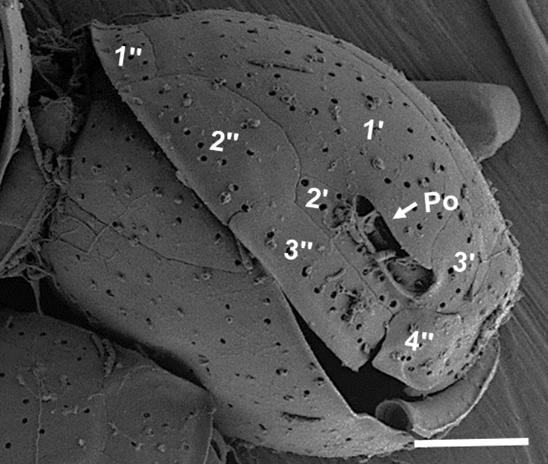
Apical pore, adjacent plates and some taxonomically important plates of C. malayensis in scanning electron microscopy

Coolia has small spherical cells and is anteroposteriorly compressed. The cell size varies based on the species, but they have been typically reported to be approximately between 23-50 μm in length and 21-45 μm wide. Coolia cells are distinguished by having a round hypotheca that is larger than their round epitheca.

Coolia has plates covering the thecal surface that have an irregular pattern and are various sizes. In most species, the thecal surface contains intercalary bands and is smooth and covered with large thecal pores that are round and ovoid. Another distinguishing feature to identify Coolia is a plate on the epitheca that is off centred and contains an apical pore complex with a long, curved pore that has a slit containing two costae. This apical pore is often visible because of its large size. Coolia also has an ellipsoidal-shaped ventral pore on the ventral surface.

From a dorsal view of the cell, the lipped cingulum (located equatorially) can be viewed. The cingulum is narrow and the inside surface has round pores with smooth edges. There are also marginal pores surrounding the lipped cingulum. Coolia also has a narrow sulcus that contains relatively short longitudinal flagellum at the posterior end. As Coolia is photosynthetic, it contains golden-brown discoid chloroplasts. The cells also only contain one nucleus with condensed chromosomes in the hypocone.

=== Life cycle ===
Coolia has an asexual and a sexual life cycle. It is thought that under low nutrients, low light, or low temperature conditions, sexual reproduction may be initiated, resulting in the production of a resting cyst.

Cells divide asexually by binary fission. The division process begins as the single nucleus with condensed chromosomes elongates and two nuclei develop parallel to each other. Before dividing into daughter cells, the dividing cells stay attached to each other for approximately 12-24 hours. The doubling time of Coolia is approximately 3-4 days

Sexual reproduction occurs as gametes begin to form in the population; this is an irreversible transition. Gametes move around each other rapidly and then align laterally, forming gamete pairs with the girdle and sulcus contacting each other, forming a fertilization bridge. A planozygote is formed when the cells stop moving and the fertilization bridge disappears, allowing the two nuclei to join together. This indicates that karyogamy has occurred. The theca then begins to develop and the cell becomes motile. As the planozygote matures, it shrinks and becomes immobile, eventually developing into a cyst. The cyst further develops to contain a single nucleus that makes up much of the volume of the cell. At the end of the process, meiosis occurs. The sexual life cycle is thought to last approximately 2 months.

=== Genetics ===
Phylogenetic analysis of different regions of rDNA supports the separate genus' for Ostreopsis and Coolia. Analysis of 5.8S rDNA-ITS sequence alignments from European and Asian isolates and their out-groups supports distinct lineages of Ostreopsis and Coolia. Lineages of Ostreopsis from Europe and Asia are genetically isolated and separate from lineages of Coolia from Europe and Asia. This indicates that the lineages of Ostreopsis and Coolia evolved independently. Additionally, analysis of LSU rDNA data shows that all the species of Coolia share a more recent common ancestor with each other than they do with Ostreopsis, who share a more recent common ancestor with other species in its genus.

== Habitat and ecology ==
Coolia is found globally in coastal marine regions of both temperate and tropical waters. Coolia monotis have a large habitat range and is found in tropical, sub-tropical, and temperate regions, whereas other species such as Coolia areolata and Coolia tropicalis have a more restricted range and are typically found in tropical regions.

Coolia is typically a benthic type organism and can be attached to sandy substrates, coral, or brown and red seaweed. In addition, it also can act as a planktonic organism and form blooms in the water column.

Coolia, especially in tropical regions, forms assemblages with Gambierdiscus toxicus; thus, they are often falsely described as being responsible for causing ciguatera. Ciguatera is actually caused by Gambierdiscus toxicus, not Coolia.

== Human importance ==
Coolia is considered a toxic dinoflagellate genus. Some of the species are known to be toxic and produce harmful algal blooms (HABs) that are of potential concern to human health. They produce yessotoxins. The species that are known to produce the toxins are Coolia tropicalis, Coolia malayensis, Coolia santacroce and Coolia palmyrensis. However, it is possible other species of the genus also produce toxins.
