= Ciguatoxin 1 =

Toxic compound found in some fish

ciguatoxin 1

Identifiers
- IUPAC name: (2R,2'R,3a'S,4S,4a'R,5'S,6'S,9'S,10'S,10a'R,11a'S,12a'R,13a'S,14a'R,15a'S,17'Z,19a'R,20a'S,22a'R,23a'S,24'R,24a'R,26'R,29a'S,30a'R,31a'S,32a'R,34a'S,35a'R,37'R,37a'S,38a'R)-26'-[(1E,3S)-3,4-Dihydroxy- 1-buten-1-yl]-2',5',9',10',37a'-pentamethyl-1',3',3a',4,4a',5,5',6',6a',9',10',10a',11a',12',12a',13a',14',14a',15a',16',19',19a',20a',22a',23a',24',24a',26',29',29a',30a',31',31a',32a',34a',35a',36', 37',37a',38a'-tetracontahydro-2'H,3H-spiro(furan-2(3H),2'(3'H)-oxepino(2',3':5,6)pyrano(2,3:5,6)pyrano(2,3:6',7')oxepino(2',3':6,7)oxepino(3,2-b)pyrano(2,3:6',7')oxepino(2',3':5,6)pyrano(2,3:7,8)oxocino(2,3:5',6')pyrano(2',3':6,7)oxepino(2,3-h)oxonin
- CAS Number: 11050-21-8
- PubChem CID: 5311333
- ChemSpider: 4470834
- UNII: 2UKQ3B7696
- KEGG: C16762
- ChEBI: CHEBI:36467
- CompTox Dashboard (EPA): DTXSID3042637 DTXSID40880000, DTXSID3042637

Chemical and physical data
- Formula: C_{60}H_{86}O_{19}
- Molar mass: 1111.329 g·mol^{−1}
- 3D model (JSmol): Interactive image
- SMILES: C[C@@H]1C[C@H]2[C@@H](C[C@H]3[C@H](O2)[C@H]([C@@H]([C@H]4[C@H](O3)[C@H]([C@@H]([C@]5(O4)C[C@@H](CO5)O)C)C)O)C)O[C@H]6C[C@@H]7[C@]([C@@H](C[C@@H]8[C@@H](O7)C/C=C\C[C@@H]9[C@@H](O8)C=C[C@@H]2[C@@H](O9)C=C[C@@H]3[C@@H](O2)C[C@@H]2[C@@H](O3)[C@@H]([C@@H]3[C@@H](O2)CC=C[C@@H](O3)/C=C/[C@@H](CO)O)O)O)(O[C@@H]6C1)C
- InChI: InChI=1S/C60H86O19/c1-28-19-42-44(22-48-54(76-42)30(3)52(65)58-55(77-48)29(2)31(4)60(79-58)25-33(63)27-67-60)73-46-24-51-59(5,78-47(46)20-28)50(64)23-45-36(74-51)11-7-6-10-35-37(71-45)15-16-39-38(69-35)17-18-40-43(70-39)21-49-57(75-40)53(66)56-41(72-49)12-8-9-34(68-56)14-13-32(62)26-61/h6-9,13-18,28-58,61-66H,10-12,19-27H2,1-5H3/b7-6-,14-13+/t28-,29+,30+,31+,32+,33+,34-,35-,36+,37+,38+,39-,40-,41+,42+,43+,44-,45-,46+,47-,48+,49-,50-,51-,52+,53-,54-,55-,56+,57-,58+,59+,60-/m1/s1; Key:VYVRIXWNTVOIRD-LRHBOZQDSA-N

Ciguatoxin 1 or CTX-1 is a toxic chemical compound, the most common and potent type in the group of ciguatoxins. It is a large molecule consisting of polycyclic ethers that can be found in certain types of fish in the Pacific Ocean. The compound is produced by Dinoflagellates Gambierdiscus toxicus and is passed on through the food chain by fish. The compound has no effect in fish but is toxic to humans and rodents.

== History ==
Before ciguatoxin was discovered and identified, its presence in the food chain was hypothesised by Randall et al, who assumed that the toxin enters the food chain via herbivorous fish that feed on toxic microalgae and then gets passed on to humans directly or by passing through other carnivorous fish. This hypothesis was proven by Helfrich and Banner, who also showed that the toxin has no effect on fish, both herbivorous and carnivorous.

Ciguatoxin-1 was first discovered in 1967 by Scheuer et al when studying ciguatera fish responsible for food poisoning. Later on, in 1977 Yasumoto et al isolated the compound from Dinoflagellates and named it ciguatoxin, after which it was classified as a polyether compound. In the 1980s and early 1990s the full structure of ciguatoxin-1 was elucidated using NMR- spectroscopy, mass-spectrometry and X-ray crystallography. Due to the high complexity of its structure, ciguatoxin-1 has not been assigned an official IUPAC name and is denoted simply as ciguatoxin-1 or CTX-1.

As such the compound hasn't been found of any practical use in daily life. However, it has been shown useful for the studies of voltage gated sodium channels, where it can be used as a tool to alter the channel permeability and polarisability.

== Ecosystem distribution ==
CTX-1 is produced by dinoflagellates called Gambierdiscus toxicus. These dinoflagellates are either free flowing in the water or associated to different types of microalgae. The toxin from the Gambierdiscus Toxicus accumulates in the fish that consume these organisms, and through the food chain the toxin eventually enters the human body. CTX-1 cannot fully be removed from the fish by cooking it. The toxin is found in tropical and subtropical coral reef fishes. Typically, these fishes are large predator fishes like moray eels, barracudas, snappers, Spanish Mackerels and groupers.

There have been studies suggesting the transmission of the toxin from a pregnant mother to the foetus, and from a nursing mother to her child. There have also been some reports about sexual partners of ciguatoxin poisoning patients also experiencing symptoms.

== Food poisoning symptoms ==
Eating fish containing a high enough dose of CTX-1 causes Ciguatera Food Poisoning (CFP). It is suspected that concentration of 0.08 ug/kg fish is high enough to cause clinical symptoms and concentrations over 0.1 ug/kg fish are considered a health risk. There are different types of symptoms for CFP: gastrointestinal, cardiac, neurological and neuropsychological symptoms. Gastrointestinal symptoms include nausea, vomiting, abdominal pain and diarrhoea. These symptoms usually start to show within 6-12h of fish consumption and resolve spontaneously within 1-4 days. Cardiac symptoms include hypotension and bradycardia. These signs can lead to necessity of emergency medical care. The neurological and neuropsychological symptoms usually become prominent after the gastrointestinal symptoms appear and they usually become present within two days of the illness. The signs and symptoms include weakness, toothache, the sensation of loose teeth, paraesthesia, dysesthesia, itching, confusion, reduced memory, difficulty concentrating, sweating and blurred vision. A characteristic symptom is cold allodynia, sometime referred to as ‘hot-cold reversal’, which is characterised by an abnormal sensation when touching cold water or objects.

== Mechanism of action ==
One of the most prominent studies on the effects of P-CTX-1 on the neural tissue by Benoit et al in 1994 revealed that ciguatoxin-1 can induce spontaneous action potentials in frog myelinated neural fibres, that were eliminated by the addition of TTX. This allowed researchers to conclude that P-CTX-1 mechanism of action must involve voltage-dependent (Nav) sodium channels. Later in 2005, a similar study by Birinyi-Strachan et al confirmed this hypothesis by analysing the effects of P-CTX-1 on the excitability of rat dorsal root ganglion. This study has shown that ciguatoxin-1 can prolong the action potential and increase the afterhyperpolarisation of the cells.

It has also been shown that P-CTX-1 acts differently on TTX-sensitive and TTX-resistant cells: in the former, it causes leakage current and reduction in peak signal amplitude, while in the latter it causes the reduction of peak amplitude and increased recovery rate from inactivation. These findings show that different action mechanisms of P-CTX-1may contribute to the big variety neurological symptoms as each type of neural tissue reacts to ciguatoxin in a different manner.

Further studies were carried out to identify the mechanism of action of P-CTX-1 on Nav channels, which assumed a direct interaction between the toxin and the sodium channels. However, in 1992 Lewis disproved the original hypothesis and showed that the interaction is indirect, by the means of beta1-adrenoceptor stimulation.

In their study Birinyi-Strachan et al have also shown that P-CTX-1 can also block delayed rectifier voltage gated potassium channels in rat neurons, which could generally contribute to the overall membrane depolarisation, prolonged action potentials, increased afterhyperpolarisation, and lowered threshold for action potential firing. These findings could further explain the origin of various symptoms of ciguatera such as paraesthesia or dysesthesia.

It was also found that CTX-1 releases noradrenaline and ATP by asynchronous discharge of preganglionic perivascular axons. CTX-1 prolongs the action potential and afterhyperpolarisation duration. In a subpopulation of neurons, tonic action potential firing can be produced.

Even though ciguatera poisoning causes major gastrointestinal distress, so far P-CTX-1 hasn't been proven to have a direct effect on digestive systems. Terao et al showed that no morphological alterations were observed in the mucosa or muscle layers of the small intestine, despite the severe diarrhoea commonly observed upon P-CTX-1 administration. Other studies (Lewis et al 1984, Lewis, Hoy 1983) have shown that P-CTX-1 causes acetyl choline release from parasympathetic cholinergic nerve terminals, which suggests that nerve stimulation by P-CTX-1 is followed by nerve blockade, likely due to further nerve depolarisation.

== Toxicokinetics ==
As of today, only several studies were carried out on the biodistribution and toxicokinetics of ciguatoxins, most of which were carried out in rats or in vitro.

In a study by Bottein et al in 2011 it was shown that in rats, detectable levels of P-CTX-1 were observed in liver, muscle and brain up to 96 hours after intraperitoneal and oral administration. The terminal half-lives were reported at 112 h and 82 h respectively. The main excretion route was shown to be faecal, with P-CTX-1 or its other polar metabolites being present in faeces for up to 4 days after administration.

Another article speculated that ciguatoxins might be biotransformed in vitro by the means of glucuronidation. However, it was shown that glucuronidation was not observed for any of the ciguatoxins used in the study (including P-CTX-1) by both rat and human, which could suggest the prevalence of other conjugation pathways in mammals
