= Gambierdiscus carolinianus =

Scientific classification
- Domain: Eukaryota
- Clade: Diaphoretickes
- Clade: SAR
- Clade: Alveolata
- Phylum: Myzozoa
- Superclass: Dinoflagellata
- Class: Dinophyceae
- Order: Gonyaulacales
- Family: Ostreopsidaceae
- Genus: Gambierdiscus
- Species: G. carolinianus

Binomial name
- Gambierdiscus carolinianus Litaker, Vandersea, M.A.Faust, Kibler, W.C.Holland & P.A.Tester, 2009

Species of single-celled organism

Gambierdiscus carolinianus is a species of toxic dinoflagellate, which among others causes ciguatera fish poisoning. It is photosynthetic and epibenthic.
