= Gambierdiscus ruetzleri =

Scientific classification
- Domain: Eukaryota
- Clade: Sar
- Clade: Alveolata
- Phylum: Dinoflagellata
- Class: Dinophyceae
- Order: Gonyaulacales
- Family: Ostreopsidaceae
- Genus: Gambierdiscus
- Species: G. ruetzleri

Binomial name
- Gambierdiscus ruetzleri Faust, Litaker, Vandersea, Kibler, Holland & Tester, 2009

Species of single-celled organism

Gambierdiscus ruetzleri is a species of toxic dinoflagellates, which among others causes ciguatera fish poisoning. It is photosynthetic and epibenthic.
