= Gambierol =

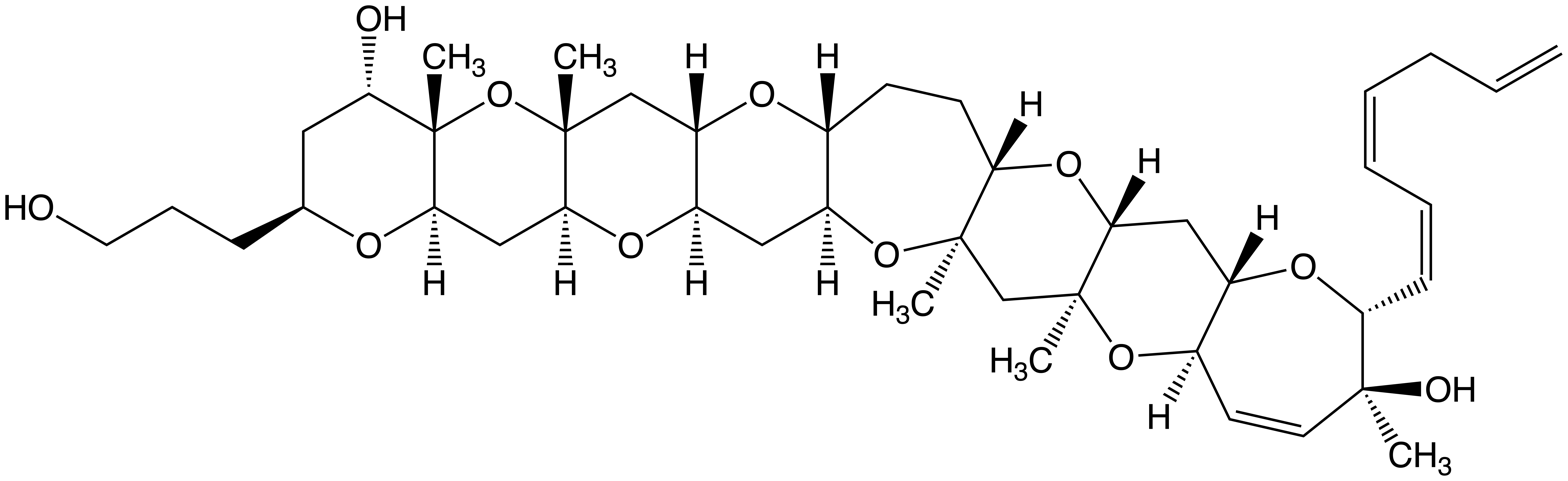

Names
- Preferred IUPAC name (2S,4S,4aS,5aR,6aS,7aR,9aS,10aR,11aS,13R,14S,16aR,17aS,18aR,19aS,20aR,21aS,22aR)-13-[(1Z,3Z)-Hepta-1,3,6-trien-1-yl]-2-(3-hydroxypropyl)-4a,5a,14,17a,18a-pentamethyl-2,3,4,4a,5a,6,6a,7a,8,9,9a,10a,11,11a,13,14,16a,17a,18,18a,19a,20,20a,21a,22,22a-hexacosahydrooxepino[2′′,3′′:5′,6′]pyrano[2′,3′:5,6]pyrano[3,2-b]pyrano[2′′′,3′′′:5′′,6′′]pyrano[2′′,3′′:5′,6′]pyrano[2′,3′:5,6]pyrano[2,3-f]oxepine-4,14-diol

Identifiers
CAS Number	146763-62-4
3D model (JSmol)	Interactive image
ChEMBL	ChEMBL266438
ChemSpider	4946332
PubChem CID	6442244
UNII	844Q8WC5F6
CompTox Dashboard (EPA)	DTXSID30880110
- InChI: InChI=1S/C43H64O11/c1-7-8-9-10-11-14-34-39(2,46)18-17-28-30(49-34)22-36-42(5,52-28)25-41(4)35(51-36)16-15-27-31(53-41)21-29-32(48-27)24-40(3)37(50-29)23-38-43(6,54-40)33(45)20-26(47-38)13-12-19-44/h7,9-11,14,17-18,26-38,44-46H,1,8,12-13,15-16,19-25H2,2-6H3/b10-9-,14-11-/t26-,27+,28+,29+,30-,31-,32-,33-,34+,35-,36+,37-,38+,39-,40+,41+,42-,43-/m0/s1 Key: GKLILONDTZZKRF-IDJCTBPMSA-N
- SMILES: C[C@@]12C[C@H]3[C@@H](C[C@H]4[C@H](O3)CC[C@H]5[C@](O4)(C[C@]6([C@H](O5)C[C@H]7[C@H](O6)C=C[C@]([C@H](O7)/C=C\C=C/CC=C)(C)O)C)C)O[C@H]1C[C@@H]8[C@@](O2)([C@H](C[C@@H](O8)CCCO)O)C

Properties
Chemical formula	C_{43}H_{64}O_{11}
Molar mass	756.974 g·mol^{−1}
- Except where otherwise noted, data are given for materials in their standard state (at 25 °C [77 °F], 100 kPa). Infobox references

Gambierol is a marine polycyclic ether toxin which is produced by the dinoflagellate Gambierdiscus toxicus. Gambierol is collected from the sea at the Rangiroa Peninsula in French Polynesia. The toxins are accumulated in fish through the food chain and can therefore cause human intoxication. The symptoms of the toxicity resemble those of ciguatoxins, which are extremely potent neurotoxins that bind to voltage-sensitive sodium channels and alter their function. These ciguatoxins cause ciguatera fish poisoning. Because of the resemblance, there is a possibility that gambierol is also responsible for ciguatera fish poisoning. Because the natural source of gambierol is limited, biological studies are hampered. Therefore, chemical synthesis is required.

== Structure and reactivity ==
Gambierol is a ladder-shaped polyether, composed of eight ether rings, 18 stereocenters, and two challenging pyranyl rings having methyl groups that are in a 1,3-diaxial orientation to one another. Different structural analogues were synthesized to determine which groups and side chains attached to the gambierol are essential for its toxicity. Not only the fused polycyclic ether core is essential, but also the triene side chain at C51 and the C48-C49 double bond were indispensable. In the triene side chain, the double bond between C57 and C58 was essential. The C1 and C8 hydroxy groups were not essential, but they enhance the activity. The conjugate diene in the triene side chain also enhances the toxicity.

Structure of gambierol with the stereocenters and atom numbers indicated.

== Synthesis ==
The synthesis of gambierol consists of two tetracyclic precursor molecules, one alcohol and one acetic acid, that fuse together. The whole synthesis of gambierol is depicted in the figure below. After obtaining the octacyclic backbone, the tail is added via Stille coupling. The acetic acid (compound 1) and alcohol (compound 2) are converted to compound 3. The reaction of compound 3 with the titanium alkylidene from dibromide 1,1-dibromoethane, provides cyclic enol ether (compound 4). Oxidation of the alcohols gives majorly compound 5, but also compound 6. These are both ketones, but they have other stereochemistry. Compound 6 can be converted back in compound 5 with reactant c, thereby moving the equilibrium towards compound 5. This ketone can be converted further to produce reactive gambierol. By reductive cyclization of the D ring, the octacyclic core structure (compound 7) was made. Oxidation of compound 7 to the aldehyde was followed by formation of the diiodolefin. Stereoselective reduction, global deprotection and Stille coupling of compound 8 with dienyl stannane (compound 9) provide gambierol.

Visual representation of the synthesis of Gambierol. The tetracyclic acetic acid and tetracyclic alcohol together, form the octacyclic backbone of gambierol. Stille coupling of compound 8 to dienyl stannane (9) results in the active, toxic form of gambierol.Reaction conditions: (a) Dimethyldioxirane, CH2Cl2, -78 to 0 °C; DIBAL, CH2Cl2, 90% (10:1 mixture). (b) TPAP, NMO, 4 Å MS, CH2Cl2, rt, 97%. (c) imidazole, toluene, 110 °C, 100% (4:1 mix of 14:15). (d) CSA, MeOH, 0 °C, 90%. (e) Zn(OTf)2, EtSH, CH2Cl2, rt, 91%. (f) Ph3SnH, AIBN, toluene, 110 °C, 95%. (g) TPAP, NMO, 4 Å MS, CH2Cl2, rt, 98%. (h) CHI3, PPh3. KOt-Bu, 0 °C, 95%. (i) Zn-Cu couple, MeOH, AcOH, 0 °C, 85%. (j) SiF4, CH3CN, CH2Cl2, 0 °C, 89%. (k) 18, Pd2dba3‚CHCl3, P(furyl)3, CuI, DMSO, 40 °C, 75%.6

== Mechanism of action ==
Gambierol acts as a low-efficacy partial agonist at voltage-gated sodium channels (VGSC's) and as a high affinity inhibitor of voltage-gated potassium currents. It reduces the current through potassium channels irreversibly by stabilizing some of the closed channels. It acts as an intermembrane anchor where it displaces lipids and prohibits the voltage sensor domain of the channel from moving during physiologically important changes. This causes the channel to remain in the closed state and lowers the current. Gambierol also decreases the amplitude of inward sodium currents and hyperpolarizes the inward sodium current activation.

Gambierol has a high affinity for especially K_{v}1.1-1.5 channels and the K_{v}3.1 channel. K_{v}1.1-1.5 channels are responsible for repolarization of the membrane potential. The K_{v}1.3 channel however, has additional functions by regulating the Ca^{2+} signaling for T cells. If they are blocked, the T cells at the site of inflammation paralyse and are not reactivated. K_{v}3.1 channels are responsible for the high frequency firing of action potentials. If the K_{v} channels are closed, the depolarized membrane cannot repolarize to its resting state, causing a permanent action potential. This leads to paralysis of, for example, the respiratory system and therefore suffocation of the organism.

In neurons, gambierol has been reported to induce Ca^{2+} oscillations because of blockage of the voltage-gated potassium channels. The Ca^{2+} oscillations involve glutamate release and activation of NMDARs (glutamate receptors). This is however secondary to the blockade of potassium channels. The oscillations reduce the cytoplasmic Ca^{2+} threshold for the activation of Ras. Ras stimulates MAPKs to phosphorylate ERK1/2 which induce outgrowth of neurites. This is however dependent on intracellular concentrations and interaction of the NMDAR receptors They both work bidirectionally.

An increase in intracellular calcium concentration also activates the nitric oxide synthase to produce nitric oxide. In combination with a superoxide, nitric oxide forms peroxynitrite and causes oxidative stress in different sorts of tissues. This explains the toxic symptoms derived from intake of gambierol.

== Metabolism ==
Metabolism of gambierol is not known yet, but the expectation is that gambierol acts almost the same as the ciguatoxins. Ciguatoxins are polycyclic polyether compounds. Their molecular weight is between 1.023 and 1.159 Dalton. Gambierol is structurally similar to ciguatoxins and it can be synthesized together with them. Excretion of these ciguatoxins is largely via the feces and in smaller amounts via urine. The compounds are very lipophilic and will therefore diffuse to multiple organs and tissues, for example the liver, fat and the brain. The highest concentration was found in the brain, but muscles contained the highest total amount after a few days. Because gambierol is lipophilic, it can easily persist and accumulate in the fish food chain. The detoxification pathways are still unknown, but it is possible to eliminate the gambierol. This will take several months or years.

== Efficacy and side effects ==
The membrane potential and calcium signaling in T lymphocytes are controlled by ion channels. T cells can be activated if membrane potential and calcium signaling are altered, because they are coupled to signal transduction pathways. If these signal transduction pathways are disrupted, it can prevent the T cells from responding to antigens. This is called immune suppression. Gambierol is a potent blocker of potassium channels, which for a part determine the membrane potential. Gambierol is therefore a good option for the development of a drug that can be used in immunotherapy. This is for example used in diseases like multiple sclerosis, diabetes mellitus type 1 and rheumatoid arthritis.

Treatment with gambierol is not being used yet, because the compound is toxic and also blocks other channels and thereby disrupts important processes. Intake of gambierol can also cause pain, because Kv1.1 and Kv1.4 channels are blocked and that increases the excitability of central circuits. It also causes illness for several weeks. This is explained by the fact that gambierol is very lipophilic. Lipophilic compounds have high affinity for the lipid bilayer of cell membranes. It is likely that gambierol remains in the cell membrane for days or a few weeks, which explains the long term illness associated with gambierol treatment. There are also other symptoms already explained by the mechanism of action of gambierol, for example difficulties with respiration and hypotension.

Gambierol is also an interesting compound in research into treatments of pathologies like Alzheimer's disease, which are caused by increased expression of β-amyloid and/or tau hyperphosphorylation. Increases in β-amyloid accumulation and/or tau phosphorylation affects neurons the most. The neurons will then be degenerated and therefore this process has effects on the nervous system. However, gambierol can reduce this overexpression of β-amyloid and/or tau hyperphosphorylation in vitro and in vivo.

Gambierols function in inducing outgrowth of neurites in a bidirectional manner can potentially be used after neural injury. After for example a trauma or a stroke, gambierol can be used to change the structural plasticity of the brain. The possibility of gambierol to cross the blood–brain barrier is very important in this case.

== Toxicity ==
Poisoning by gambierol is normally caused after eating contaminated fish. Gambierol exhibits potent toxicity against mice at 50-80 μg/kg by intraperitoneal injection or 150 μg/kg when consumed orally. Symptoms resemble those of ciguatera poisoning. The symptoms concerning the gastrointestinal tract are:

- Abdominal pain
- Nausea
- Vomiting
- Diarrhea
- Painful defecation

The neurological symptoms include:

- Paradoxical temperature reversion; cold objects feel hot and vice versa.
- Dental pain; teeth feel loose.

== Treatment ==
There is no known antidote for gambierol poisoning.
