= Gambierdiscus belizeanus =

Scientific classification
- Domain: Eukaryota
- Clade: Diaphoretickes
- Clade: SAR
- Clade: Alveolata
- Phylum: Myzozoa
- Superclass: Dinoflagellata
- Class: Dinophyceae
- Order: Gonyaulacales
- Family: Ostreopsidaceae
- Genus: Gambierdiscus
- Species: G. belizeanus

Binomial name
- Gambierdiscus belizeanus Faust, 1995

Species of single-celled organism

Gambierdiscus belizeanus is a species of dinoflagellate, first found in Belize.

Gambierdiscus belizeanus cells are 53–67 pm long, 54–63 μm wide, and 92–98 μm in dorsoventral depth. Cells are deeply areolated, ellipsoid in apical view, and compressed anteroposteriorly. Its cells are identified by their long, narrow, pentagonal, posterior intercalary plate (1p) wedged between the wide postcingular plates 2″’and 4″; 1p occupies approximately 20% of the width of the hypotheca.
