= Polyring forming processes =

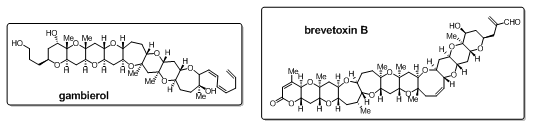
Fig. 1: Representative examples of synthetic targeting using polyring forming processes

Polycyclic natural products such as marine toxin gambierol and brevetoxin B (Fig. 1) are intriguing targets in organic synthesis. Polyring forming processes are applied to the total synthesis of these polycyclic molecules. Short sequences of reactions are used in an iterative fashion to build the successive ring structures.

== Brevetoxin B synthesis ==
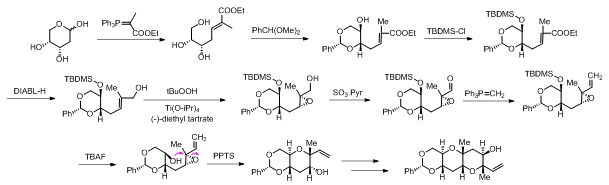
Fig. 2: Polyring forming processes in the Nicolaou synthesis of brevetoxin B

Brevetoxin B was first synthesized by K. C. Nicolaou and co-workers in 1995. Along the campaign towards completion of the total synthesis of brevetoxin B, polyring forming processes that consists of iterative epoxide ring-opening reactions was used to construct the ether linkages in one fragment of brevetoxin B (Fig. 2).

== Polypyran synthesis ==
Fig. 3: Mori's iterative polypyran synthesis

Mori and co-workers have developed a short iterative strategy for the synthesis of polypyran domains in natural products (Fig. 3). This strategy is also based on epoxide ring-opening reactions and consists totally 6 steps in each iterative cycle. The epoxide is installed using oxiranyl anions generated from reacting epoxide B with strong base such as n-butyllithium. Treating the product C with acid afforded the desired ring product which can be further converted to the next precursor D in four steps.
