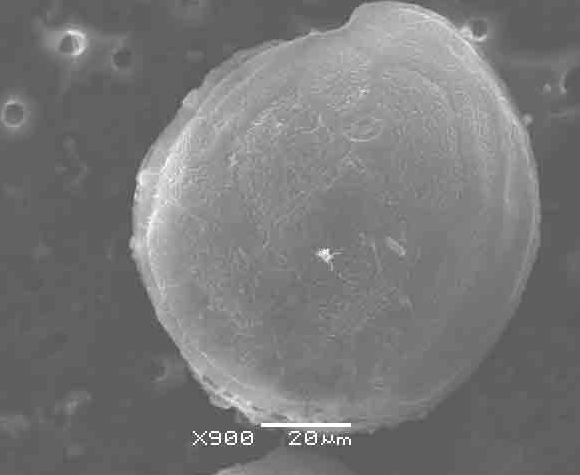
- Gambierdiscus toxicus

Scientific classification
- Domain: Eukaryota
- Clade: Diaphoretickes
- Clade: SAR
- Clade: Alveolata
- Phylum: Myzozoa
- Superclass: Dinoflagellata
- Class: Dinophyceae
- Order: Gonyaulacales
- Family: Ostreopsidaceae
- Genus: Gambierdiscus; Adachi & Fukuyo, 1979

Species
- See text

Diversity
- 12 species

= Gambierdiscus =

Genus of protists

Gambierdiscus is a genus of marine dinoflagellates that produce ciguatoxins, a type of toxin that causes the foodborne illness known as ciguatera. They are usually epiphytic on macroalgae growing on coral reefs.

== Morphology ==
Gambierdiscus cells generally have a lenticular shape with a depression on the ventral side of the cell, from where the two dissimilar flagella arise. Gambierdiscus cells have an orange to brown colour due to the assessory pigments peridinin, diadinoxanthin and dinoxanthin.

== Distribution ==
The marine dinoflagellate genus Gambierdiscus occurs globally in tropic and subtropic regions. It mainly grows attached to macroalgae and coralline turfalgae. Thus, it does not form visible surface blooms like many other harmful dinoflagellate species (red tides). A decrease in coral reefs due to bleaching, pollution or overfishing usually facilitates the growth of macroalgae, which can cause spreading of this epiphytic dinoflagellate genus.

== Ciguatera ==
Several Gambierdicus species produce potent toxin such as ciguatoxin and maitotoxin, which cause ciguatera fish poisoning. Humans often consume the toxins, as herbivorous fish, which feed on macroalgae, ingest the dinoflagellates. Afterwards, carnivorous fish, which are targeted by fishing industries, move the toxins further up the food chain. Ciguatera is the most common form of seafood poisoning caused by harmful algal blooms in the world and its incidence and range appear to spread. Best estimates indicate that more than 50,000 people are globally affected every year. Currently, G. polynesiensis, G. excentricus and G. silvae are recognized as being highly toxic, but ongoing and future research might identify more toxic metabolites in other species.

Predictions of ciguatera outbreaks are very challenging, as toxin profiles differ a lot between different species. Additionally, our knowledge about the species diversity of Gambierdiscus is limited and the number of described Gambierdiscus species increases every year. Furthermore, toxin production of each species varies significantly over time and space due to changes in environmental conditions like nutrient concentrations and sea surface temperature. An increase in sea surface temperature in the future might cause spreading of Gambierdiscus species further towards the poles and result in more cases of ciguatera fish poisoning.

== Evolution and systematics ==
=== Species ===
The genus Gambierdiscus contains the following 12 species:

- Gambierdiscus australes Chinian & M.A.Faust
- Gambierdiscus belizeanus Faust
- Gambierdiscus caribaeus Vandersea et al.
- Gambierdiscus carolinianus Litaker et al.
- Gambierdiscus carpenteri Kibler et al.
- Gambierdiscus lapillus Kretzschmar, Hoppenrath & Murray
- Gambierdiscus pacificus Chinain & Faust
- Gambierdiscus polynesiensis Chinain & Faust
- Gambierdiscus ruetzleri Faust et al.
- Gambierdiscus silvae S. Fraga & F. Rodríguez
- Gambierdiscus toxicus Adachi & Fukuyo
- Gambierdiscus yasumotoi Holmes

=== Phylogeny ===
The following cladograms illustrate the internal relationships between the Gambierdiscus species as analyzed in 2014, through a phylogenetic analysis using different regions of the large ribosomal subunit or LSUrRNA.

LSUrRNA D1-D3

- - G. yasumotoi
  - - G. ruetzleri
    - - G. cf. yasumotoi
      - - - G. carolinianus
          - - G. polynesiensis
            - G. silvae
        - - - G. excentricus
            - G. australes
          - - - Gambierdiscus sp. type 2
              - - G. carpenteri
                - G. caribaeus
            - - - Gambierdiscus sp. ribotype 2
                - G. belizeanus
              - - G. scabrosus
                - - G. toxicus
                  - G. pacificus

LSUrRNA D8-D10

- - G. yasumotoi
  - - G. ruetzleri
    - - - G. carolinianus
        - - Gambierdiscus sp. type 3
          - - - G. polynesiensis
              - Gambierdiscus sp. type 4
            - G. silvae
      - - - - G. excentricus
            - G. australes
          - - Gambierdiscus sp. type 2
            - - G. carpenteri
              - G. caribaeus
        - - G. belizeanus
          - - Gambierdiscus sp. ribotype 2
            - - G. scabrosus
              - - G. toxicus
                - G. pacificus
