= Coolia tropicalis =

Scientific classification
- Domain: Eukaryota
- Clade: Sar
- Clade: Alveolata
- Phylum: Dinoflagellata
- Class: Dinophyceae
- Order: Gonyaulacales
- Family: Ostreopsidaceae
- Genus: Coolia
- Species: C. tropicalis

Binomial name
- Coolia tropicalis Faust

Species of single-celled organism

Coolia tropicalis is a species of dinoflagellate, first found in Belize.

Its cell size ranges from 23–40 μm long, 25–39 μm wide and 35–65 μm in dorsoventral diameter. Cells are spherical, smooth and covered with scattered round pores. Its epitheca is smaller than its hypotheca. Its apical pore is straight, 7 μm long and situated in the apical plate complex. Cells of C. tropicalis are distinguished from C. monotis by the wedge-shaped plate 1′, a four-sided 3’ plate, and a short apical pore.
