= Oxytoxum elegans =

Scientific classification
- Domain: Eukaryota
- Clade: Sar
- Clade: Alveolata
- Division: Dinoflagellata
- Class: Dinophyceae
- Order: Peridiniales
- Family: Oxytoxaceae
- Genus: Oxytoxum
- Species: O. elegans

Binomial name
- Oxytoxum elegans Pavillard, 1916

Synonyms
- Centrodinium elegans (Pavillard) F.J.R.Taylor, 1976; Centrodinium frenguellii (Rampi) F.J.R.Taylor, 1976

Species of single-celled organism

Oxytoxum elegans is a species of dinoflagellates in the order Prorocentrales that was formerly classified as belonging to Peridiniales. It is found in the Gulf of Mexico, the Lebanese Exclusive Economic Zone waters and the North Atlantic Ocean.
