= Centrodinium =

Scientific classification
- Domain: Eukaryota
- Clade: Sar
- Clade: Alveolata
- Division: Dinoflagellata
- Class: Dinophyceae
- Order: Gonyaulacales
- Family: Ostreopsidaceae
- Genus: Centrodinium; Kofoid (1907)

Species
- See text

Genus of single-celled organisms

Centrodinium is genus of dinoflagellates in the order Gonyaulacales.

== Species ==
- Centrodinium biconicum (Murray & Whitting) F.J.R.Taylor
- Centrodinium complanatum (Cleve) Kofoid
- Centrodinium deflexoides Balech
- Centrodinium deflexum Kofoid
- Centrodinium elongatum Kofoid
- Centrodinium eminens Bohm
- Centrodinium expansum Kofoid & Michener
- Centrodinium intermedium Pavillard
- Centrodinium maximum Pavillard
- Centrodinium michaelsarsii (Gaarder) F.J.R.Taylor
- Centrodinium mimeticum (Balech) F.J.R.Taylor
- Centrodinium ovalis (Pavillard) Hernández-Becerril
- Centrodinium pacificum (Rampi) F.J.R.Taylor
- Centrodinium pavillardii F.J.R.Taylor
- Centrodinium porulosum Kofoid & Michener
- Centrodinium pulchrum Bohm
- Centrodinium punctatum (Cleve) F.J.R.Taylor

Names brought to synonymy

- Centrodinium elegans (Pavillard) F.J.R.Taylor accepted as Oxytoxum elegans Pavillard
- Centrodinium frenguellii (Rampi) F.J.R.Taylor accepted as Oxytoxum elegans Pavillard
- Centrodinium globosum (Kofoid) F.J.R.Taylor accepted as Heterodinium globosum Kofoid
- Centrodinium latum (Gaarder) F.J.R.Taylor accepted as Oxytoxum reticulatum (Stein) Schütt
- Centrodinium reticulatum (Stein) Loeblich Jr. & Loeblich III accepted as Oxytoxum reticulatum (Stein) Schütt
- Centrodinium tesselatum (Stein) Loeblich Jr. & Loeblich III accepted as Oxytoxum tesselatum (Stein) F.Schütt
