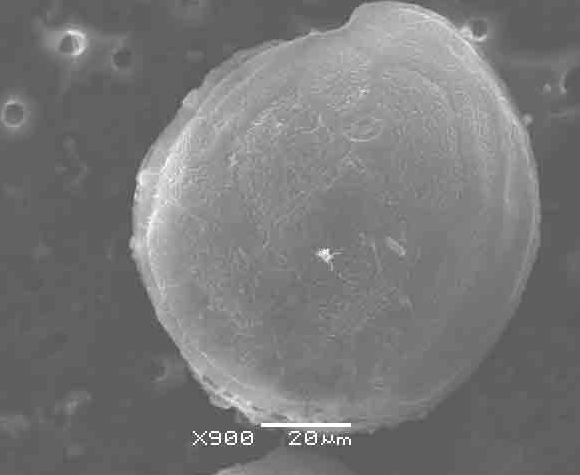

Scientific classification
- Domain: Eukaryota
- Clade: Sar
- Clade: Alveolata
- Phylum: Dinoflagellata
- Class: Dinophyceae
- Order: Gonyaulacales
- Family: Ostreopsidaceae
- Genus: Gambierdiscus
- Species: G. toxicus

Binomial name
- Gambierdiscus toxicus R.Adachi & Y.Fukuyo, 1979

= Gambierdiscus toxicus =

Species of protist

Gambierdiscus toxicus is a species of photosynthetic unicellular eukaryote belonging to the Alveolata, part of the SAR supergroup. It is a dinoflagellate which can cause the foodborne illness ciguatera, and is known to produce several natural polyethers including ciguatoxin, maitotoxin, gambieric acid, and gambierol. The species was discovered attached to the surface of brown macroalgae.

== Taxonomy ==
This species was first described by Adachi, R. & Fukuyo, Y in 1979 using samples collected around Gambier Islands. Which was split into five different species (Gambierdiscus caribaeus, Gambierdiscus carolinianus, Gambierdiscus carpenteri, Gambierdiscus ruetzleri and Gambierdiscus toxicus) according to their morphological characteristic of thecal structure, and the sequence of both D1–D3 and D8–D10 regions in large-subunit rDNA.

== Distribution ==
This species can be found in tropical and subtropical regions in Pacific Ocean and Indian Ocean. It is often found at the surface of various macroalgae, dead coral, sand and in water column suggesting that the certain chemical compounds in algal exudates may play an important role in the process of attachment . In the presence of light, the attached cell will detach from the substrate and start swimming in water column. When the disturbance is over the swimming cells will again attach to the matrix.

== Secondary metabolites ==
This algae species is capable of producing a variety of bioactive polyketide natural products such as ciguatoxin with characteristic fused-ring cyclic polyether structure. It is believed that the biosynthesis pathway involves epoxide as an intermediate which then undergoes a cyclization reaction to form the fused-ring cyclic polyether structure.
