= Maitotoxin =

Chemical compound

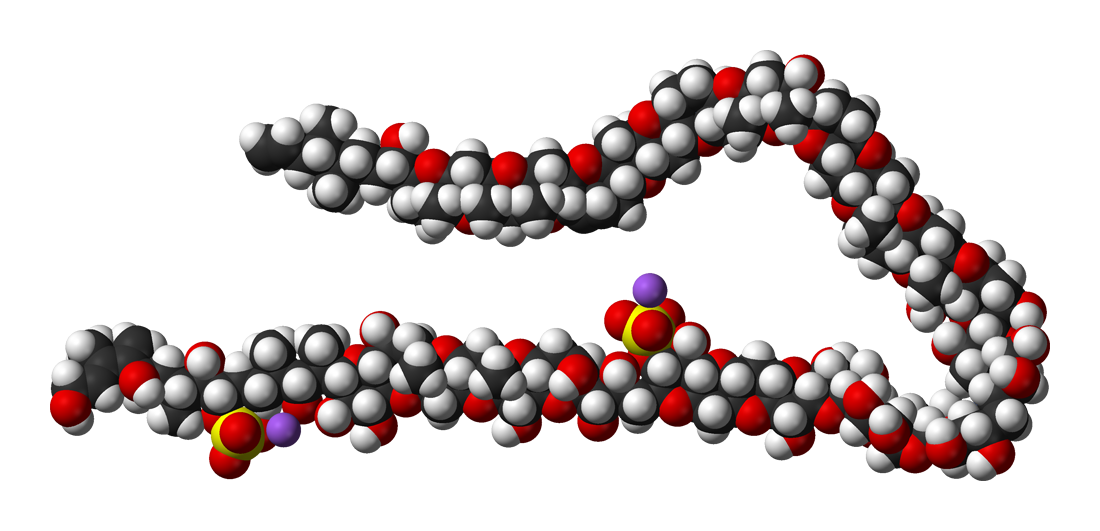
- Space-filling model of the maitotoxin molecule

Names
- Systematic IUPAC name Disodium (1^{2}S,1^{4a}R,1^{5a}S,1^{6a}R,1^{7a}S,1^{8}Z,1^{10a}R,1^{11a}S,1^{12a}R,1^{13a}S,1^{14a}R,1^{16}R,1^{17}R,1^{18a}S,1^{19a}R,1^{21a}S,1^{22a}R,1^{23a}S,1^{24a}R,1^{25a}S,1^{26a}R,1^{27a}S,2^{2}S,2^{4a}R,2^{5a}S,2^{6a}R,2^{7a}S,2^{8a}R,2^{9a}S,2^{11}R,2^{12}R,2^{13a}R,2^{14}S,2^{14a}S,2^{15a}R,2^{17a}S,2^{18a}R,2^{19a}S,3^{2}R,3^{3}R,3^{4a}S,3^{6}S,3^{7}R,3^{8}R,3^{8a}S,5R,7R,8^{2}S,8^{3}R,8^{4a}S,8^{6}R,8^{7}R,8^{8}R,8^{8a}S,9^{2}R,9^{3}R,9^{4}R,9^{4a}S,9^{5a}S,9^{6a}R,9^{7a}S,9^{8}R,9^{9}R,9^{10}S,9^{11a}R,9^{12a}S,9^{13a}R,9^{14}R,9^{14a}R,11S,12R,13^{2}S,13^{3}R,13^{4}S,13^{4a}S,13^{5a}R,13^{6a}S,13^{7a}R,13^{8}S,13^{8a}S,13^{10}S,13^{11}R,13^{12a}R,13^{13a}S,13^{14a}R,13^{15a}S,13^{17}R,13^{17a}R)-1^{2}-[(1S,2R,4R,5S)-1,2-dihydroxy-4,5-dimethyloct-7-en-1-yl]-1^{17},2^{11},2^{14},3^{3},3^{7},3^{8},5,7,8^{3},8^{7},8^{8},9^{3},9^{4},9^{8},9^{14},11,12,13^{3},13^{4},13^{8},13^{11},13^{17}-docosahydroxy-1^{4a},1^{5a},1^{6a},1^{14a},1^{16},1^{19a},1^{21a},1^{22a},2^{5a},2^{7a},2^{9a},2^{14a},2^{17a},13^{13a},13^{15a}-pentadecamethyl-13^{2}-[(2R,3R,4R,7S,8R,9R,11R,13E)-3,8,11,15-tetrahydroxy-4,9,13-trimethyl-12-methylidene-7-(sulfonatooxy)pentadec-13-en-2-yl]-1^{3},1^{4},1^{4a},1^{5a},1^{6},1^{6a},1^{7a},1^{10},1^{10a},1^{11a},1^{12},1^{12a},1^{13a},1^{14},1^{14a},1^{16},1^{17},1^{18},1^{18a},1^{19a},1^{20},1^{21},1^{21a},1^{22a},1^{23},1^{23a},1^{24a},1^{25},1^{25a},1^{26a},1^{27},1^{27a},2^{2},2^{3},2^{4},2^{4a},2^{5a},2^{6},2^{6a},2^{7a},2^{8},2^{8a},2^{9a},2^{10},2^{11},2^{12},2^{13a},2^{14},2^{14a},2^{15a},2^{16},2^{17},2^{17a},2^{18a},2^{19},2^{19a},3^{2},3^{3},3^{4},3^{4a},3^{6},3^{7},3^{8},3^{8a},8^{2},8^{3},8^{4},8^{4a},8^{6},8^{7},8^{8},8^{8a},9^{3},9^{4},9^{4a},9^{5a},9^{6},9^{6a},9^{7a},9^{8},9^{9},9^{10},9^{11a},9^{12},9^{12a},9^{13a},9^{14},9^{14a},13^{3},13^{4},13^{4a},13^{5a},13^{6},13^{6a},13^{7a},13^{8},13^{8a},13^{10},13^{11},13^{12},13^{12a},13^{13a},13^{14},13^{14a},13^{15a},13^{16},13^{17},13^{17a}-octahectahydro-1^{2}H,9^{2}H,13^{2}H-1(16)-pyrano[2′′′ ′,3′′′ ′:5′′′,6′′′]pyrano[2′′′,3′′′:6′′,7′′]oxepino[2′′,3′′:5′,6′]pyrano[2′,3′:5,6]pyrano[3,2-b]pyrano[2′′′,3′′′:5′′,6′′]pyrano[2′′,3′′:5′,6′]pyrano[2′,3′:5,6]pyrano[2,3-g]oxocina-2(2,12)-bis(pyrano[2′′,3′′:5,6]pyrano[2′,3′:5,6]pyrano)[3,2-b:2′,3′-f]oxepina-13(10)-pyrano[3,2-b]pyrano[2′′′,3′′′:5′′,6′′]pyrano[2′′,3′′:5′,6′]pyrano[2′,3′:5,6]pyrano[2,3-f]oxepina-9(2,10)-dipyrano[2,3-e:2′,3′-e′]pyrano[3,2-b:5,6-b′]dipyrana-3,8(2,6)-bis(pyrano[3,2-b]pyrana)tridecaphan-9^{9}-yl sulfate

Identifiers
| CAS Number | 59392-53-9 |
| 3D model (JSmol) | Interactive image |
| ChEMBL | ChEMBL2152261 |
| ChemSpider | 25991548 |
| ECHA InfoCard | 100.227.039 |
| KEGG | C16854 |
| PubChem CID | 71460273 |
| UNII | 9P59GES78D |
| CompTox Dashboard (EPA) | DTXSID10880012 |
- InChI: InChI=1S/C164H258O68S2.2Na/c1-24-26-65(2)68(5)41-74(168)117(179)85-33-36-152(11)106(203-85)55-109-162(21,231-152)64-161(20)105(210-109)51-89-83(220-161)28-25-27-82-99(199-89)59-157(16)108(202-82)56-107-153(12,230-157)39-38-151(10)112(211-107)61-158(17)111(224-151)54-101(176)163(22,232-158)103-32-31-84-90(204-103)53-110-156(15,219-84)62-113-150(9,223-110)37-34-102-155(14,225-113)63-114-164(23,227-102)147(192)149-159(18,226-114)58-81(175)134(218-149)133-79(173)47-93-136(216-133)120(182)119(181)92(200-93)44-72(166)43-76(170)131-77(171)46-94-137(214-131)122(184)124(186)143(207-94)145-126(188)125(187)144-146(217-145)128(190)139-97(208-144)50-88-87(206-139)49-96-138(205-88)127(189)141(229-234(196,197)198)95(201-96)45-75(169)118(180)132-78(172)48-98-140(215-132)129(191)148-160(19,221-98)60-100-91(209-148)52-104-154(13,222-100)57-80(174)135-142(212-104)123(185)121(183)130(213-135)71(8)115(177)67(4)29-30-86(228-233(193,194)195)116(178)69(6)42-73(167)70(7)66(3)35-40-165;;/h24-25,28,35,65,67-69,71-149,165-192H,1,7,26-27,29-34,36-64H2,2-6,8-23H3,(H,193,194,195)(H,196,197,198);;/q;2*+1/p-2/b28-25-,66-35+;;/t65-,67+,68+,69+,71+,72+,73+,74+,75-,76+,77+,78+,79+,80+,81+,82+,83-,84+,85-,86-,87-,88+,89+,90-,91-,92-,93-,94-,95-,96+,97-,98+,99-,100+,101+,102+,103-,104+,105-,106-,107+,108-,109+,110+,111-,112-,113+,114+,115+,116+,117-,118+,119-,120+,121+,122+,123-,124+,125+,126+,127+,128+,129-,130-,131-,132-,133+,134+,135+,136+,137+,138+,139-,140+,141-,142-,143+,144-,145+,146+,147-,148+,149+,150-,151+,152+,153-,154-,155-,156-,157+,158+,159-,160-,161+,162-,163+,164+;;/m0../s1 Key: NWQUHAJRFNRIIU-DVGFTKJRSA-L; InChI=1/C164H258O68S2.2Na/c1-24-26-65(2)68(5)41-74(168)117(179)85-33-36-152(11)106(203-85)55-109-162(21,231-152)64-161(20)105(210-109)51-89-83(220-161)28-25-27-82-99(199-89)59-157(16)108(202-82)56-107-153(12,230-157)39-38-151(10)112(211-107)61-158(17)111(224-151)54-101(176)163(22,232-158)103-32-31-84-90(204-103)53-110-156(15,219-84)62-113-150(9,223-110)37-34-102-155(14,225-113)63-114-164(23,227-102)147(192)149-159(18,226-114)58-81(175)134(218-149)133-79(173)47-93-136(216-133)120(182)119(181)92(200-93)44-72(166)43-76(170)131-77(171)46-94-137(214-131)122(184)124(186)143(207-94)145-126(188)125(187)144-146(217-145)128(190)139-97(208-144)50-88-87(206-139)49-96-138(205-88)127(189)141(229-234(196,197)198)95(201-96)45-75(169)118(180)132-78(172)48-98-140(215-132)129(191)148-160(19,221-98)60-100-91(209-148)52-104-154(13,222-100)57-80(174)135-142(212-104)123(185)121(183)130(213-135)71(8)115(177)67(4)29-30-86(228-233(193,194)195)116(178)69(6)42-73(167)70(7)66(3)35-40-165;;/h24-25,28,35,65,67-69,71-149,165-192H,1,7,26-27,29-34,36-64H2,2-6,8-23H3,(H,193,194,195)(H,196,197,198);;/q;2*+1/p-2/b28-25-,66-35+;;/t65-,67+,68+,69+,71+,72+,73+,74+,75-,76+,77+,78+,79+,80+,81+,82+,83-,84+,85-,86-,87-,88+,89+,90-,91-,92-,93-,94-,95-,96+,97-,98+,99-,100+,101+,102+,103-,104+,105-,106-,107+,108-,109+,110+,111-,112-,113+,114+,115+,116+,117-,118+,119-,120+,121+,122+,123-,124+,125+,126+,127+,128+,129-,130-,131-,132-,133+,134+,135+,136+,137+,138+,139-,140+,141-,142-,143+,144-,145+,146+,147-,148+,149+,150-,151+,152+,153-,154-,155-,156-,157+,158+,159-,160-,161+,162-,163+,164+;;/m0../s1 Key: NWQUHAJRFNRIIU-NHOVDTRNBI
- SMILES: C[C@H](CC[C@@H]([C@@H]([C@H](C)C[C@H](C(=C)/C(=C/CO)/C)O)O)OS(=O)(=O)[O-])[C@H]([C@@H](C)[C@H]1[C@@H]([C@@H]([C@H]2[C@H](O1)[C@@H](C[C@]3([C@H](O2)C[C@H]4[C@H](O3)C[C@]5([C@H](O4)[C@H]([C@H]6[C@H](O5)C[C@H]([C@H](O6)[C@@H]([C@H](C[C@H]7[C@@H]([C@@H]([C@H]8[C@H](O7)C[C@H]9[C@H](O8)C[C@H]1[C@H](O9)[C@H]([C@@H]2[C@@H](O1)[C@@H]([C@H]([C@@H](O2)[C@H]1[C@@H]([C@H]([C@H]2[C@@H](O1)C[C@H]([C@@H](O2)[C@@H](C[C@H](C[C@H]1[C@@H]([C@H]([C@H]2[C@@H](O1)C[C@H]([C@@H](O2)[C@H]1[C@@H](C[C@]2([C@H](O1)[C@@H]([C@]1([C@H](O2)C[C@]2([C@H](O1)CC[C@]1([C@H](O2)C[C@]2([C@H](O1)C[C@H]1[C@H](O2)CC[C@H](O1)[C@]1([C@@H](C[C@H]2[C@](O1)(C[C@H]1[C@](O2)(CC[C@]2([C@H](O1)C[C@H]1[C@](O2)(C[C@H]2[C@H](O1)C/C=C\[C@H]1[C@H](O2)C[C@H]2[C@](O1)(C[C@]1([C@H](O2)C[C@H]2[C@](O1)(CC[C@H](O2)[C@H]([C@@H](C[C@@H](C)[C@@H](C)CC=C)O)O)C)C)C)C)C)C)C)O)C)C)C)C)C)O)C)O)O)O)O)O)O)O)O)O)O)O)O)O)OS(=O)(=O)[O-])O)O)O)O)C)C)O)O)O)O.[Na+].[Na+]

Properties
| Chemical formula | C_{164}H_{256}O_{68}S_{2}Na_{2} |
| Molar mass | 3422 g/mol |
- Except where otherwise noted, data are given for materials in their standard state (at 25 °C [77 °F], 100 kPa). verify (what is ?) Infobox references

Maitotoxin (MTX) is an extremely potent toxin produced by Gambierdiscus toxicus, a dinoflagellate species. Maitotoxin is so potent that it has been demonstrated that an intraperitoneal injection of 130 ng/kg was lethal in mice. Maitotoxin was named from the ciguateric fish Ctenochaetus striatus—called "maito" in Tahiti—from which maitotoxin was isolated for the first time. It was later shown that maitotoxin is actually produced by the dinoflagellate Gambierdiscus toxicus.

== Mechanism of toxicity ==
Maitotoxin activates calcium channels, leading to an increase in levels of cytosolic Ca^{2+} ions. The exact molecular target of maitotoxin is unknown, but it has been suggested that maitotoxin binds to the plasma membrane Ca^{2+} ATPase (PMCA) and turns it into an ion channel, similar to how palytoxin turns the Na^{+}/K^{+}-ATPase into a sodium channel. Ultimately, a necroptosis cascade is activated, resulting in membrane blebbing and eventually cell lysis. The toxicity of maitotoxin in mice is the highest for nonprotein toxins: the LD_{50} is 50 ng/kg.

== Molecular structure ==
The molecule itself is a system of 32 fused rings and is notable for being one of the largest and most complex non-protein, non-polysaccharide molecules produced by any organism. Maitotoxin includes 32 ether rings, 22 methyl groups, 28 hydroxyl groups, and 2 sulfuric acid esters and has an amphipathic structure. Its structure was established through analysis using nuclear magnetic resonance at Tohoku University, Harvard University and the University of Tokyo in combination with mass spectrometry, and synthetic chemical methods. However, Andrew Gallimore and Jonathan Spencer have questioned the structure of maitotoxin at a single ring-junction (the J–K junction), based purely on biosynthetic considerations and their general model for marine polyether biogenesis. K. C. Nicolaou and Michael Frederick argue that despite this biosynthetic argument, the originally proposed structure could still be correct. The controversy has yet to be resolved.

== Biosynthesis ==
The molecule is produced in nature via a polyketide synthase pathway.

== Total synthesis ==
Since 1996 the Nicolaou research group is involved in an effort to synthesise the molecule via total synthesis although as of 2015 the project is on hold due to lack of funding.

== See also ==
- Palytoxin
- Ciguatera
