= Ciguatoxin =

Group of chemical compounds

Chemical structure of the ciguatoxin CTX1B

Ciguatoxins are a class of toxic polycyclic polyethers found in fish that cause ciguatera.

There are several different chemicals in this class. "CTX" is often used as an abbreviation.

- Ciguatoxin 1 – CID 5311333 from PubChem
- Ciguatoxin 2 – CID 6441260 from PubChem
- Ciguatoxin 3 – CID 6444399 from PubChem
- Ciguatoxin 4B (Gambiertoxin 4b) – CID 6450530 from PubChem

== Toxic effect on humans ==
Ciguatoxins do not seem to harm the fish that carry them, but they are poisonous to humans. They cannot be smelled or tasted and cannot be destroyed by cooking. Rapid testing for this toxin in food is not standard.

Some ciguatoxins lower the threshold for opening excitatory voltage-gated sodium channels in the nervous system. Opening a sodium channel causes depolarization, which could sequentially cause paralysis, heart arrhythmia, and changing the senses of heat and cold. Such poisoning from ciguatoxins is known as ciguatera.

Ciguatoxins are lipophilic, able to cross the blood–brain barrier, and can cause both central and peripheral neurologic symptoms.

The major symptoms will develop within 1–3 hours of toxin ingestion: vomiting, diarrhea, numbness of extremities, mouth and lips, reversal of hot and cold sensation, muscle and joint aches. The symptoms may last from days to weeks or even months depending on each individual situation. There is no known antidote, though several therapeutic targets have been identified. The LD_{50} of ciguatoxin in mice is around 200 to 300 ng/kg.

== Bioaccumulation ==
Ciguatoxin is produced by Gambierdiscus toxicus, a type of dinoflagellate. The phenomenon occurs in the Caribbean Sea, Hawaii, and coastal Central America. The toxin usually accumulates in the skin, head, viscera, and roe of big reef fish like grouper, wrasse, triggerfish, lionfish, and amberjack. It also affects barracuda, snapper, hogfish, king mackerel, sea bass and moray eels.

== See also ==
- Brevetoxin
- Domoic acid
- Okadaic acid
- Saxitoxin
- Tetrodotoxin
