= Ciguatera fish poisoning =

Foodborne illness

- Other names: Ciguatera, ciguatera food poisoning
- Chemical structure of one of the ciguatoxins
- Specialty: Toxicology
- Symptoms: Diarrhea, vomiting, numbness, itchiness, sensitivity to hot and cold, dizziness, weakness, muscle aches
- Usual onset: 30 min to 2 days
- Duration: Few weeks to months
- Causes: exposure to polyether toxins (ciguatoxins, maitotoxin, and palytoxin) found within certain marine fish and invertebrates
- Risk factors: barracuda, grouper, moray eel, amberjack, sea bass, sturgeon, parrotfish, red snapper, surgeonfish
- Diagnostic method: Based on symptoms and recently eating fish
- Differential diagnosis: Paralytic shellfish poisoning, neurotoxic shellfish poisoning, scombroid food poisoning, pufferfish poisoning
- Treatment: Mannitol, gabapentin, amitriptyline
- Prognosis: Risk of death ~ 0.1%
- Frequency: c. 50,000 per year

Ciguatera fish poisoning (CFP), also known as ciguatera, is a foodborne illness caused by eating tropical reef fish contaminated with ciguatoxins. Such individual fish are said to be ciguatoxic. Symptoms may include diarrhea, vomiting, numbness, itchiness, dysesthesia, sensitivity to hot and cold, dizziness, and weakness with lethargy. The onset of symptoms varies with the amount of toxin absorbed. If a large quantity of toxins is consumed, symptoms may appear within half an hour. At lower amounts, symptoms may take a few days to appear. Diarrhea may last up to four days. Symptoms may last a few weeks to a few months. Heart problems such as slow heart rate and low blood pressure may occur. Shoemaker, House, and Ryan published a case definition of a chronic form of ciguatera poisoning that may develop: "Roughly 5% of these victims will develop chronic ciguatera (CC), a widespread, multisymptom, multisystem, chronic illness that can last tens of years."

The specific toxins involved are ciguatoxins and maitotoxin. They are made by a small marine organism, Gambierdiscus toxicus, that grows on and around coral reefs in tropical and subtropical waters. These are eaten by herbivorous fish which in turn are eaten by larger carnivorous fish. The toxins become more concentrated as they move up the food chain. Implicated fishes include barracuda, grouper, moray eel, amberjack, sea bass, sturgeon, parrotfish, red snapper, and surgeonfish. Diagnosis is based on a person's symptoms together with having recently eaten fish. If a number of those who eat the same fish develop symptoms the diagnosis becomes more likely. If some of the fish they had previously eaten is available this can also be tested to confirm the diagnosis.

Preventive efforts include not eating reef fish, not eating high-risk fish such as barracuda, and not eating fish liver, roe, or fish heads. The toxins have no taste or smell, and cannot be destroyed by conventional cooking. There is no specific treatment for ciguatera fish poisoning once it occurs. Mannitol may be considered, but the evidence supporting its use is not very strong. Gabapentin or amitriptyline may be used to treat some of the symptoms.

In 2017, the United States Centers for Disease Control (CDC) estimated that around 50,000 cases occur globally each year. Other estimates suggest up to 500,000 cases per year. The risk of death from poisoning is less than 1 in 1,000 according to the CDC. It is the most frequent seafood poisoning, and up to 5% of patients may develop chronic symptoms, which are treatable using the protocols for Chronic Inflammatory Response Syndrome (CIRS) It occurs most commonly in the Pacific Ocean, Indian Ocean, and the Caribbean Sea between the latitudes of 35°N and 35°S. The risk of the condition appears to be increasing due to coral reef deterioration and increasing trade in seafood. Descriptions of the condition date back to at least 1511. The current name, introduced in 1787, is of Cuban Spanish origin and originally referred to the gastropod Cittarium pica.

== Signs and symptoms ==
Hallmark symptoms of ciguatera in humans include gastrointestinal, cardiovascular, and neurological effects. Gastrointestinal symptoms include nausea, vomiting, and diarrhea, usually followed by neurological symptoms such as headaches, muscle aches, numbness of the extremities, mouth and lips, reversal of hot and cold sensation, ataxia, vertigo, and hallucinations. Severe cases of ciguatera can also result in cold allodynia, which is a burning sensation on contact with cold. Neurological symptoms can persist and ciguatera poisoning is occasionally misdiagnosed as multiple sclerosis. Cardiovascular symptoms include bradycardia, tachycardia, hypotension, hypertension, orthostatic tachycardia, exercise intolerance, and abnormal electrocardiograms. Death from the condition can occur, but is very rare.

Dyspareunia and other ciguatera symptoms have developed in otherwise healthy males and females following sexual intercourse with partners suffering ciguatera poisoning, signifying that the toxin may be sexually transmitted. Diarrhea and facial rashes have been reported in breastfed infants of poisoned mothers, suggesting that the polyether toxins partition into breast milk.

The symptoms can last from weeks to months, and in extreme cases as long as 20 years, often leading to long-term disability. Most people do recover slowly over time, but genetically susceptible individuals are not able to remove the toxin and will remain sick indefinitely without medical treatment.

== Cause ==
Gambierdiscus toxicus is the primary dinoflagellate responsible for the production of a number of similar polyether toxins, including ciguatoxins, maitotoxin and possibly palytoxin. Other dinoflagellates that may cause ciguatera include other Gambierdiscus species and members of the genera Fukuyoa and Ostreopsis.

== Diagnosis ==
Diagnosis is based on a person's symptoms together with having recently eaten fish. If a number of those who eat the same fish have symptoms the diagnosis becomes more likely. If some of the fish they had previously eaten is available this can also be tested to confirm the diagnosis. Other potential causes such as paralytic shellfish poisoning (PSP), neurotoxic shellfish poisoning (NSP), scombrotoxin fish poisoning, and pufferfish poisoning should be excluded.

Transcriptomics can differentiate those with chronic ciguatera (CC) from controls. Those with CC should be evaluated for Chronic Inflammatory Response Syndrome (CIRS), which may include symptom checklists, visual contrast sensitivity (VCS) test, widely available lab tests such as "immune biomarkers, such as transforming growth factor beta (TGFb), vasoactive intestinal peptide (VIP), melanocyte stimulating hormone (MSH), split products of complement activation, and many others," and NeuroQuant brain MRI analysis.

The reversal of hot and cold sensations is an occasional symptom of CFP that may help differentiate it from norovirus.

== Treatment ==
Ciguatera poisoning is a treatable condition. Genetically susceptible individuals can develop a long-term illness due to inability to clear the Ciguatera toxins; these people can be treated using the protocol for Chronic Inflammatory Response Syndrome (CIRS). Acutely, the mainstay of treatment is supportive care, but once the toxin is identified, CIRS treatment should start as soon as possible, as it will speed recovery, even for those without the genetic susceptibility.

There is some evidence that calcium channel blockers like nifedipine and verapamil are effective in treating some of the symptoms that remain after the initial sickness passes, such as poor circulation and shooting pains through the chest. These symptoms are due to vasoconstriction caused by maitotoxin and/or palytoxin. Ciguatoxin lowers the threshold for opening voltage-gated sodium channels in synapses of the nervous system. Opening a sodium channel causes depolarization, which could sequentially cause paralysis, vasoconstriction, and changing the senses of hot and cold. Some medications such as amitriptyline may reduce some symptoms, such as fatigue and paresthesia, although benefit does not occur in every case.

=== Mannitol ===
Mannitol was once used for poisoning after one study reported symptom reversal. Follow-up studies in animals and case reports in humans also found benefit from mannitol. However, a randomized, double-blind clinical trial found no difference between mannitol and normal saline. Despite this its use may still be considered.

== Epidemiology ==
The current estimated global incidence annually is 20,000 to 50,000 people, though a large number of cases are believed to go unreported.

Due to the limited habitats of ciguatoxin-producing microorganisms, ciguatera is common only in subtropical and tropical waters, particularly the Pacific and Caribbean, and usually is associated with fish caught in tropical reef waters. Exportation of reef fish, as well as tourism, often account for cases that develop in other regions.

Ciguatoxin is found in over 400 species of reef fish. Avoiding consumption of all reef fish is the only sure way to avoid exposure. Imported fish served in restaurants may contain the toxin and produce illness which often goes unexplained by physicians unfamiliar with the symptoms of a tropical toxin. Ciguatoxin can also occur in farm-raised salmon. Furthermore, species substitution, labeling a reef fish as a non-reef fish at restaurants and retail, can complicate efforts by consumers to avoid ciguatera.

=== 20th and 21st centuries ===
- In 1994, Nobel-Prize winning novelist Saul Bellow nearly died from ciguatera after eating red snapper on vacation in St. Martin, fictionalized in his last novel Ravelstein.
- In 2007, ten people in St. Louis, Missouri developed the disease after eating imported fish.
- In February 2008, the U.S. Food and Drug Administration (FDA) traced several outbreaks to the Flower Garden Banks National Marine Sanctuary in the northern Gulf of Mexico, near the Texas–Louisiana shoreline. The FDA advised seafood processors that ciguatera poisoning was reasonably likely to occur from eating several species of fish caught as far as 50 miles (80 km) from the sanctuary.
- From August 2010 to July 2011, there were eight outbreaks of ciguatera fish poisoning in New York City. Outbreaks were linked to barracuda and grouper purchased at a fish market in Queens, New York.
- In the first quarter of 2012, two restaurants in Lanzarote, Canary Islands are thought to have been the source of ciguatera poisoning, leading to new fishing regulations issued 18 April 2012. The first outbreak was reported in February 2012. Diners suffered with vomiting, diarrhoea and abdominal pain several hours after eating amberjack. The second case was in early April affecting six people who live in Lanzarote and had all eaten amberjack at a local restaurant.
- In March 2014, nine people were hospitalised near Macksville, New South Wales, Australia after a recreational fisherman caught a 55 lb (25 kg) Spanish mackerel (Scomberomorus commersoni) off Scotts Head (NSW) and then shared it among his friends and family.
- In April 2015, fourteen crew members of a potash ship were hospitalized in Saint John, New Brunswick, Canada after consuming tropical fish obtained from international waters.
- In September 2016, a British holidaymaker died while on honeymoon in Mexico after consuming fish contaminated with the toxins.
- During October 2016, more than 100 people suffered from ciguatera poisoning after eating fish heads supplied by an export firm in Mangalore, India.

== History and folklore ==
Ciguatera was first described by the Scottish naturalist, William Anderson, when he was onboard HMS Resolution in 1774.

Researchers suggest that ciguatera outbreaks caused by warm climatic conditions in part propelled the migratory voyages of Polynesians between 1000 and 1400 CE.

=== Folk tales ===
In Northern Australia, where ciguatera is a common problem, two different folk science methods are widely believed to detect whether fish harbor significant ciguatoxin. The first method is that flies are supposed not to land on contaminated fish. The second is that cats will either refuse to eat or vomit/display symptoms after eating contaminated fish.

On Grand Cayman and other islands the locals will test barracuda by placing a piece of the fish on the ground and allowing ants to crawl on it. If the ants do not avoid the flesh and will eat it, then the fish is deemed safe.

In Dominican Republic, another common belief is that during months whose names do not include the letter "R" (May through August), it is not recommended to eat certain kinds of fish, because they are more likely to be infected by the ciguatera toxin.

The validity of many of these tests has been scientifically rejected.

=== Folk remedies ===
Leaves of Heliotropium foertherianum (Boraginaceae) – also known as octopus bush – are used in many Pacific islands as a traditional medicine to treat ciguatera fish poisoning. Octopus bush leaves contain rosmarinic acid and derivatives, which are known for their antiviral, antibacterial, antioxidant, and anti-inflammatory properties.

An account of ciguatera poisoning from a linguistics researcher living on Malakula island, Vanuatu, indicates the local treatment: "We had to go with what local people told us: avoid salt and any seafood. Eat sugary foods. And they gave us a tea made from the roots of ferns growing on tree trunks. I don't know if any of that helped, but after a few weeks, the symptoms faded away".

Various Caribbean folk and ritualistic treatments originated in Cuba and nearby islands. The most common old-time remedy involves bed rest subsequent to a guanabana juice enema. In Puerto Rico, natives drink a tea made from mangrove buttons, purportedly high in B vitamins, to flush the toxic symptoms from the system. There has never been a funded study of these treatments. Other folk treatments range from directly porting and bleeding the gastrointestinal tract to "cleansing" the diseased with a dove during a Santería ritual.

== See also ==
- Red tide
- Scombroid food poisoning
- Palytoxin
