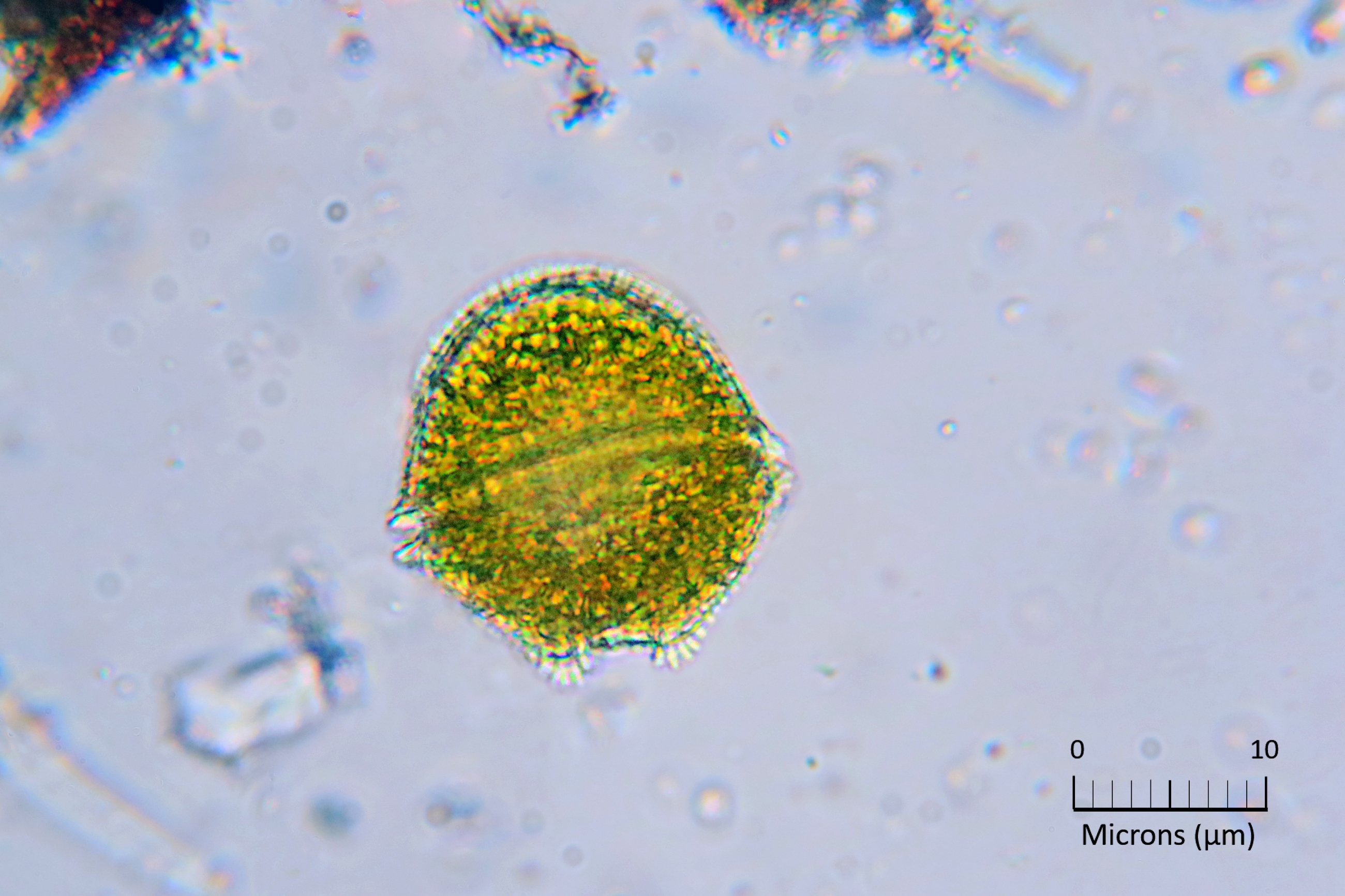
- Alexandrium minutum

Scientific classification
- Domain: Eukaryota
- Clade: Sar
- Clade: Alveolata
- Division: Dinoflagellata
- Class: Dinophyceae
- Order: Gonyaulacales
- Family: Ostreopsidaceae; Lindemann

Genera
- See text

= Ostreopsidaceae =

Family of single-celled organisms

Ostreopsidaceae is a family of free-living dinoflagellates found in marine environments.

== Genera ==
The World Register of Marine Species includes the following genera in the family :

- Alexandrium Halim
- Centrodinium Kofoid
- Coolia Meunier
- Fukuyoa Gomez, Qiu, Lopes & Lin
- Gambierdiscus Adachi & Fukuyo
- Ostreopsis J.Schmidt
