= Palytoxin =

Chemical compound

Names
- Preferred IUPAC name (2S,3R,5R,6E,8R,9S)-10-[(1^{2}R,1^{3}R,1^{5}S,4^{1}R,4^{3}R,4^{5}S,4^{6}R,6R,7R,8Z,10^{2}R,10^{3}S,10^{4}R,10^{5}R,10^{6}R,12R,13R,14R,15S,19Z,22R,23S,24R,26E,28Z,30S,32^{2}S,32^{3}R,32^{4}R,32^{5}S,32^{6}R,34R,35R,37^{2}R,37^{3}S,37^{4}R,37^{6}S,38R,39R,42S,43E,45S,46S,48^{2}S,48^{3}R,48^{4}R,48^{5}R,48^{6}R,50S,58^{1}S,58^{3}S,58^{5}R,58^{6}R,60S,66R,67S,68S,69R,70S,71^{2}R,71^{3}S,71^{4}R,71^{5}R,71^{6}R)-1^{5}-(Aminomethyl)-1^{3},6,7,10^{3},10^{4},10^{5},13,14,15,22,23,24,30,32^{3},32^{4},32^{5},34,35,37^{3},37^{4},38,39,42,46,48^{2},48^{3},48^{4},48^{5},50,66,67,68,69,70,71^{3},71^{4},71^{5}-heptatriacontahydroxy-12,45,58^{3},58^{5},60-pentamethyl-18-methylidene-4^{4},4^{7},58^{7},58^{8}-tetraoxa-10,32,37,48(2,6),71(2)-pentakis(oxana)-1(2)-oxolana-4(6,3),58(1,6)-bis(bicyclo[3.2.1]octana)henheptacontaphane-8,19,26,28,43-pentaen-71^{6}-yl]-N-{(1E)-3-[(3-hydroxypropyl)amino]-3-oxoprop-1-en-1-yl}-2,5,8,9-tetrahydroxy-3,7-dimethyldec-6-enamide

Identifiers
CAS Number	77734-91-9
3D model (JSmol)	Interactive image
Abbreviations	PTX
ChemSpider	9280425
ECHA InfoCard	100.162.538
PubChem CID	11105289
UNII	OQ17NC0MOV
CompTox Dashboard (EPA)	DTXSID90423027
- InChI: InChI=1S/C129H223N3O54/c1-62(29-33-81(143)108(158)103(153)68(7)47-93-111(161)117(167)110(160)91(180-93)36-35-76(138)82(144)51-73-50-74-53-92(178-73)90(177-74)38-37-89-85(147)52-75(61-130)179-89)23-20-28-78(140)105(155)77(139)26-18-13-16-25-70(135)48-94-112(162)118(168)113(163)97(181-94)55-84(146)83(145)54-95-107(157)87(149)57-96(182-95)106(156)80(142)34-32-69(134)31-30-65(4)88(150)60-129(176)125(174)123(173)115(165)99(184-129)49-71(136)24-15-10-9-11-19-40-128-59-64(3)58-127(8,186-128)100(185-128)44-63(2)22-14-12-17-27-79(141)109(159)116(166)120(170)122(172)124-121(171)119(169)114(164)98(183-124)56-86(148)102(152)66(5)45-72(137)46-67(6)104(154)126(175)132-42-39-101(151)131-41-21-43-133/h13,16,18,20,23,25,30-31,35-36,39,42,45,63-65,67-100,102-125,133-150,152-174,176H,1,9-12,14-15,17,19,21-22,24,26-29,32-34,37-38,40-41,43-44,46-61,130H2,2-8H3,(H,131,151)(H,132,175)/b18-13+,23-20-,25-16-,31-30+,36-35-,42-39+,66-45+/t63-,64-,65-,67+,68+,69+,70+,71-,72-,73-,74+,75-,76+,77+,78+,79+,80+,81-,82+,83+,84+,85+,86-,87+,88-,89+,90+,91+,92-,93+,94-,95+,96-,97+,98+,99+,100+,102+,103+,104-,105-,106+,107-,108+,109-,110+,111-,112-,113+,114-,115-,116-,117-,118+,119+,120+,121-,122-,123+,124-,125+,127+,128-,129-/m0/s1 Key: CWODDUGJZSCNGB-HQNRRURTSA-N; InChI=1/C129H223N3O54/c1-62(29-33-81(143)108(158)103(153)68(7)47-93-111(161)117(167)110(160)91(180-93)36-35-76(138)82(144)51-73-50-74-53-92(178-73)90(177-74)38-37-89-85(147)52-75(61-130)179-89)23-20-28-78(140)105(155)77(139)26-18-13-16-25-70(135)48-94-112(162)118(168)113(163)97(181-94)55-84(146)83(145)54-95-107(157)87(149)57-96(182-95)106(156)80(142)34-32-69(134)31-30-65(4)88(150)60-129(176)125(174)123(173)115(165)99(184-129)49-71(136)24-15-10-9-11-19-40-128-59-64(3)58-127(8,186-128)100(185-128)44-63(2)22-14-12-17-27-79(141)109(159)116(166)120(170)122(172)124-121(171)119(169)114(164)98(183-124)56-86(148)102(152)66(5)45-72(137)46-67(6)104(154)126(175)132-42-39-101(151)131-41-21-43-133/h13,16,18,20,23,25,30-31,35-36,39,42,45,63-65,67-100,102-125,133-150,152-174,176H,1,9-12,14-15,17,19,21-22,24,26-29,32-34,37-38,40-41,43-44,46-61,130H2,2-8H3,(H,131,151)(H,132,175)/b18-13+,23-20-,25-16-,31-30+,36-35-,42-39+,66-45+/t63-,64-,65-,67+,68+,69+,70+,71-,72-,73-,74+,75-,76+,77+,78+,79+,80+,81-,82+,83+,84+,85+,86-,87+,88-,89+,90+,91+,92-,93+,94-,95+,96-,97+,98+,99+,100+,102+,103+,104-,105-,106+,107-,108+,109-,110+,111-,112-,113+,114-,115-,116-,117-,118+,119+,120+,121-,122-,123+,124-,125+,127+,128-,129-/m0/s1 Key: CWODDUGJZSCNGB-HQNRRURTBU
- SMILES: NC[C@@H]1C[C@H]([C@H](O1)CC[C@H]1O[C@@H]2C[C@H](O[C@H]1C2)C[C@H]([C@@H](\C=C/[C@@H]2[C@H]([C@@H]([C@H]([C@H](O2)C[C@H]([C@H]([C@@H]([C@H](CCC(\C=C/C[C@H]([C@H]([C@@H](C/C=C/C=C\[C@H](C[C@H]2[C@@H]([C@H]([C@@H]([C@H](O2)C[C@H]([C@@H](C[C@@H]2[C@H]([C@@H](C[C@H](O2)[C@@H]([C@@H](CC[C@@H](/C=C/[C@@H]([C@H](C[C@]2([C@@H]([C@@H]([C@H]([C@H](O2)C[C@H](CCCCCCC[C@]21C[C@H](C[C@]([C@H](O2)C[C@H](CCCCC[C@H]([C@@H]([C@@H]([C@H]([C@H](O)[C@@H]2[C@H]([C@@H]([C@H]([C@H](O2)C[C@@H]([C@@H](/C(=C/[C@@H](C[C@H]([C@@H](C(O)=N\C=C\C(=NCCCO)O)O)C)O)/C)O)O)O)O)O)O)O)O)O)C)(O1)C)C)O)O)O)O)O)O)C)O)O)O)O)O)O)O)O)O)O)O)O)O)O)=C)O)O)O)C)O)O)O)O)O)O

Properties
Chemical formula	C_{129}H_{223}N_{3}O_{54}
Molar mass	2680.1386 grams/mol
Appearance	white amorphous hygroscopic solid
Melting point	decomposes at 300 °C
Solubility	Very soluble in water, dimethyl sulfoxide, pyridine; slightly soluble in methanol and ethanol; insoluble in chloroform and diethyl ether

Hazards
- Occupational safety and health (OHS/OSH)
Main hazards	Extremely toxic, symptoms of poisoning include: chest pains, breathing difficulties, tachycardia, unstable blood pressure and hemolysis.
- GHS labelling
Pictograms	(GHS06: Toxic)
- Except where otherwise noted, data are given for materials in their standard state (at 25 °C [77 °F], 100 kPa). verify (what is ?) Infobox references

Palytoxin, PTX or PLTX is an intense vasoconstrictor, and is considered to be one of the most poisonous non-protein substances known, second only to maitotoxin in terms of toxicity in mice.

Palytoxin is a polyhydroxylated and partially unsaturated compound (8 double bonds) with a long carbon chain. It has water-soluble and fat-soluble parts, 40 hydroxy groups and 64 chiral centers. Due to chirality and possible double bond cis-trans isomerism, it has over 10^{21} alternative stereoisomers. It is thermostable, and boiling contaminated seafood does not noticeably reduce toxicity. It remains stable in aqueous solutions for prolonged periods but rapidly decomposes in acidic or alkaline solutions. It has multiple analogues such as ostreocin-D, mascarenotoxin-A and -B.

Palytoxin occurs at least in tropics and subtropics where it is made by Palythoa corals and Ostreopsis dinoflagellates, or possibly by bacteria occurring in these organisms. It can be found in many more species like fish and crabs due to the process of biomagnification. It can also be found in various sponges, mussels, starfish and cnidaria.

People are rarely exposed to palytoxin. Exposures have happened in people who have eaten contaminated fish and crabs, but also in aquarium hobbyists who have handled Palythoa corals incorrectly and in those who have been exposed to certain algal blooms.

Palytoxin targets the sodium-potassium pump protein by locking it into a position where it allows passive transport of both sodium and potassium ions, thereby destroying the ion gradient that is essential for life. As palytoxin can affect every type of cell in the body, the symptoms can be very different for the various routes of exposure.

Palytoxin's chemical structure was solved in 1981 by two research groups independently from each other. Stereochemistry was solved in 1982. Palytoxin carboxylic acid was synthesized by Yoshito Kishi and colleagues in 1989 and actual palytoxin in 1994 by Kishi and Suh.

== History ==
=== Legend ===
According to an ancient Hawaiian legend, on the island of Maui near the harbor of Hana there was a village of fishermen haunted by a curse. Upon their return from the sea, one of the fishermen would go missing. One day, enraged by another loss, the fishermen assaulted a hunchbacked hermit deemed to be the culprit of the town's misery. While ripping the cloak off the hermit the villagers were shocked because they uncovered rows of sharp and triangular teeth within huge jaws. A shark god had been caught. It was clear that the missing villagers had been eaten by the god on their journeys to the sea. The men mercilessly tore the shark god into pieces, burned him and threw the ashes into a tide pool near the harbor of Hana. Shortly after, a thick brown "moss" started to grow on the walls of the tide pool causing instant death to victims hit by spears smeared with the moss. Thus was the evil of the demon. The moss growing in the cursed tide pool became known as "limu-make-o-Hana" which literally means "seaweed of death from Hana." The Hawaiians believed that an ill curse came over them if they tried to collect the deadly "seaweed".

=== Discovery ===
Palytoxin was first isolated, named and described from Palythoa toxica by Moore and Scheuer in a study published in 1971. They measured that its molar mass is approximately 3300 g/mol. They also identified it to be the substance that was probably responsible for the toxicity of P. toxica, but it was uncertain at the time if the coral also had other toxic compounds in it. It was then assessed by Walsh and Bowers that the limu-make-o-Hana was not a seaweed but a zoanthid coral, subsequently described as Palythoa toxica. Moore and Scheuer were aware of the study that Walsh and Bowers were writing.

=== Structure and total synthesis ===
In 1978 by plasmadesorption the mass of the palytoxin was measured to be 2861 g/mol and that it had 8 double bonds. As palytoxin is such a large molecule, it took some time before the complete structure (including stereochemistry) was elucidated. Uemura et al. solved its planar chemical structure first and published their results in January 1981. Shortly afterwards Moore and Bartolini solved the same structure and published their results in May 1981. Forementioned groups solved the structure independently from each other. Palytoxin's stereochemistry was solved first by Moore et al. in June 1982 and then by Uemura et al. in December in a study of four parts.

Palytoxin carboxylic acid was synthesized in 1989 by the group of Harvard professor Yoshito Kishi. Synthesis happened in 8 parts and then the parts were joined to form the carboxylic acid. In 1994 Kishi et al. succeeded in making the actual palytoxin from this carboxylic acid. The accomplishment of palytoxin carboxylic acid synthesis was described as "the Mount Everest of organic synthesis, the largest single molecule that anyone has ever even thought about making" by Crawford in 1989.

Direct observation of the crystal structure of palytoxin was made in 2022 using microcrystal electron diffraction and an antibody named scFv. Palytoxin is found to fold into a hairpin structure which, according to simulation, would facilitate its binding with the Na^{+}/K^{+}-ATPase.

== Occurrence ==
Some of the organisms that contain palytoxin or its close analogues are listed below. These are either able to produce these compounds or have been found to contain them in some occasions due to bioaccumulation.

Such corals are Palythoa caribeaorum, P. mammilosa, P. tuberculosa, P. toxica, P. vestitus, P. aff. margaritae, Zoanthus soanderi and Z. sociatus.

Such dinoflagellates are Ostreopsis lenticularis, O. siamensis, O. mascarensis and O. ovata.

Such fish are scrawled filefish, pinktail triggerfish, Ypsiscarus ovifrons, Decapterus macrosoma (shortfin scad), bluestripe herring and Epinephelus sp.

Such crabs are Lophozozymus pictor, Demania reynaudii and gaudy clown crab.

Certain bacteria might be able to produce palytoxin and may be the actual producers in some of the organisms listed above. Bacteria that have some evidence of palytoxin or its analogue production include Pseudomonas, Brevibacterium, Acinetobacter, Bacillus cereus, Vibrio sp. ja Aeromonas.

== Mechanism ==
The toxicity of palytoxin is due to its binding to external part of Na^{+}/K^{+}-ATPase (the sodium–potassium pump), where it interacts with the natural binding site of ouabain with very high affinity. Na^{+}/K^{+}-ATPase is a transmembrane protein, which is found on the surface of every vertebrate cell. The sodium–potassium pump is necessary for viability of all cells, and this explains the fact that palytoxin affects all cells. Palytoxin binding forms a channel within the sodium–potassium pump, through which monovalent positive ions such as sodium and potassium can diffuse freely, thereby destroying the ion gradient of the cell. Once palytoxin is bound to the pump, it flips constantly between open and normal conformations. The open conformation is more likely (over 90% probability). If palytoxin detaches, the pump will return to closed conformation. In open conformation, millions of ions diffuse through the pump per second, whereas only about one hundred ions per second are transported through a normally functioning transporter.

Loss of ion gradient leads to death and hemolysis of red blood cells, for example, and also to violent contractions of heart and other muscle cells.

First evidence of the mechanism described above was obtained in 1981 and the proposed mechanism was published in 1982. As the mechanism of action of palytoxin was so unlike any other, it was initially not widely accepted. This was primarily because it was not expected that a pump which provides active transport, could become an ion channel by binding of a compound such as palytoxin. Therefore, there were some alternative hypotheses, which were reviewed by Frelin and van Renterghem in 1995. The breakthrough research which is seen as proof for the sodium–potassium pump mechanism was performed in yeast cells (Saccharomyces cerevisiae). These cells do not have the sodium–potassium pump, and hence palytoxin does not affect them. But once they were given the DNA to encode for complete sheep Na^{+}/K^{+}-ATPase, they were killed by palytoxin.

== Toxicity ==
From intravenous (IV) animal studies the toxic dose (LD_{50}) of palytoxin via IV for humans has been estimated by extrapolation to be between 2.3 and 31.5 micrograms (μg) of palytoxin. An acute oral reference dose has been suggested to be 64 μg for a person with weight of 60 kg. Acute reference dose means a dose that can be safely ingested over a short period of time, usually during one meal or one day.

In comparison to IV injection, the toxicity of palytoxin in various animals via intramuscular and subcutaneous injections are 2.5 and 4–30 times higher, respectively. Upon ingestion the toxicity in animals has been 200 times less than via IV. In the table below, there are listed some LD_{50} values for partially pure palytoxin obtained from different Palythoa. These values represent the amount of palytoxin required to kill half of the test animals. Values are in micrograms (μg) per kilogram of the animal's weight and have been measured 24 hours after the initial exposure.

LD_{50} values for palytoxin
Exposure	Animal	LD_{50} (μg/kg)
Intravenous	Mouse	0.045
Intravenous	Rat	0.089
Intratracheal	Rat	0.36
Intraperitoneal	Mouse	0.295
Intraperitoneal	Rat	0.63
Oral	Mouse	510 or 767

An early toxicological characterization classified palytoxin as "relatively non-toxic" after intragastric administration to rats. The lethal dose (LD_{50}) was greater than 40 μg/kg. The LD_{50} after parenteral administration was lower than 1 μg/kg. However the doubtful purity of this study increased because of uncertainty concerning the toxicological data. In 1974, the structure of palytoxin was not completely elucidated and the molecular weight was a lot higher (3300 Da instead of 2681 Da). A 2004 study discovered an LD_{50} of 510 μg/kg after intragastric administration in mice, but histological or biochemical information was missing. (Rhodes and Munday, 2004) Furthermore, palytoxin was not lethal to mice given an oral dose of 200 μg/kg. It was also found that palytoxin is very toxic after intraperitoneal injection. The LD_{50} in mice was less than 1 μg/kg. As toxin-producing organisms spread to temperate climates and palytoxin-contaminated shellfish were discovered in the Mediterranean Sea a study was done to better define the toxic effects of palytoxin after oral exposure in mice. Palytoxin was lethal from 600 μg/kg doses. The number of deaths were dose-dependent and the LD_{50} calculated to be 767 μg/kg. This is comparable to the LD_{50} of 510 μg/kg referred by Munday (2008). The toxicity was not different if the mice had some food in their stomach. The oral toxicity is several times lower than the intraperitoneal toxicity. One of the possible causes of this behavior is that palytoxin is a very big hydrophilic molecule and therefore the absorption could be less efficient through the gastrointestinal tract than through the peritoneum. A recent study by Fernandez et al. further investigated on this issue using an in vitro model of intestinal permeability with differentiated monolayers of human colonic Caco-2 cells, confirming that palytoxin was unable to cross the intestinal barrier significantly, despite the damage the toxin exerted on cells and on the integrity of the monolayer. The same study also revealed that palytoxin does not affect tight-junctions on such cells. Palytoxin is most toxic after intravenous injection. The LD_{50} in mice is 0.045 μg/kg and in rats 0.089 μg/kg. In other mammals (rabbits, dogs, monkeys and guinea pigs) the LD_{50} is ranged between 0.025 and 0.45 μg/kg. They all died in several minutes from heart failure. The lethal dose for mice by the intratracheal route is above 2 μg/kg in 2 hours. Palytoxin is also very toxic after intramuscular or subcutaneous injection. No toxicity is found after intrarectal administration. Palytoxin is not lethal when topically applied to skin or eyes. Palytoxin can travel in water vapor and cause poisoning by inhalation.

In this context, despite an increase in reports of palytoxin contaminated seafood in temperate waters (i.e., Mediterranean Sea), there are no validated and accepted protocols for the detection and quantification of this class of biomolecules. However, in recent years, many methodologies have been described with particular attention on the development of new techniques for the ultrasensitive detection of palytoxin in real matrix such as mussels and microalgae (based on LC-MS-MS or immunoassay).

== Symptoms ==
The symptoms of palytoxin poisoning and how quickly they appear depend partially on how much and through what route one has been exposed, e.g. if the poison has been inhaled or if the exposure has happened via skin.

In some non-lethal cases the symptoms in people have appeared in 6–8 hours after inhalation or skin exposure, and have lasted for 1–2 days. In different animals the symptoms have appeared in 30–60 minutes after intravenous injection and after 4 hours of eye-exposure.

The most common complication of severe palytoxin poisoning is rhabdomyolysis. This involves skeletal muscle breakdown and the leakage of intracellular contents into the blood. Other symptoms in humans are bitter/metallic taste, abdominal cramps, nausea, vomiting, diarrhea, mild to acute lethargy, tingling, slow heart rate, kidney failure, impairment of sensation, muscle spasms, tremor myalgia, cyanosis, and respiratory distress. In lethal cases palytoxin usually causes death by cardiac arrest via myocardial injury.

Exposure to aerosols of palytoxin analogue ovatoxin-a have resulted mainly in respiratory illness. Other symptoms caused by these aerosols included fever associated with serious respiratory disturbances, such as bronchoconstriction, mild dyspnea, and wheezes, while conjunctivitis was observed in some cases.

Clupeotoxism, poisoning after consuming clupeoid fish, is also suggested to be caused by palytoxin. Neurological and gastrointestinal disturbances are associated with clupeotoxism. Haff disease might be related to palytoxin and is characterized by rhabdomyolysis and gastrointestinal problems. In addition to ciguatoxins, palytoxin could also be a causative agent of ciguatera seafood poisoning.

== Treatment ==
There is no antidote for palytoxin. Only the symptoms can be alleviated.

Animal studies have shown that vasodilators, such as papaverine and isosorbide dinitrate, can be used as antidotes. The animal experiments only showed benefit if the antidotes were injected into the heart immediately following exposure.

== Poisoning incidents ==
=== Ingestion ===
There have been cases where people died after eating foods containing palytoxin or poisons similar to it (possibly ciguatoxins). In the Philippines people died after eating Demania crabs. After eating bluestripe herring some people died in Madagascar. People who had eaten smoked mackerel and parrotfish experienced near fatal poisoning in Hawaii and Japan respectively.

=== Skin contact ===
There have been palytoxin poisonings through skin absorption e.g. in people who handled Palythoa corals without gloves in their home aquariums in Germany and the US.

=== Inhalation ===
Cases of inhalation are also known. A man inhaled palytoxin when he tried to kill a Palythoa in his aquarium with boiling water. In 2018, six people from Steventon, Oxfordshire, England were hospitalized after probable exposure by inhalation to "palytoxins" which were released by coral that was being removed from a personal aquarium. Four firefighters, who responded to the incident, were also hospitalized. The patients presented "flu-like symptoms" and eye-irritation. Also in 2018, a woman in Cedar Park, Texas was poisoned when she scraped growing algae from Palythoa polyps in her home aquarium. Other members of the family, including children, also reportedly fell ill. The woman described intense flu-like respiratory symptoms and high fever within hours of inhalation and was hospitalized. Confused physicians initially misdiagnosed the palytoxin poisoning to viral infection. The toxin also killed most of the fish in the aquarium. Many aquatic hobbyists purchase the coral for their bright coloring unaware of the toxins present and the danger of the toxin if it is disturbed. A similar event occurred in the UK in August 2019.

=== Mass poisonings ===
A formerly unknown derivative of palytoxin, ovatoxin-a, produced as a marine aerosol by the tropical dinoflagellate Ostreopsis ovata caused hundreds of people in Genoa, Italy, to fall ill. In 2005 and 2006 blooms of these algae occurred in the Mediterranean sea. All those affected needed hospitalization. Symptoms were high fever, coughs and wheezes.

== See also ==
- Ciguatera
- Maitotoxin
- Botulinum toxin
- Tetrodotoxin
- Tetanospasmin
- Saxitoxin
- Harmful algal bloom
