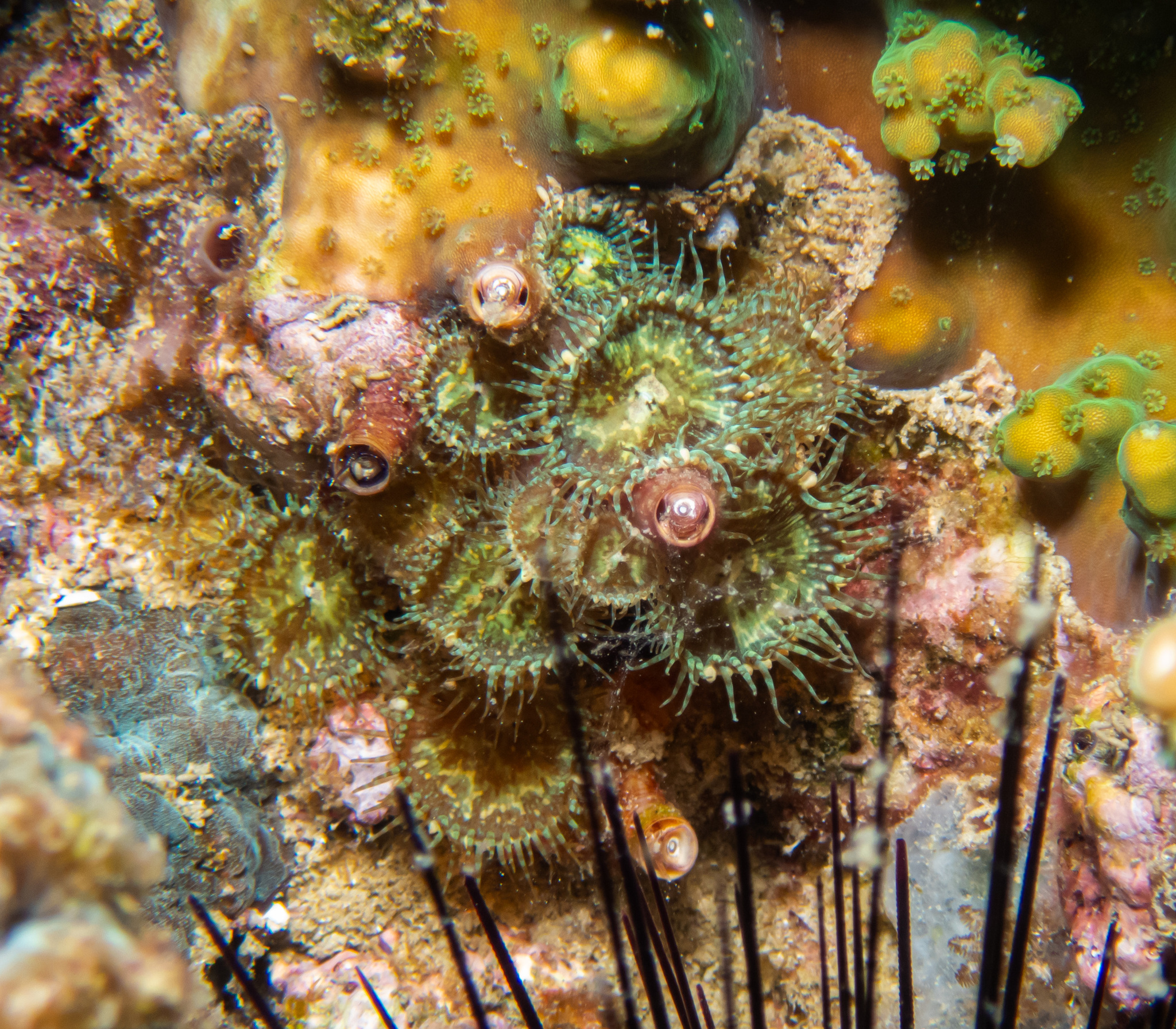

Scientific classification
- Kingdom: Animalia
- Phylum: Cnidaria
- Subphylum: Anthozoa
- Class: Hexacorallia
- Order: Zoantharia
- Family: Sphenopidae
- Genus: Palythoa
- Species: P. toxica

Binomial name
- Palythoa toxica Walsh & Bowers, 1971

= Palythoa toxica =

Species of Anthozoa

Palythoa toxica, also referred to by its Hawaiian common name, limu-make-o-Hana ('seaweed of death from Hana'), is a species of zoanthid native to Hawaii. It is notable as the species in which palytoxin was discovered and from which it was first isolated.

== Description ==
P. toxica is an encrusting species with a firm, tough cuticle. The polyps are partially embedded in a cushiony mat of coenenchyme which grows across the rock surface, and which incorporates sand grains and fragments of debris. The oral disc of each polyp is broad and has a fringe of tentacles. The polyps can close up and be retracted into the coenenchyme, which then displays a pitted surface. The colour of this species is variable but is usually some shade of cream, grey or pale brown.

== History ==
A Hawaiian legend describes how in a rock pool in the Hana district on the island of Maui there was to be found an organism known to the locals as "limu-make-o-Hana" ('seaweed of death from Hana'). The exact location of the pool was known to only a few individuals and visiting it was taboo. In 1961, intrigued by this, researchers searched for the location and discovered this zoanthid. Although advised by local people not to do so, they took some specimens away with them. On that very day, the laboratories of the Hawaiian Institute of Marine Biology on Coconut Island, Oahu were destroyed by fire. The toxic effects of this species were known to the early inhabitants of Hawaii, and the zoanthids were applied by them to the tips of their weapons, or according to one account, under severe threat, the warriors could overcome the taboo and dip their spear tips into the pool for them to become lethal.

== Distribution and habitat ==
P. toxica was first discovered in the small district of Muolea on the island of Maui in Hawaii. It was discovered in a shallow pool about 10 in (25 cm) deep which was subject to inflows of fresh water during periods of heavy rainfall, so it would appear to be a euryhaline species. The organism has since been found sporadically throughout the state.

== Palytoxin ==
P. toxica contains palytoxin, one of the most poisonous substances known. Palytoxin has been also been isolated from the related P. tuberculosa. The latter species has a seasonal cycle, varying in toxicity at different times of year, whereas P. toxica is equally toxic all year round. Other species of Palythoa have also been shown to contain the substance in varying amounts at different times and in different places, and some algae and certain crabs and fish have been found to contain it. It has been suggested that the toxin is actually produced by a dinoflagellate in the genus Ostreopsis and then incorporated into the tissues of various marine animals, possibly through biomagnification or a symbiotic relationship similar to that of zooxanthellae and stony corals.

== In aquaria ==
Palythoa toxica has occasionally been sold to keepers of reef aquariums. This practice has led to poisonings of hobbyists who have carelessly handled the organisms.
