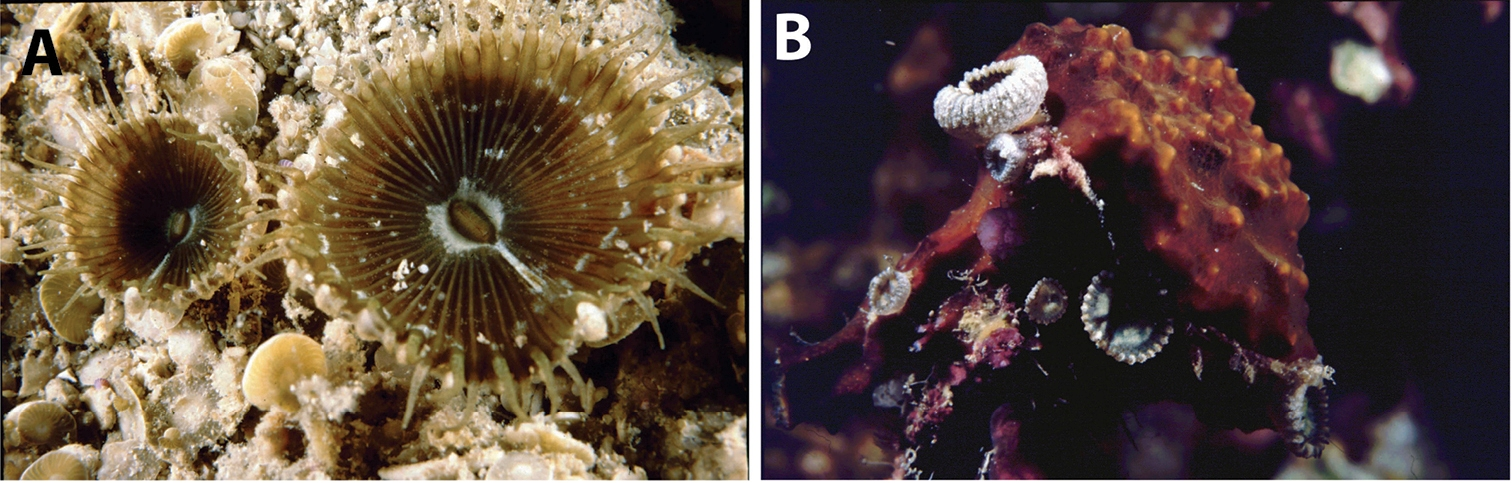

Scientific classification
- Domain: Eukaryota
- Kingdom: Animalia
- Phylum: Cnidaria
- Subphylum: Anthozoa
- Class: Hexacorallia
- Order: Zoantharia
- Family: Sphenopidae
- Genus: Palythoa
- Species: P. mutuki

Binomial name
- Palythoa mutuki (Haddon & Shackleton, 1891)

= Palythoa mutuki =

Species of coral

Palythoa mutuki is a species of zoanthid generally found in the Indo-Pacific but also common off the west coast of South America. It occurs at depths ranging between 0 - 28m, being found in both marine and intertidal zones. It was found to hold a higher diversity of associated species than Zoanthus sansibaricus, which inhabits a similar niche. Recent research has indicated that several compounds taken from the ethanolic extract of Palythoa Mutuki have shown strong anti-viral activity towards the dengue virus, which may someday contribute towards a cure for the disease.

== Gallery ==
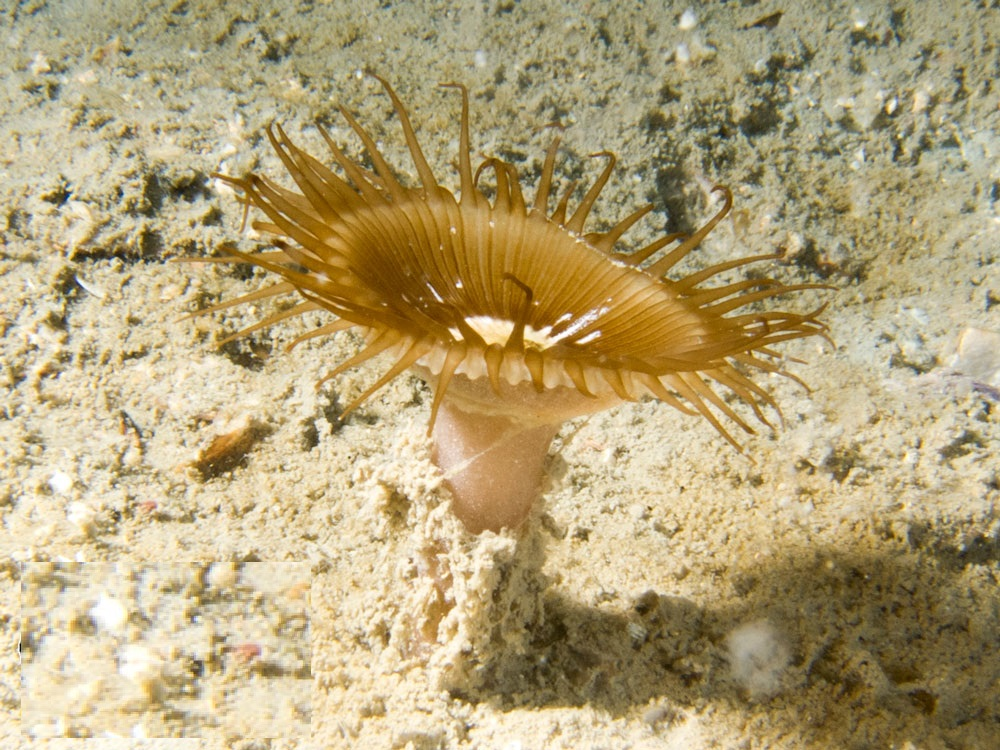
Palythoa mutuki in Thailand

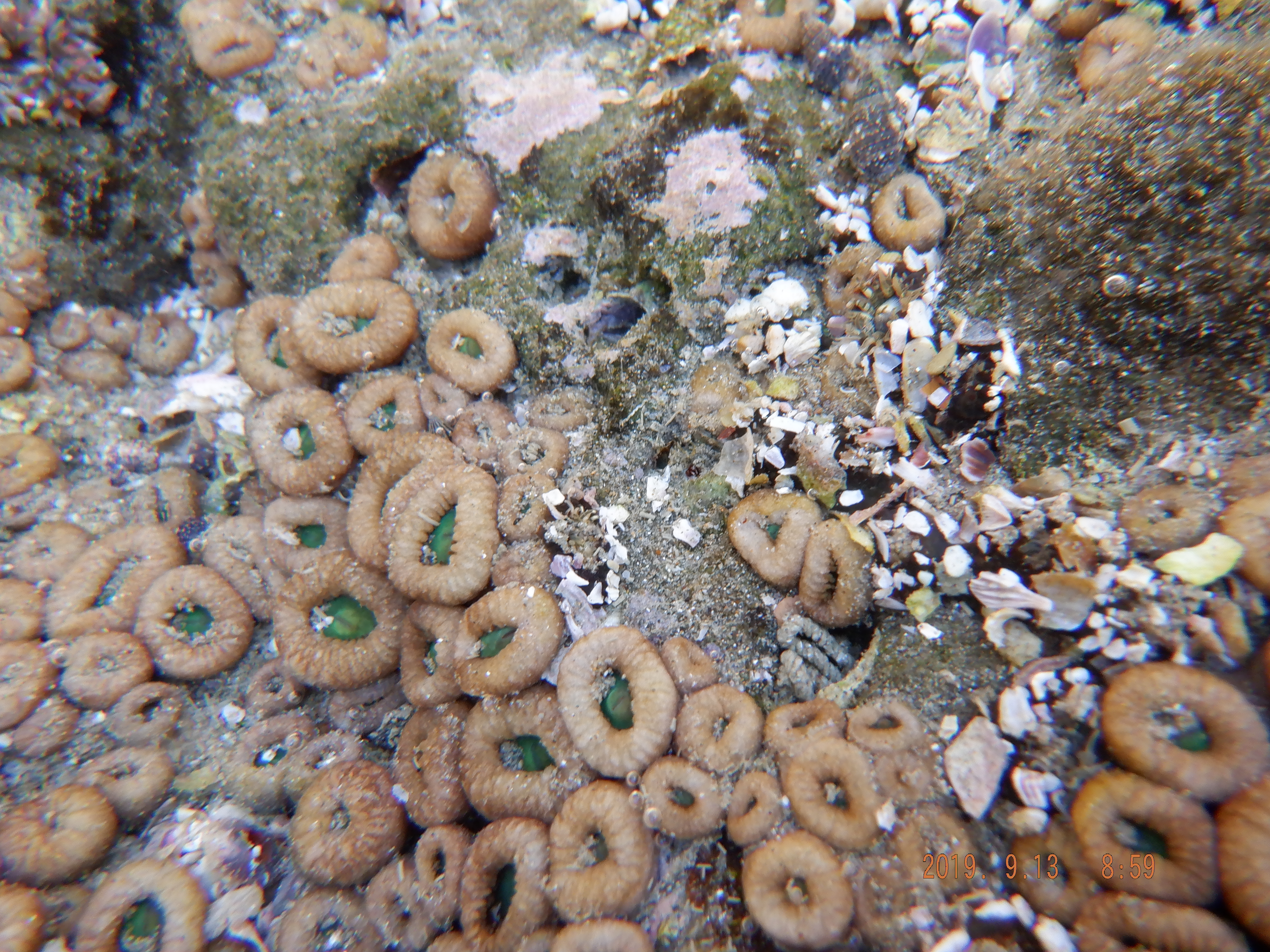
Closed Palythoa mutuki due to wave action in an Ecuadorian tidepool

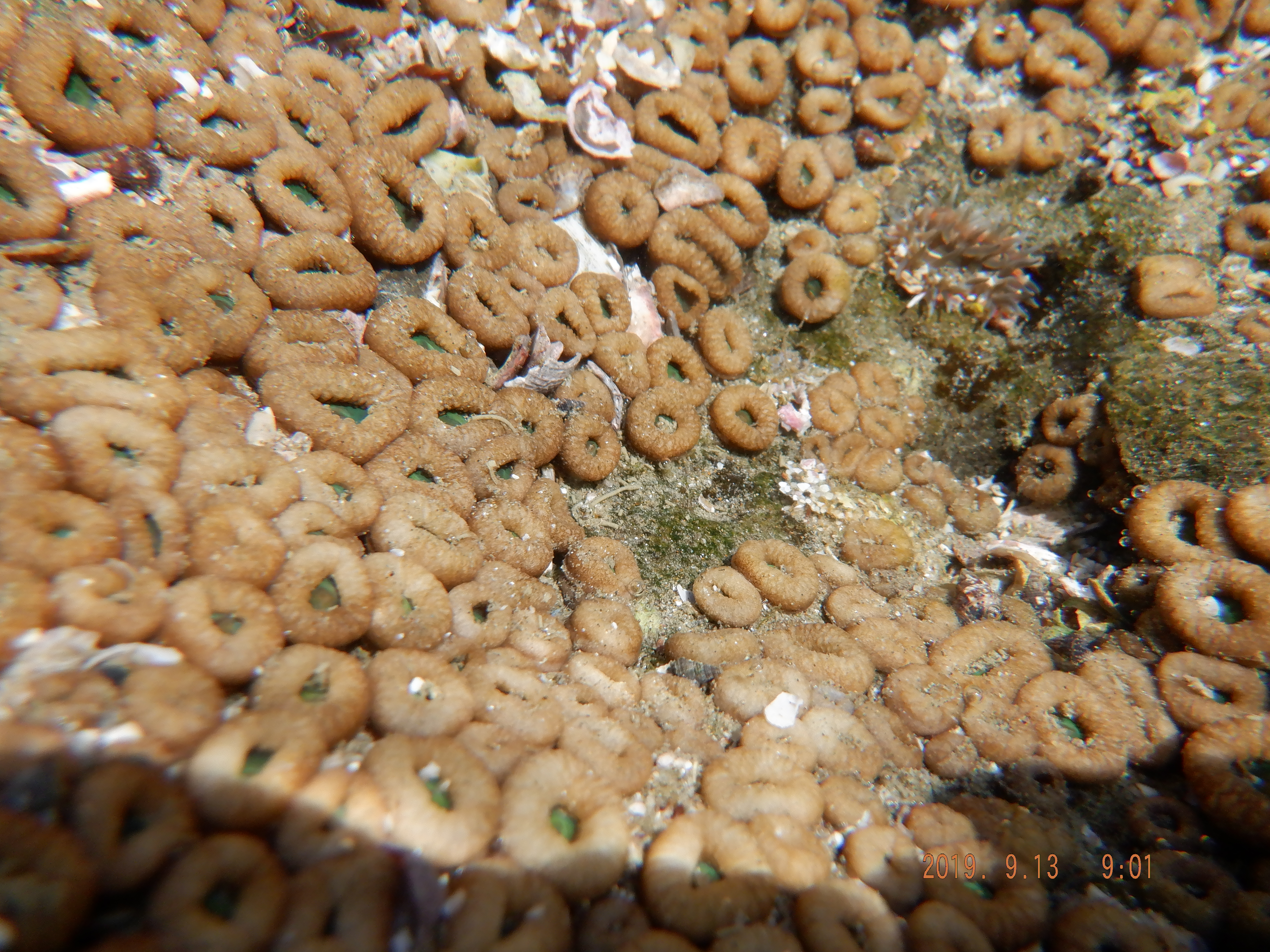
Closed Palythoa mutuki due to wave action in an Ecuadorian tidepool
