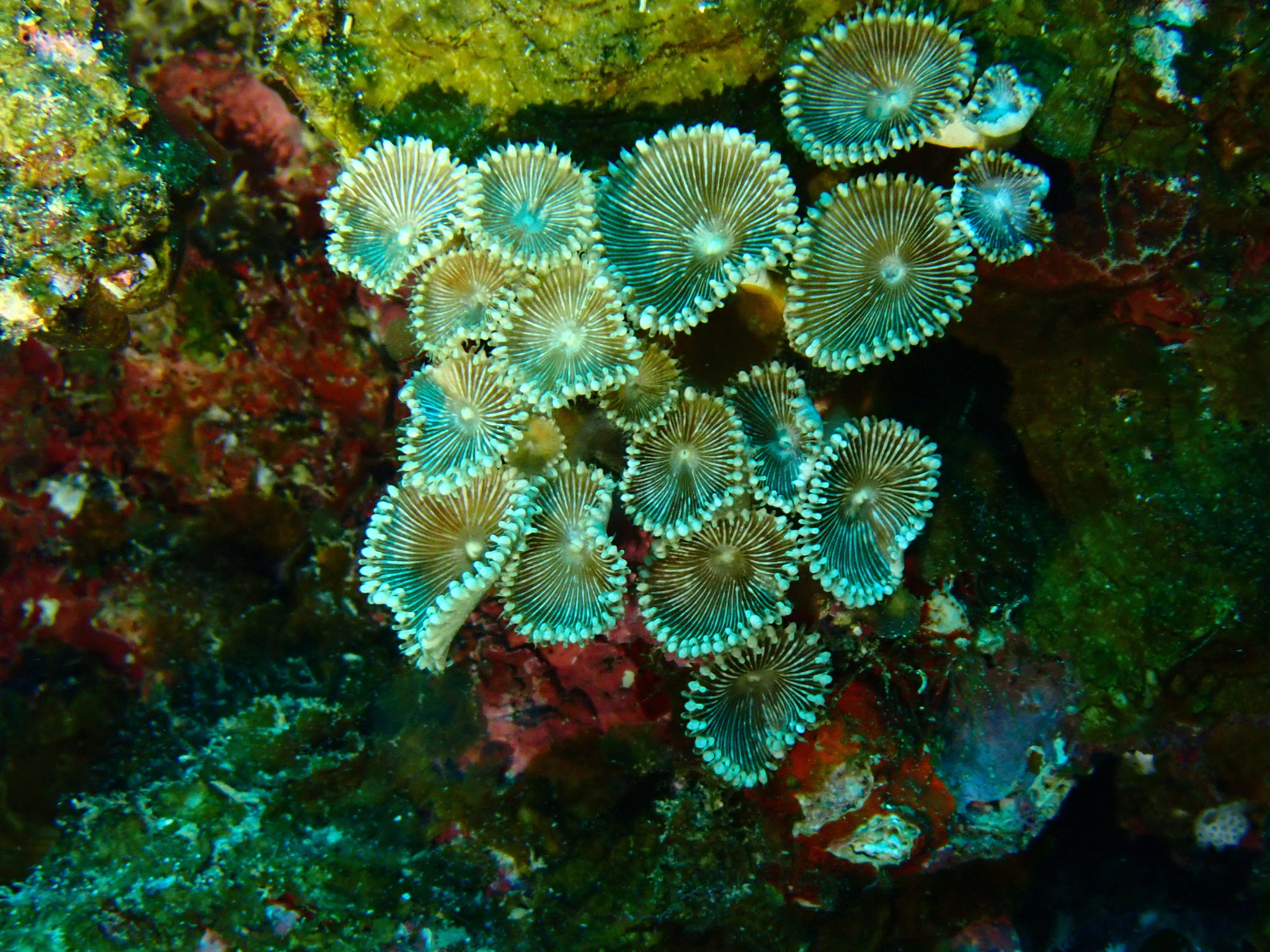

Scientific classification
- Domain: Eukaryota
- Kingdom: Animalia
- Phylum: Cnidaria
- Subphylum: Anthozoa
- Class: Hexacorallia
- Order: Zoantharia
- Family: Sphenopidae
- Genus: Palythoa
- Species: P. heliodiscus

Binomial name
- Palythoa heliodiscus (Ryland & Lancaster, 2003)

Synonyms
- Protopalythoa heliodiscus Ryland & Lancaster, 2003

= Palythoa heliodiscus =

Species of cnidarian

Palythoa heliodiscus, the sunray zoanthid, is a species of cnidarian in the family Sphenopidae.
