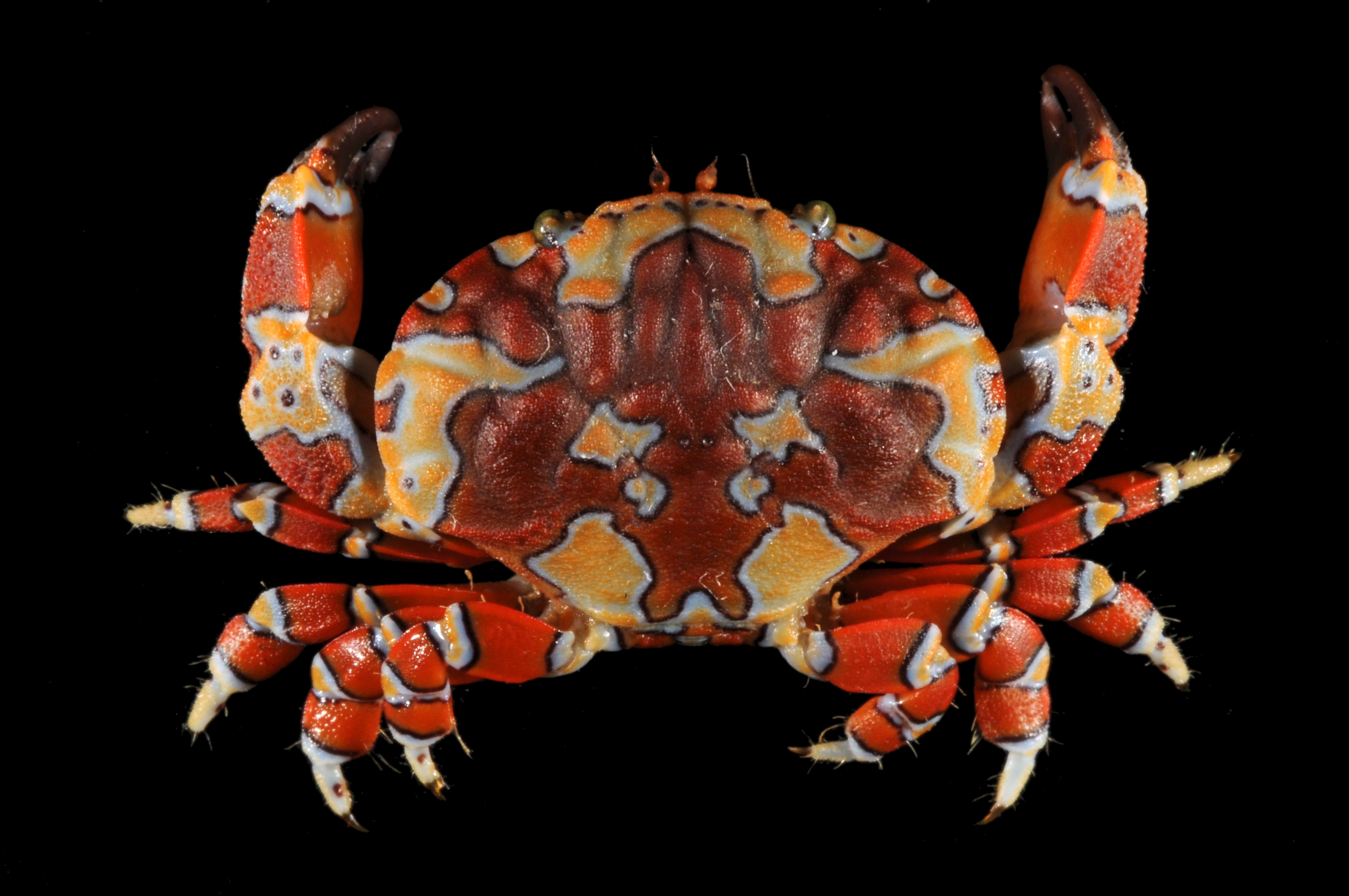
- Platypodiella spectabilis

Scientific classification
- Kingdom: Animalia
- Phylum: Arthropoda
- Class: Malacostraca
- Order: Decapoda
- Suborder: Pleocyemata
- Infraorder: Brachyura
- Family: Xanthidae
- Subfamily: Zosiminae
- Genus: Platypodiella; Guinot, 1967

Type species
- Cancer spectabilis Herbst, 1794

= Platypodiella =

Genus of crabs

Platypodiella is a genus of crabs in the family Xanthidae, containing the following species:

- Platypodiella gemmata (Rathbun, 1902)
- Platypodiella georgei den Hartog & Turkay, 1991
- Platypodiella picta (A. Milne Edwards, 1869)
- Platypodiella rotundata (Stimpson, 1860)
- Platypodiella spectabilis (Herbst, 1794)
