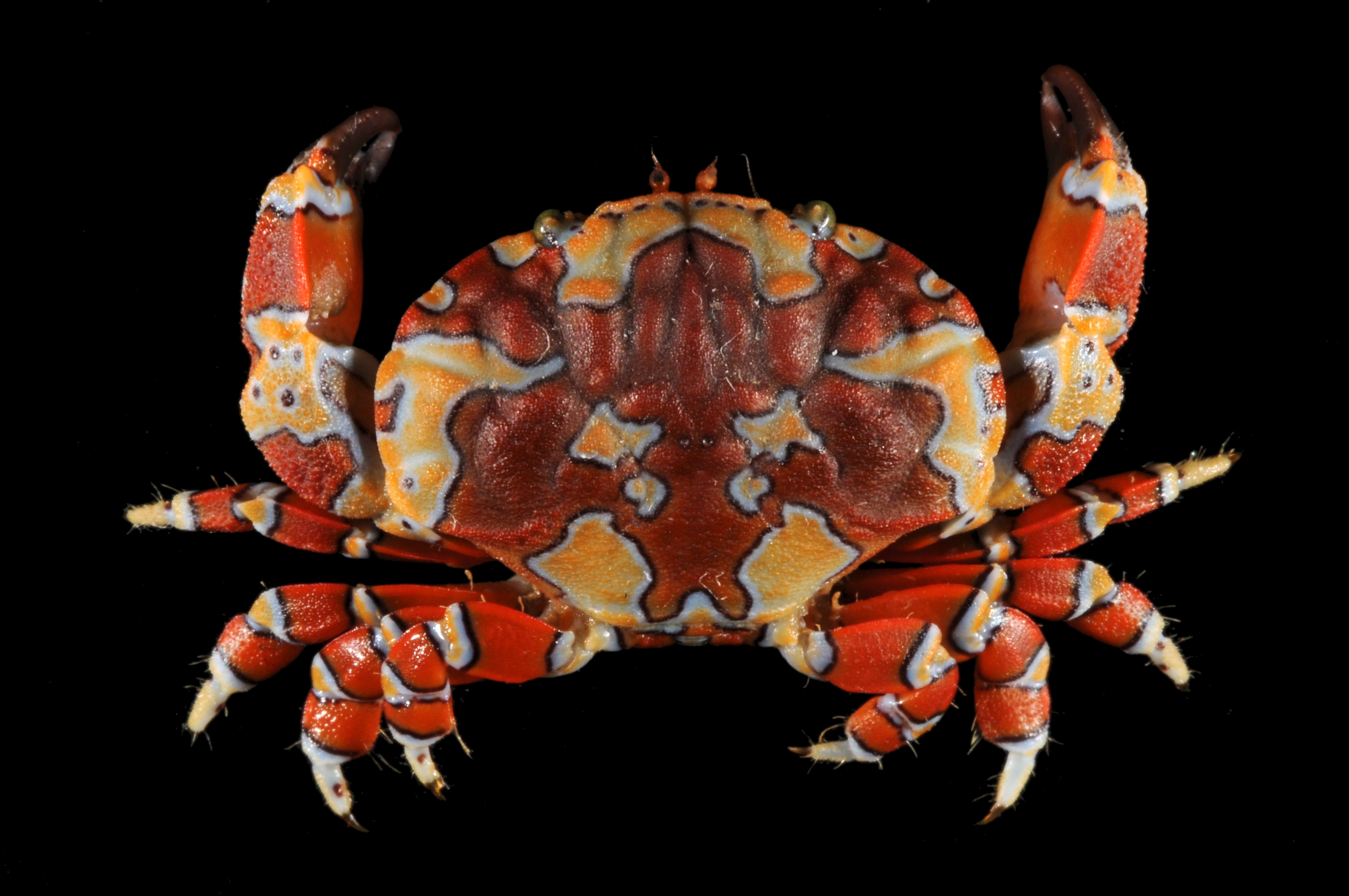

Scientific classification
- Kingdom: Animalia
- Phylum: Arthropoda
- Class: Malacostraca
- Order: Decapoda
- Suborder: Pleocyemata
- Infraorder: Brachyura
- Family: Xanthidae
- Genus: Platypodiella
- Species: P. spectabilis

Binomial name
- Platypodiella spectabilis (Herbst, 1794)

Synonyms
- Cancer lobata H. Milne Edwards, 1834; Cancer spectabilis Herbst, 1794

= Platypodiella spectabilis =

Species of crab

Platypodiella spectabilis, the gaudy clown crab, is a species of crab in the family Xanthidae.

Video of gaudy clown crab behaviour
- Gaudy Clown Crab - East End, Grand Cayman

== Habitat ==
Crabs of the genus Platypodiella are well known to live in close association with zoanthid corals, especially preferring corals of the genus Palythoa. They dig holes in the corals to live in and occupy crevasses around dead coral. Gaudy clown crabs have additionally been recorded creating similar holes in sponges, specifically Niphates digitalis at a site in Statia (Sint Eustatius) in the Lesser Antilles.
