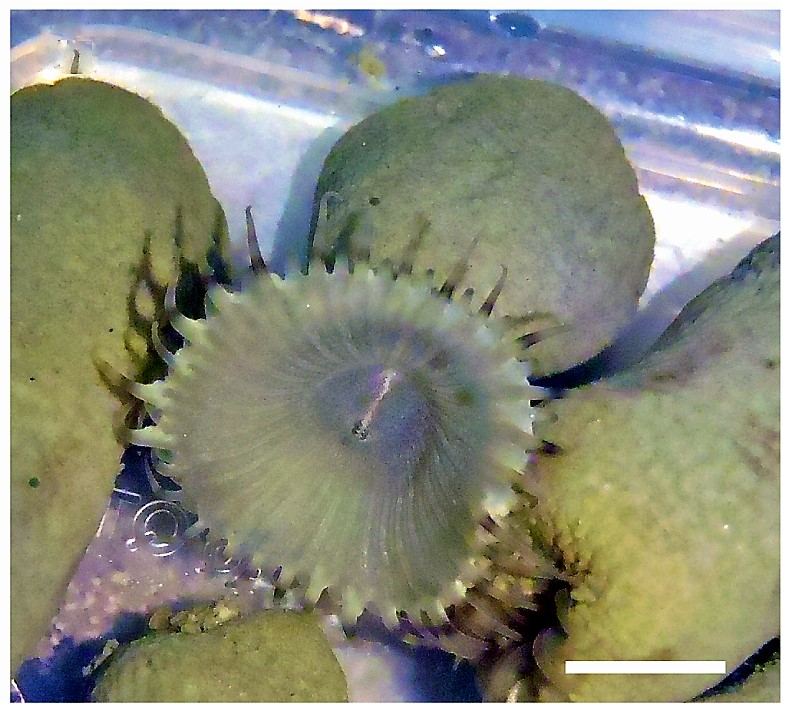
- Sphenopus marsupialis

Scientific classification
- Domain: Eukaryota
- Kingdom: Animalia
- Phylum: Cnidaria
- Subphylum: Anthozoa
- Class: Hexacorallia
- Order: Zoantharia
- Family: Sphenopidae
- Genus: Sphenopus; Steenstrup, 1856

= Sphenopus (cnidarian) =

Genus of corals

Sphenopus is a genus of zoanthids within the family Sphenopidae. There are currently 4 species assigned to the genus.

== Species ==
- Sphenopus arenaceus Hertwig, 1882
- Sphenopus exilis Fujii & Reimer, 2016
- Sphenopus marsupialis (Gmelin, 1791)
- Sphenopus pedunculatus Hertwig, 1888
