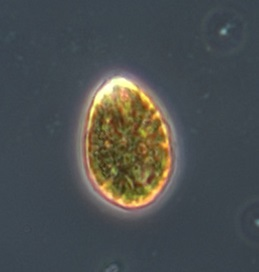
- A cell of Ostreopsis cf. ovata

Scientific classification
- Domain: Eukaryota
- Clade: Sar
- Clade: Alveolata
- Phylum: Dinoflagellata
- Class: Dinophyceae
- Order: Gonyaulacales
- Family: Ostreopsidaceae
- Genus: Ostreopsis; J.Schmidt

Species
- See text

= Ostreopsis =

Genus of single-celled organisms

Ostreopsis is a genus of free-living dinoflagellates found in marine environments. Some species are benthic; the planktonic species in the genus are known for the toxic algal blooms that they sometimes cause, threatening human and animal health.

== Taxonomy ==
The taxonomy of this genus is problematic. When in 1901, Schmidt first created the genus Ostreopsis, he described the type species O. siamensis from the phytoplankton in the waters of the Gulf of Thailand. However, there were anomalies in the original drawing made by Schmidt, and O. siamensis was redescribed by Fukuyo in 1981; at the same time, Fukuyo introduced two new species, O. lenticularis and O. ovata.

== Distribution and habitat ==
Ostreopsis spp. have been found in many marine locations around the world. Despite O. siamensis having been found in the plankton, other species are generally found in benthic habitats. They are most noticeable in temperate seas when they cause algal blooms in summer, an event that has become more frequent in the early part of the twenty-first century. The only species identified in the Mediterranean Sea are O. ovata and O. siamensis. The bloom in 2006 off Sant Andreu de Llavaneres in northeastern Spain, was described as "a conspicuous, thick, brownish mucilage layer covering benthic macroalgae".

== Toxicity ==
Under certain conditions, dinoflagellates can become very numerous and cause algal blooms. These can lower the oxygen concentration of the water and can clog the gills of filter feeding organisms. Some of these dinoflagellates contain toxic chemicals which may be sequestered by animals that eat them, and can threaten public health and cause economic damage to fisheries.

Some species of Ostreopsis synthesize palytoxin, one of the most toxic, non-protein substances known. Palytoxin was first isolated from the zoanthid Palythoa toxica and proved to be an unusually long chain polyether-type phycotoxin. It is now postulated that the substance is synthesized by the dinoflagellates and is subsequently incorporated into the zoanthid tissues; it may be a symbiotic arrangement, and it is possible that bacteria are involved in the transfer.

Species of Ostreopsis have been implicated in outbreaks of ill health in countries to the immediate north of the Mediterranean Sea, particularly Spain, Italy and Greece. Along the Ligurian coast of Italy, large numbers of people were affected after visiting beaches in the summer of 2005, and about 200 people sought medical help; symptoms included rhinorrhoea, fever, cough and mild breathing problems, and sometimes conjunctivitis. These symptoms have been shown to be the result of aerosols containing the dinoflagellates, which had been whipped off the surface of the water by winds, and carried ashore to the detriment of public health. In a separate incident, a mass mortality of the sea urchin Evechinus chloroticus occurred in New Zealand in 2004, associated with a bloom of O. siamensis, although in this instance there were no human casualties.

== Species ==
The World Register of Marine Species includes the following species in the genus :

- Ostreopsis belizeana M. A. Faust
- Ostreopsis caribbeana M. A. Faust
- Ostreopsis fattorussoi Accoroni, Romagnoli & Totti
- Ostreopsis heptagona D. R. Norris, J. W. Bomber & Balech
- Ostreopsis labens M. A. Faust & S. L. Morton
- Ostreopsis lenticularis Y. Fukuyo
- Ostreopsis marina M. A. Faust
- Ostreopsis mascarenensis J. P. Quod
- Ostreopsis ovata Fukuyo
- Ostreopsis rhodesiae Verma, Hoppenrath & S. A. Murray
- Ostreopsis siamensis Johs. Schmidt
