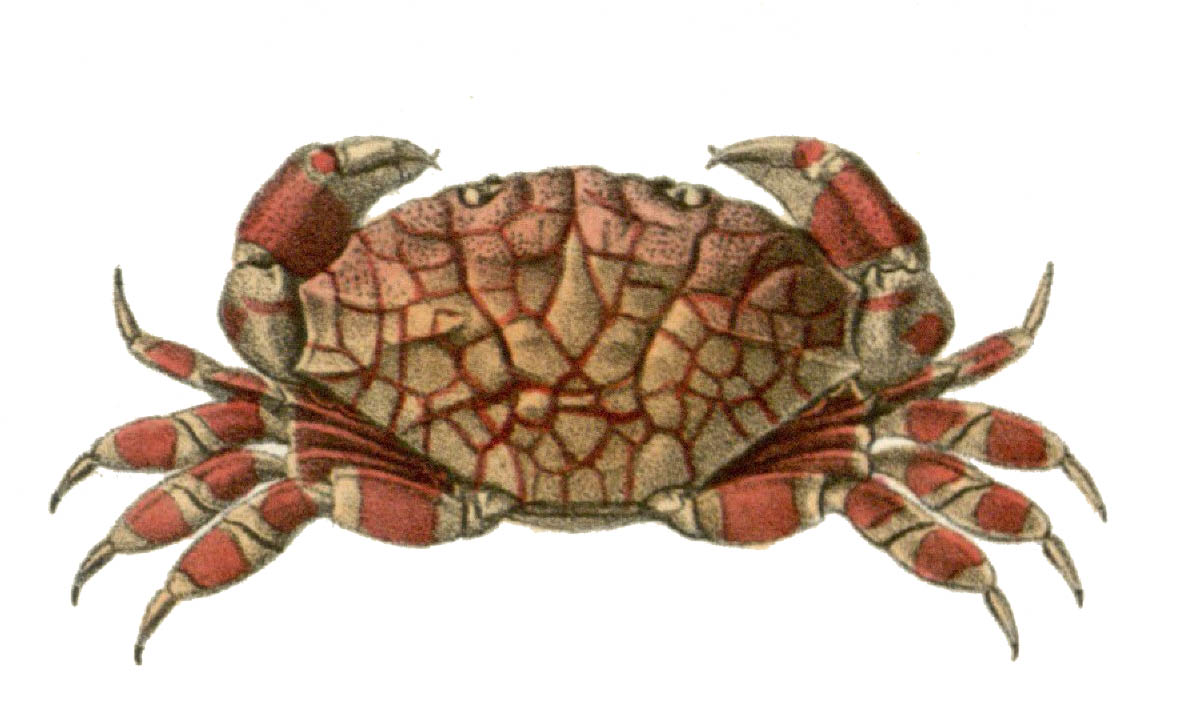

Scientific classification
- Kingdom: Animalia
- Phylum: Arthropoda
- Clade: Pancrustacea
- Class: Malacostraca
- Order: Decapoda
- Suborder: Pleocyemata
- Infraorder: Brachyura
- Family: Xanthidae
- Genus: Lophozozymus
- Species: L. pulchellus

Binomial name
- Lophozozymus pulchellus A. Milne-Edwards, 1867

= Lophozozymus pulchellus =

Species of crab

Lophozozymus pulchellus is a species of crab in the family Xanthidae.

== Description ==
The carapace contains some granular crests, and has a pattern of fine red lines. The anterior area of the dorsal surface of the carapace is somewhat granular. There is a large, transverse red band on the ambulatory legs. These legs are cylindrical in shape, the superior margin containing a fine crest.

Lophozozymus pulchellus has been known to consume exclusively palythoa and zoanthidae that have very high toxin levels.

== Distribution ==
This species is known to occur in:

- New Caledonia (type locality)
- Red Sea
- Zanzibar
- Dar es Salaam
- Europa Island
- Seychelles
- Chagos Archipelago
- Sri Lanka
- Japan: Yoron-jima, Ishigaki-jima, and Taketomi-jima, Kakeroma-jima
- Paracel Islands
- New Caledonia
- Hawaii
- Line Islands
