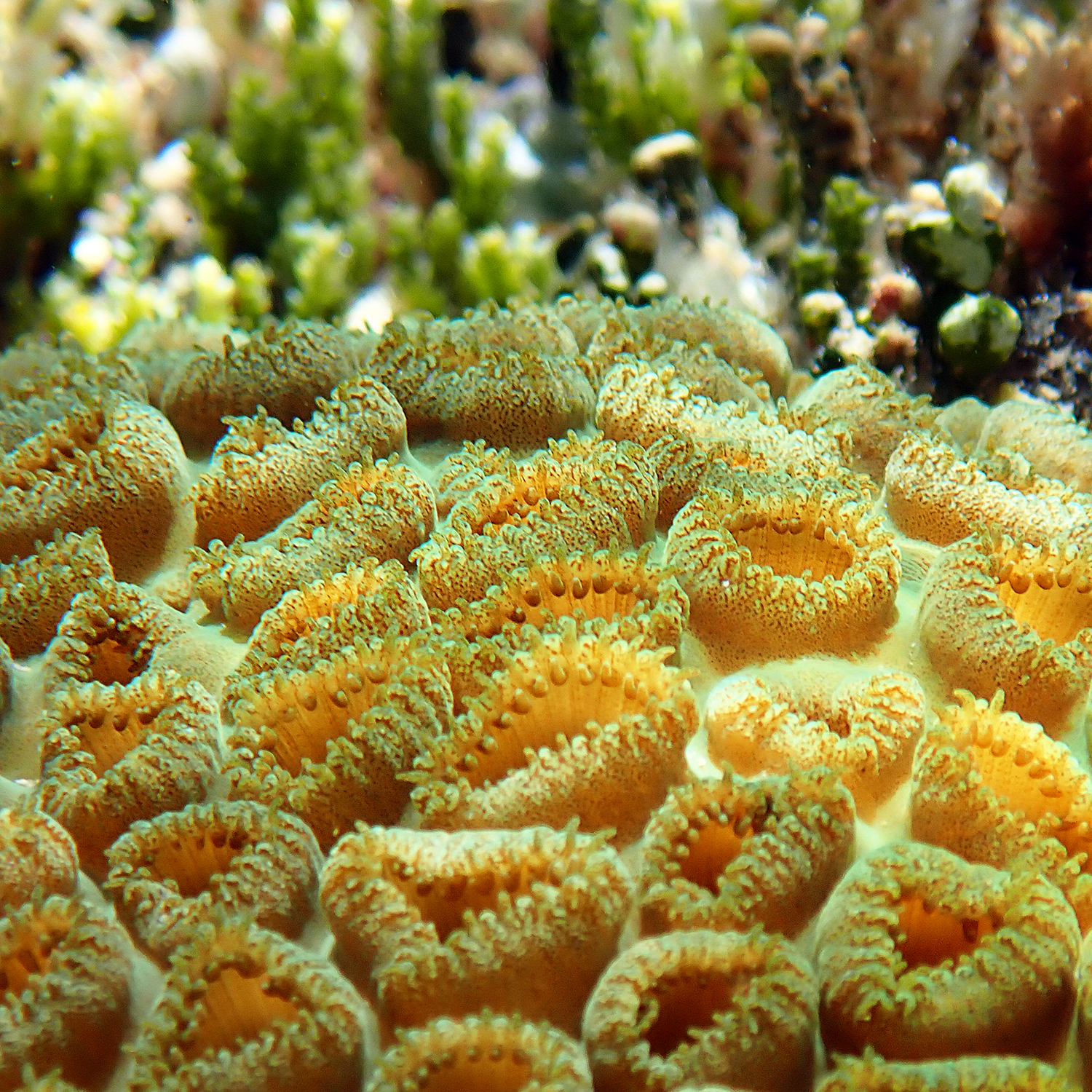
- Norfolk Island, 2023

Scientific classification
- Kingdom: Animalia
- Phylum: Cnidaria
- Subphylum: Anthozoa
- Class: Hexacorallia
- Order: Zoantharia
- Family: Sphenopidae
- Genus: Palythoa
- Species: P. tuberculosa

Binomial name
- Palythoa tuberculosa (Esper, 1805)

= Palythoa tuberculosa =

Species of coral

Palythoa tuberculosa, also known as the pillow zoanthid, or rubbery zoanthid, is a species of cnidarian in the family Sphenopidae. This species is commonly found in shallow tropical waters of the Indo-Pacific region, including Hawai'i, where it plays a role in reef ecosystems by forming encrusting colonies on rocky surfaces.

== Description ==
Like other zoanthids, Palythoa tuberculosa lacks a hard skeleton and consists of small polyps embedded in a thick, fleshy mat. The polyps are short and immersed in the surrounding tissue, with tentacles that are typically retracted during the day and extended at night. The colonies can vary in color, including shades of blue-gray, green, gray, brown, or pink.

== Distribution and habitat ==
Palythoa tuberculosa is widely distributed across the Indo-Pacific, including regions such as Hawai'i, Japan, and the Great Barrier Reef. It inhabits a range of environments, from exposed rocky coastlines with heavy wave action to sandy reef flats where colonies become encrusted with sand. In areas with steep, sediment-free surfaces, colonies tend to grow larger and remain free of sand, while in more sheltered habitats, smaller colonies develop with sand covering their surface.

== Ecology ==
As a member of the order Zoantharia, Palythoa tuberculosa is a colonial anemone-like organism that depends on both heterotrophic and autotrophic feeding strategies. It captures planktonic prey using its tentacles, which contain specialized stinging cells called nematocysts. This organism may contain palytoxin, thus it is important to avoid eye or skin contact when observing this cnidarian. Additionally, it harbors symbiotic zooxanthellae, photosynthetic algae that provide nutrients to the host through the process of photosynthesis.

== Taxonomy and molecular studies ==
The species has been previously listed under the name Palythoa caesia. However, molecular and morphological studies have confirmed that Palythoa caesia and Palythoa tuberculosa are conspecific, meaning they belong to the same species.
