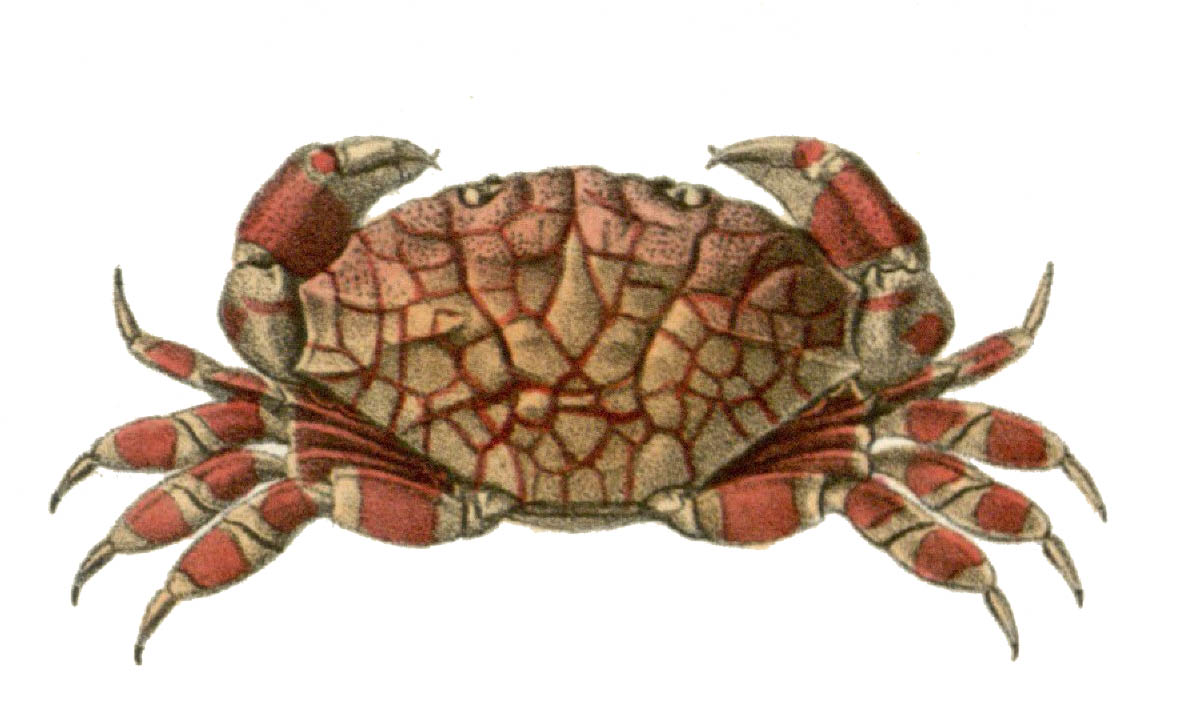
- Lophozozymus pulchellus

Scientific classification
- Domain: Eukaryota
- Kingdom: Animalia
- Phylum: Arthropoda
- Class: Malacostraca
- Order: Decapoda
- Suborder: Pleocyemata
- Infraorder: Brachyura
- Family: Xanthidae
- Subfamily: Zosiminae
- Genus: Lophozozymus; A. Milne-Edwards, 1863

= Lophozozymus =

Genus of crabs

Lophozozymus is a genus of crabs in the family Xanthidae, containing the following species:

- Lophozozymus anaglyptus (Heller, 1861)
- Lophozozymus bertonciniae Guinot & Richer de Forges, 1981
- Lophozozymus cristatus A. Milne-Edwards, 1867
- Lophozozymus dodone (Herbst, 1801)
- Lophozozymus edwardsi Odhner, 1925
- Lophozozymus erinnyes Ng & Chia, 1997
- Lophozozymus evestigatus Guinot, 1977
- Lophozozymus glaber Ortmann, 1843
- Lophozozymus guezei Guinot, 1977
- Lophozozymus incisus (H. Milne-Edwards, 1834)
- Lophozozymus pictor (Fabricius, 1798)
- Lophozozymus pulchellus A. Milne-Edwards, 1867
- Lophozozymus rathbuni Ward, 1942
- Lophozozymus simplex De Man, 1888
- Lophozozymus superbus (Dana, 1852)
