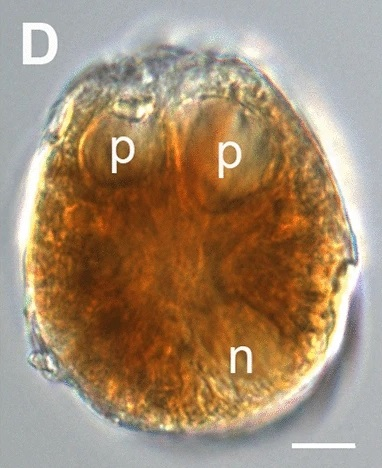
- Light micrograph of Ostreopsis lenticularis

Scientific classification
- Domain: Eukaryota
- Supergroup: Alveolata
- Division: Dinoflagellata
- Class: Dinophyceae
- Order: Gonyaulacales
- Family: Ostreopsidaceae
- Genus: Ostreopsis
- Species: O. lenticularis

Binomial name
- Ostreopsis lenticularis Y.Fukuyo

= Ostreopsis lenticularis =

Species of dinoflagellate

Ostreopsis lenticularis is a species of dinoflagellate in the family Ostreopsidaceae described in 1981 by Yasuwo Fukuyo. O. lenticularis is known to produce toxins, including ostreotoxin.

== Distribution ==
O. lenticularis was first idientified on the Gambier and Society Islands of French Polynesia and New Caledonia in the Pacific Ocean.
