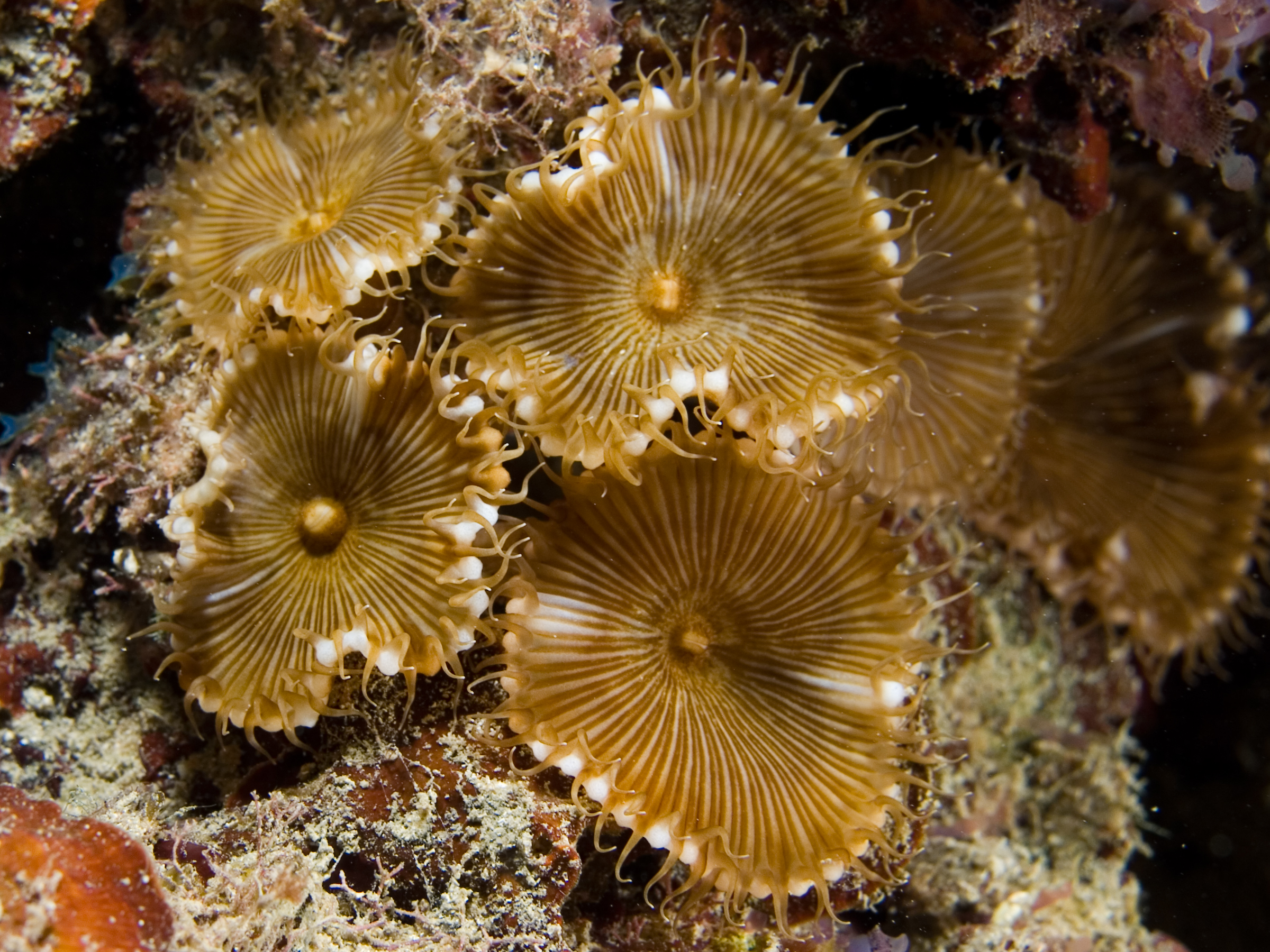
- Palythoa grandis

Scientific classification
- Kingdom: Animalia
- Phylum: Cnidaria
- Subphylum: Anthozoa
- Class: Hexacorallia
- Order: Zoantharia
- Family: Sphenopidae
- Genus: Palythoa; Lamouroux, 1816

Synonyms
- Protopalythoa Verrill, 1900

= Palythoa =

Genus of corals

Palythoa is a genus of anthozoans in the order Zoantharia.

== Description ==
The polyps of Palythoa are partially embedded in an encrusting mat of tissue (coenenchyme) covering the substrate on which the colony grows. The individual polyps have flattened oral discs surrounded by a fringe of tentacles. The tentacles' shape and size can vary considerably between species, and even between colonies of the same species. Their colors are also highly variable, with relatively dull shades like cream, coffee, white, brown, or yellow, being the most common. Bright green colonies also exist, but these are more rare.

== Palytoxin ==
Palytoxin is a highly toxic natural product found in many (but not all) members of the genus Palythoa. The substance was first isolated from the seaweed-like "limu-make-o-Hana" ("Seaweed of Death from Hana") in 1971 in Hawaii. Scientific investigation of the seaweed found it to be a colonial cnidarian, which was classified as a zoanthid and named Palythoa toxica.

The presence of this toxin is of significance to aquarists who keep reef aquariums, as Palythoa and related zoanthids are commonly kept as display specimens in marine aquaria. Aquarists have reported symptoms consistent with palytoxin poisoning prior to having exposure to zoanthids suspected to contain the toxin. One report involved an aquarist being accidentally poisoned through skin injuries after handling various zoanthids. Another report involved an aquarium hobbyist in Virginia who experienced a severe respiratory reaction after trying to eradicate colonies of a brown zoanthid (suspected to be Palythoa) from rocks in their aquarium. A 2010 study found that a single specimen of Palythoa from a sample of fifteen colonies purchased from three aquarium stores in the Washington D.C. area contained high levels of palytoxin, indicating that toxic individuals are occasionally present in the captive population.

While poisoning events have occurred, they are exceedingly rare, and many reef hobbyists have kept Palythoa without any adverse reactions.

It is generally recommended to always wear appropriate protective gloves and goggles when maintaining aquaria.

== Taxonomy and systematics ==
The genus Protopalythoa was once thought to be distinct from the genus Palythoa but is now considered to be a synonym.

=== Species ===
The following species are recognized in the genus Palythoa:

- Palythoa aggregata Lesson, 1830
- Palythoa anneae Carlgren, 1938
- Palythoa anthoplax Pax & Müller, 1957¹
- Palythoa arenacea Heller, 1868
- Palythoa argus Ehrenberg, 1834
- Palythoa aspera Pax, 1909
- Palythoa atogrisea Pax, 1924
- Palythoa australiae Carlgren, 1937¹
- Palythoa australiensis Carlgren, 1950
- Palythoa bertholeti Gray, 1867
- Palythoa brasiliensis Heider, 1899
- Palythoa braunsi Pax, 1924
- Palythoa brochi Pax, 1924
- Palythoa buitendijkl Pax, 1924
- Palythoa caesia Dana, 1846
- Palythoa calcaria Muller, 1883
- Palythoa calcigena Pax, 1924
- Palythoa calycina Pax, 1909
- Palythoa canalifera Pax, 1908
- Palythoa canariensis Haddon & Duerden, 1896
- Palythoa cancrisocia Martens, 1876
- Palythoa capensis Haddon & Duerden, 1896¹
- Palythoa caracasiana Pax, 1924
- Palythoa caribaeorum (Duchassaing & Michelotti, 1860)
- Palythoa ceresina Pax & Muller, 1956
- Palythoa chlorostoma Pax & Muller, 1956
- Palythoa cingulata Milne Edwards, 1857
- Palythoa clavata (Duchassaing, 1850)
- Palythoa complanata Carlgren, 1951¹
- Palythoa congoensis Pax, 1952
- Palythoa dartevellei Pax, 1952
- Palythoa densa Carlgren, 1954¹
- Palythoa denudata Dana, 1846
- Palythoa dura Carlgren, 1920
- Palythoa durbanensis Carlgren, 1938¹
- Palythoa dysancrita Pax & Muller, 1956
- Palythoa eremita Pax, 1920
- Palythoa fatua Schultze, 1867
- Palythoa flavoviridis Ehrenberg, 1834
- Palythoa fuliginosa Dana, 1846
- Palythoa fusca (Duerden, 1898)
- Palythoa glareola (Lesueur, 1817)
- Palythoa glutinosa Duchassaing & Michelotti, 1864
- Palythoa grandiflora (Verrill, 1900)
- Palythoa grandis (Verrill, 1900)
- Palythoa gregorii Haddon & Duerden, 1896
- Palythoa gridellii Pax & Muller, 1956
- Palythoa guangdongensis Zunan, 1998¹
- Palythoa guinensis von Koch, 1886¹
- Palythoa haddoni Carlgren, 1937¹
- Palythoa halidosis Pax, 1952
- Palythoa hartmeyeri Pax, 1910
- Palythoa heideri Carlgren, 1954¹
- Palythoa heilprini (Verrill, 1900)
- Palythoa heliodiscus (Ryland & Lancaster, 2003)
- Palythoa horstii Pax, 1924
- Palythoa howesii Haddon & Shackleton, 1891¹
- Palythoa hypopelia Pax, 1909
- Palythoa ignota Carlgren, 1951
- Palythoa incerta Carlgren, 1900
- Palythoa insignis Carlgren, 1951
- Palythoa irregularis Duchassaing & Michelotti, 1860
- Palythoa isolata Verrill, 1907
- Palythoa javanica Pax, 1924
- Palythoa kochii Haddon & Shackleton, 1891
- Palythoa leseuri Klunzinger, 1877
- Palythoa leucochiton Pax & Muller, 1956
- Palythoa liscia Haddon & Duerden, 1896
- Palythoa mammillosa (Ellis & Solander, 1786)
- Palythoa mizigama Irei, Sinniger & Reimer, 2015
- Palythoa monodi Pax & Muller, 1956
- Palythoa multisulcata Carlgren, 1900¹
- Palythoa mutuki (Haddon & Shackleton, 1891)
- Palythoa natalensis Carlgren, 1938
- Palythoa nelliae Pax, 1935
- Palythoa nigricans McMurrich, 1898
- Palythoa oorti Pax, 1924
- Palythoa psammophilia Walsh & Bowers, 1971
- Palythoa senegalensis Pax & Muller, 1956
- Palythoa senegambiensis Carter, 1882
- Palythoa shackletoni Carlgren, 1937
- Palythoa sinensis Zunan, 1998¹
- Palythoa singaporensis Pax & Müller, 1956¹
- Palythoa spongiosa Andres, 1883
- Palythoa stephensoni Carlgren, 1937¹
- Palythoa texaensis Carlgren & Hedgpeth, 1952
- Palythoa titanophila Pax & Müller, 1957¹
- Palythoa toxica Walsh & Bowers, 1971
- Palythoa tropica Carlgren, 1900
- Palythoa tuberculosa (Esper, 1791)
- Palythoa umbrosa Irei, Sinniger & Reimer, 2015
- Palythoa variabilis (Duerden, 1898)
- Palythoa vestitus (Verrill, 1928)
- Palythoa wilsmoorei Wilsmore¹
- Palythoa xishaensis Zunan, 1998¹
- Palythoa yongei Carlgren, 1937¹
- Palythoa zanzibarica Carlgren¹

¹Indicates Species Unreviewed: has not been verified by a taxonomic editor

Taxon inquirendum:

- Palythoa anduzii (Duchassaing & Michelotti, 1860)
- Palythoa auricula (Lesueur, 1817)
- Palythoa brevis Andres, 1883
- Palythoa casigneta Walsh, 1967
- Palythoa distans (Duchassaing & Michelotti, 1866)
- Palythoa dubiae Walsh, 1967
- Palythoa eupaguri Marion, 1882
- Palythoa fulva Walsh, 1967
- Palythoa fulva (Quoy & Gaimard, 1833)
- Palythoa gigantea Cubit & Williams, 1983
- Palythoa glomerata Marion, 1882
- Palythoa lutea (Quoy & Gaimard, 1833)
- Palythoa mcmurrichi (Haddon & Shackleton, 1891)
- Palythoa olivascens Brandt, 1835
- Palythoa plana (Duchassaing & Michelotti, 1860)
- Palythoa vanikorensis (Quoy & Gaimard, 1833)
- Palythoa viridifusca (Quoy & Gaimard, 1833)
- Palythoa viridis (Quoy & Gaimard, 1833)
