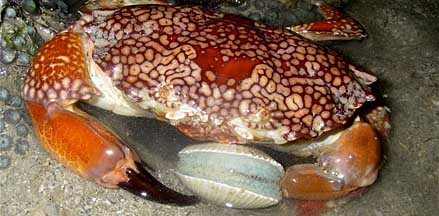
- A Lophozozymus pictor crab eating a clam

Scientific classification
- Domain: Eukaryota
- Kingdom: Animalia
- Phylum: Arthropoda
- Class: Malacostraca
- Order: Decapoda
- Suborder: Pleocyemata
- Infraorder: Brachyura
- Family: Xanthidae
- Genus: Lophozozymus
- Species: L. pictor

Binomial name
- Lophozozymus pictor (Fabricius, 1798)

= Lophozozymus pictor =

Species of crustacean

Lophozozymus pictor, the mosaic reef crab is a species of crab in the family Xanthidae.

== Description and etymology ==
The word "pictor" in Latin means painter.

Its appearance is a body of 8–10 cm (3.1–3.9 in), somewhat fan-shaped and usually red to orange with strikingly mosaic-like patterns of large white spots. Its pincers are short, both about equal size, with black tips. It has walking legs that are hairy with pointed tips.

== Distribution and ecology ==
Lophozozymus pictor is found in China, Indonesia, Japan, Philippines, Singapore, Thailand, Vietnam, Australia, and French Polynesia.

In the Philippines, this is known as Calintugas. It lives along the coral areas of Batangas, Mindoro, Sorsogon, Negros Oriental, and Samar.

== Toxicity ==
This is known to be one of the most poisonous crabs in the world. Its neurotoxin is not denatured by heat even when cooked.
