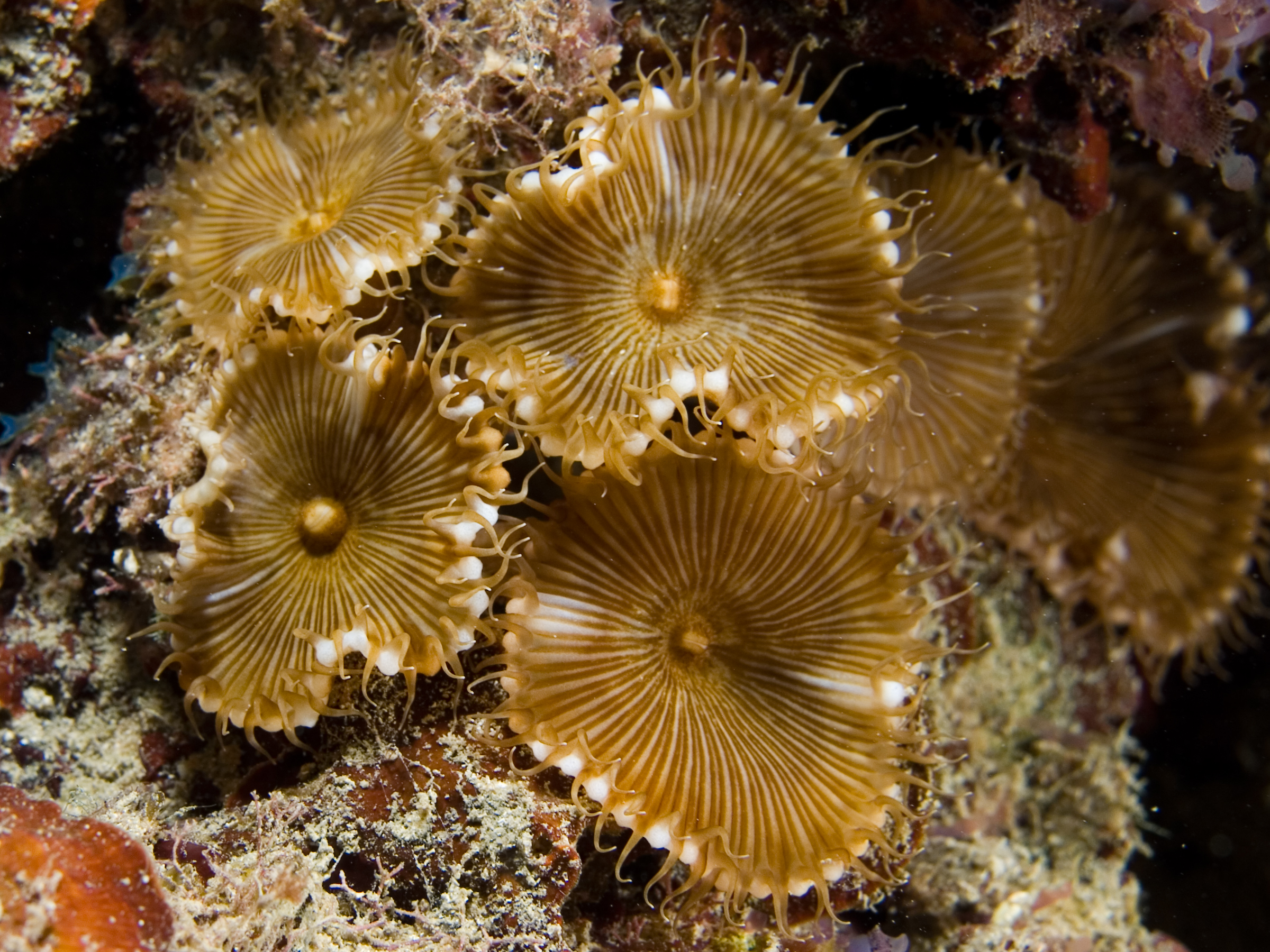
- Palythoa grandis

Scientific classification
- Kingdom: Animalia
- Phylum: Cnidaria
- Subphylum: Anthozoa
- Class: Hexacorallia
- Order: Zoantharia
- Family: Sphenopidae; Hertwig, 1882

= Sphenopidae =

Family of corals

Sphenopidae is a family of cnidarians.

Genera include:

- Palythoa Lamouroux, 1816
- Sphenopus Steenstrup, 1856
