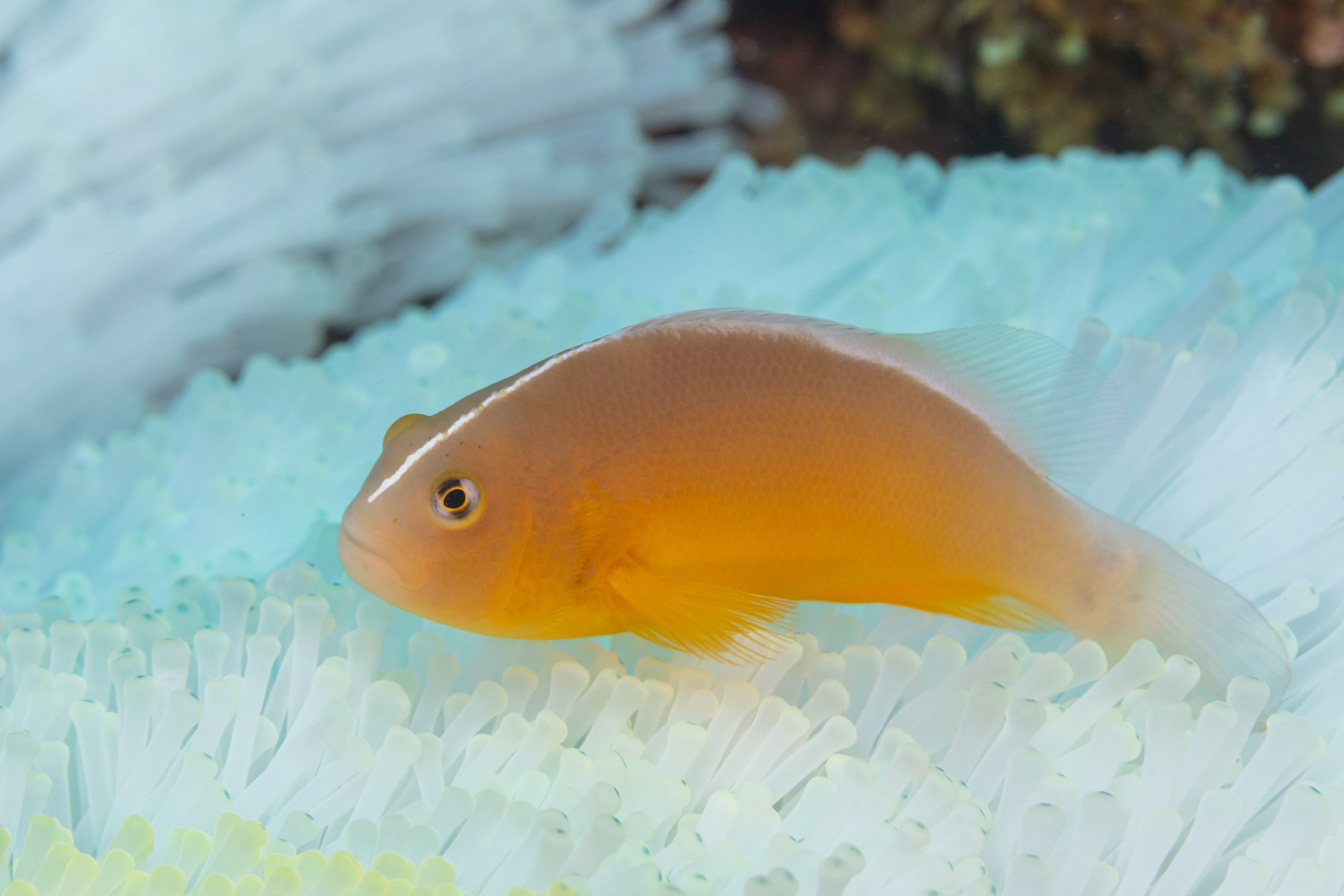

Conservation status
- Least Concern (IUCN 3.1)

Scientific classification
- Kingdom: Animalia
- Phylum: Chordata
- Class: Actinopterygii
- Order: Blenniiformes
- Family: Pomacentridae
- Genus: Amphiprion
- Species: A. akallopisos

Binomial name
- Amphiprion akallopisos (Bleeker, 1853)

Synonyms
- Amphiprion akallopisus Phalerebus akallopisos

= Amphiprion akallopisos =

Species of fish

The nosestripe clownfish or nosestripe anemonefish, skunk clownfish, Amphiprion akallopisos, is an anemonefish (also called clownfish) that lives in association with sea anemones. A. akallopisos is found in the Indian Ocean. It resides in shallow inshore reefs as deep as 15 m with a moderate to strong current. The skunk clownfish can also be kept in captivity by aquarists.

== Description ==
The skunk clownfish is identified by a light orange color, with a single, narrow, white stripe running from the mouth to the caudal peduncle, and can grow as large as 11 cm in length. Like other anemonefish, the skunk clownfish is a protandrous hermaphrodite, and maintains a hierarchy within the host anemone that consists of a mating pair, of which the female is the largest, and non-mating males which get progressively smaller in size.

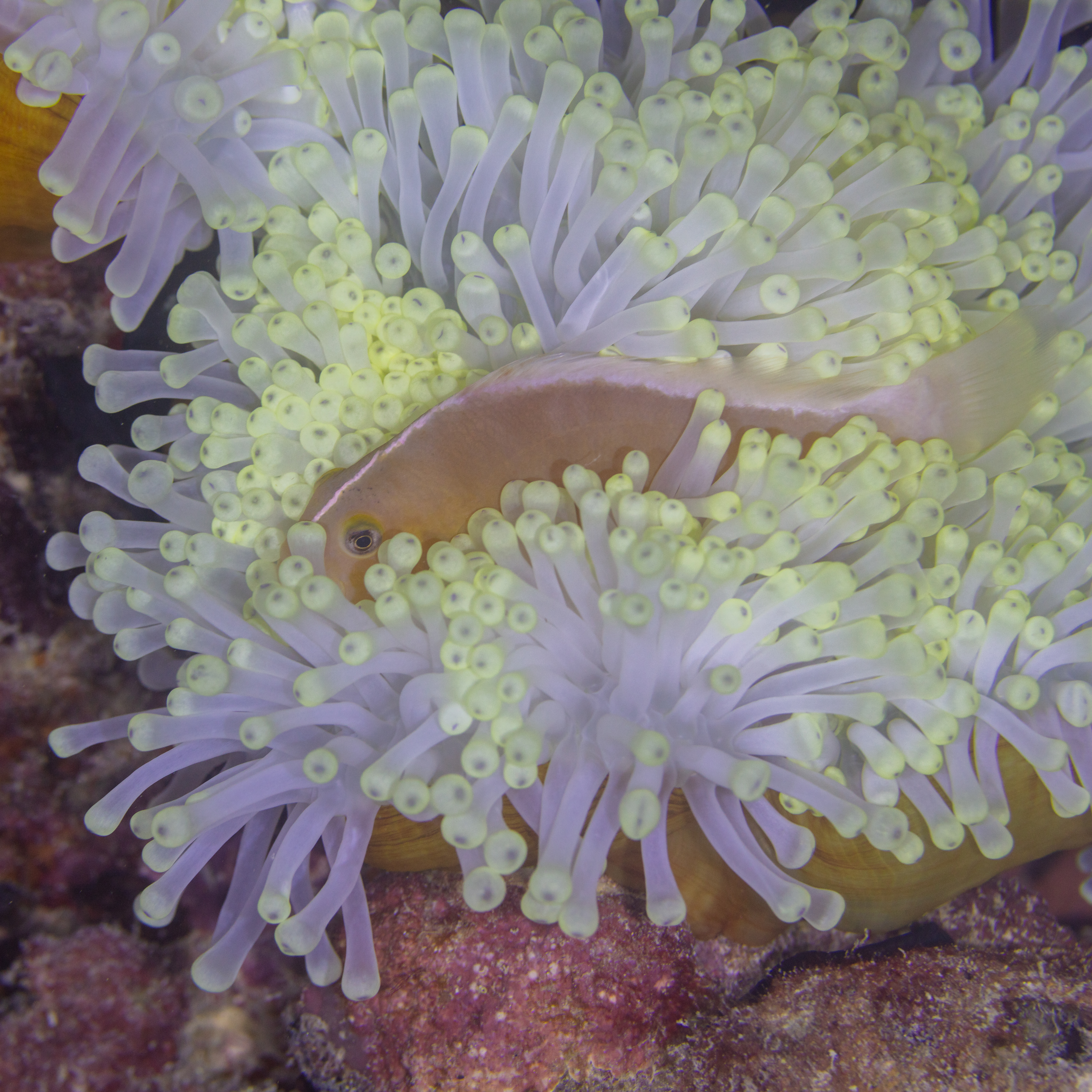
Nosestripe clownfish hiding in a Heteractis magnifica.

=== Color variations ===
A. akallopisos does not have a melanistic variation when associated with Stichodactyla mertensii unlike some other species of anemonefish, including A. chrysogaster, A. chrysopterus, A. clarkii and A. tricinctus.

== Territorial behaviors ==
The skunk clownfish, and other clownfish, use sound production to defend their territory. This behavior is most common with damselfishes that produce a wide variety of sounds, a behavior shared with at least 10 species of anemonefish. Sounds resembling pops and chirps are most commonly heard when interacting with invading fish of the same species or different species. Studies have shown that it is the female that defends the anemone using sound production, as well as a physical charge when other fishes attempt to enter. A. akallopisos exhibit three different types of sounds, pops, short chirps, and long chirps, used depending on the type and duration of the encounter, which can also vary by locality.

== Similar species ==
The mid-dorsal stripe and absence of head and body bars distinguishes A. akallopisos from most anemonefish except the orange anemonefish A. sandaracinos and they have an overlapping distribution around Java and Sumatra. The skunk anemonefish has a narrower stripe that does not reach the upper lip. A. sandaracinos, as its common name suggests, is a bright orange, while A. akallopisos is paler, tending to be more pink than orange.

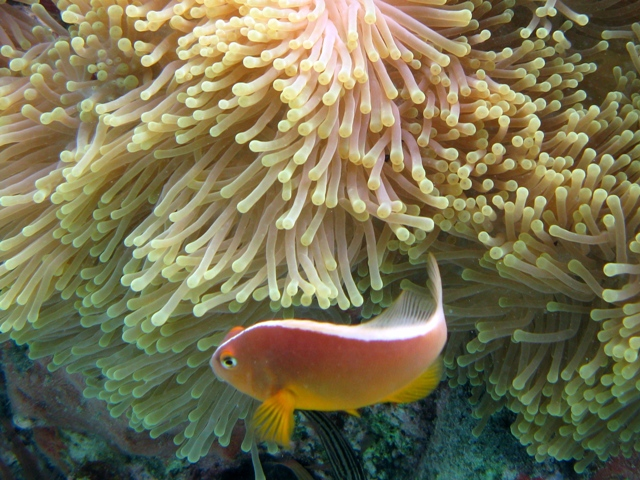
A. akallopisos (Skunk anemonefish)

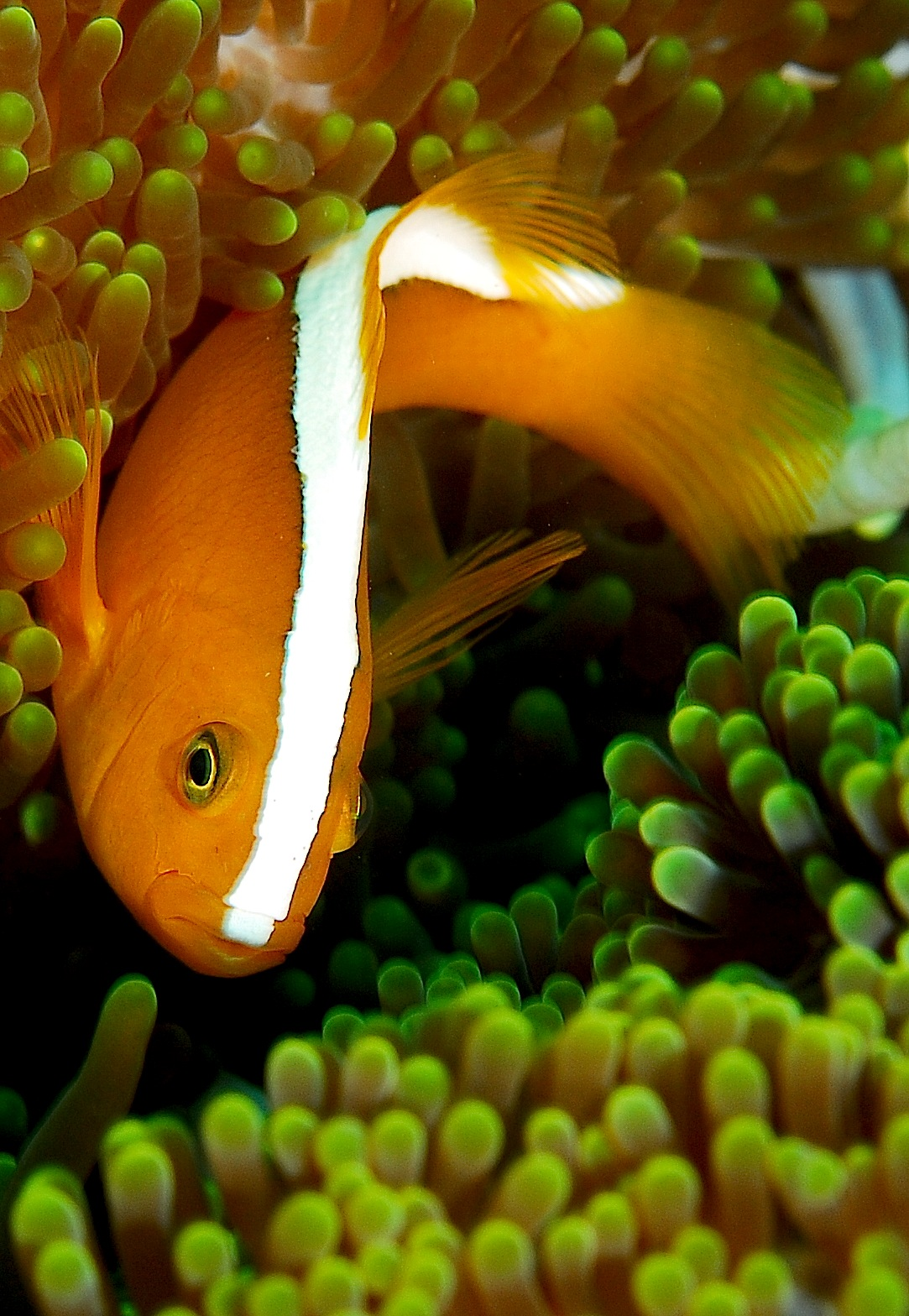
A. sandaracinos (Orange anemonefish) showing the broader white stripe extending to the upper lip.

== Distribution and habitat ==
A. akallopisos is found in the Indian Ocean from Java and the Java Sea, western and southern coasts of Sumatra, the west coast of Thailand and north to the Andaman Islands west to Madagascar, Comoro Islands and Seychelles.

=== Host anemones ===
Usually commensal with the sea anemones:

- Heteractis magnifica magnificent sea anemone
- Stichodactyla mertensii Mertens' carpet sea anemone
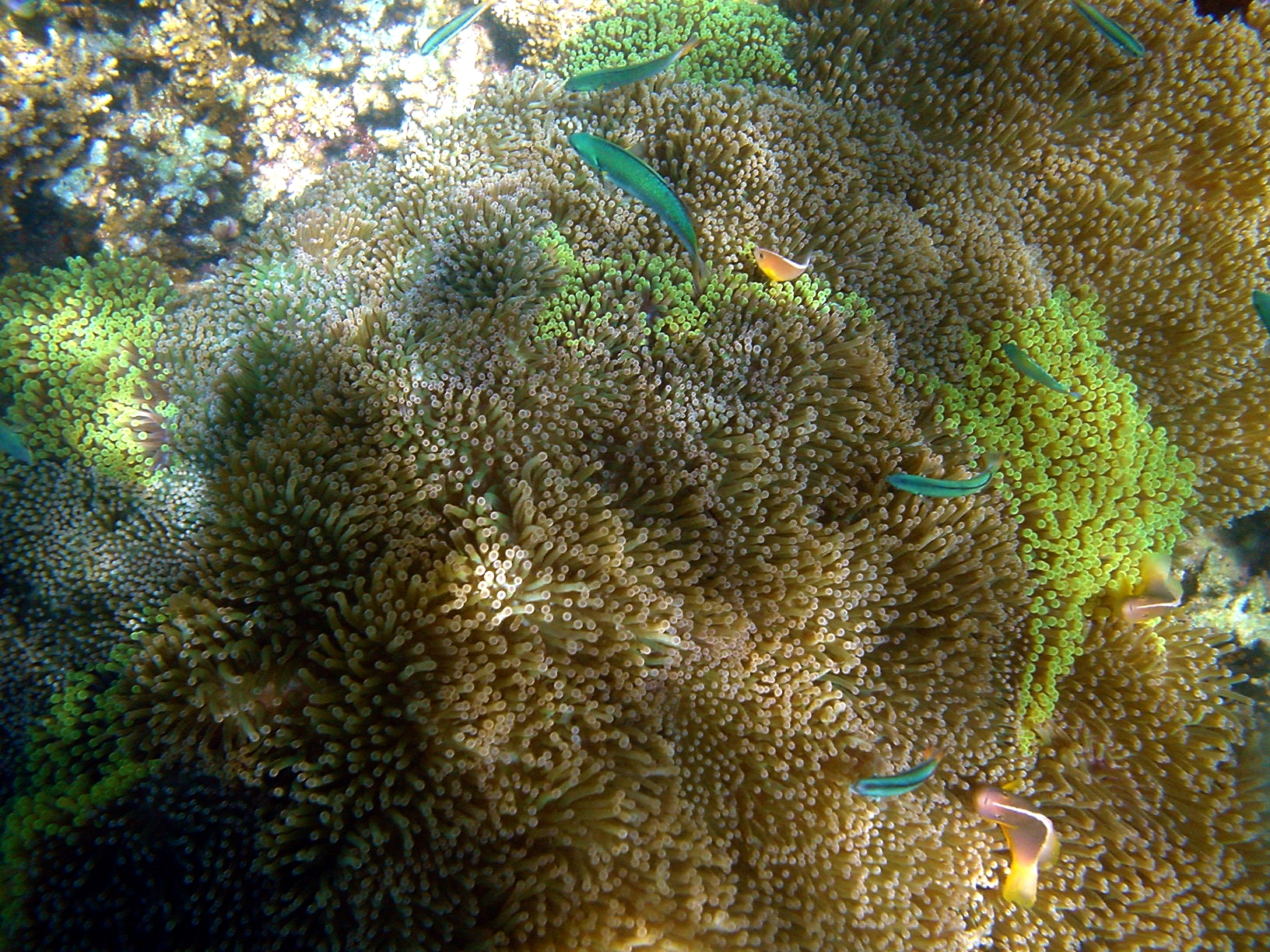
A. akallopisos with other unidentified fish in Stichodactyla mertensii.

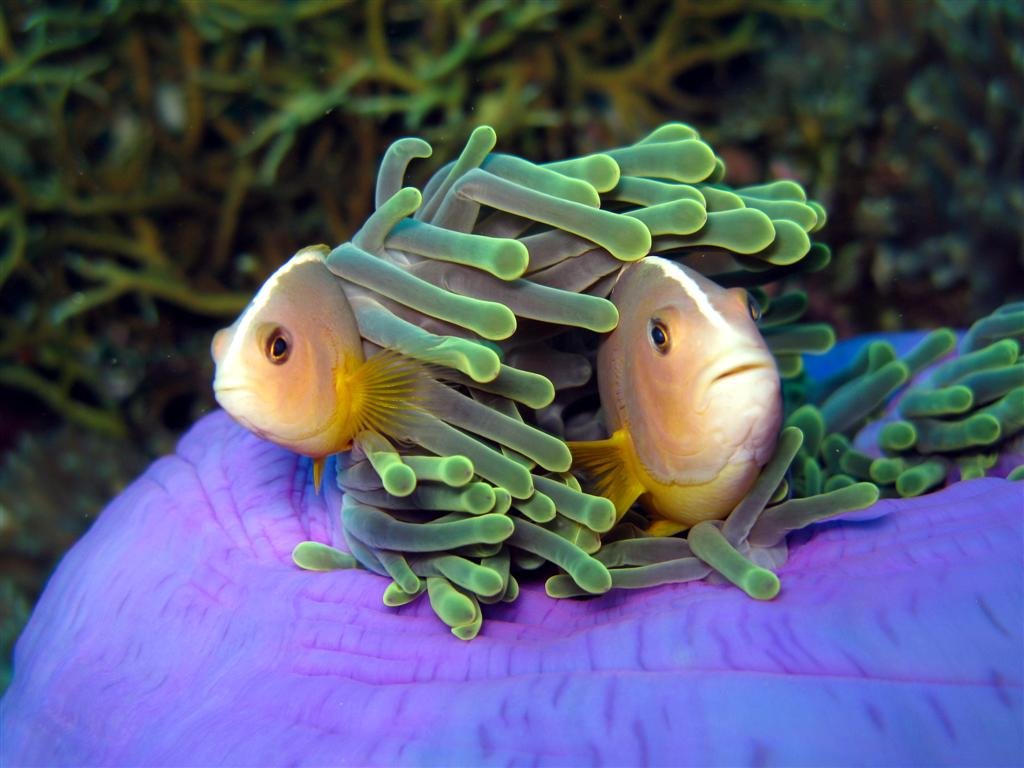
A. akallopisos in the magnificent sea anemone Heteractis magnifica.
