= Amphiprion thiellei =

Scientific classification
- Kingdom: Animalia
- Phylum: Chordata
- Class: Actinopterygii
- Division: Teleostei
- Order: Blenniiformes
- Family: Pomacentridae
- Genus: Amphiprion
- Species: A. thiellei

Binomial name
- Amphiprion thiellei Burgess, 1981

Species of fish

Amphiprion thiellei, or Thielle's anemonefish, is thought to be a naturally occurring hybrid anemonefish found in the vicinity of Cebu, Philippines. Like all anemonefishes it forms a symbiotic mutualism with sea anemones and is unaffected by the stinging tentacles of the host anemone. It is a sequential hermaphrodite with a strict dominance hierarchy.

== Description ==
A. thielli has reddish orange body, with a single white head bar that may be connected at the top with a bonnet and two saddles on the dorsal fin and tail base. They have 10-11 dorsal spines, 2 anal spines, 16 dorsal soft rays and 14 anal soft rays. They reach a maximum length of 6.5 cm (2 1/2 in). The species was described from two aquarium dealer specimens.

== Hybridisation ==
In 1992 Fautin & Allen stated that until more specimens are studied, its status as a valid species was provisional and postulated that it might represent a rare variant of another species or a hybrid. More than 30 years after A. thielli was originally described, its scientific status does not appear to have been clarified, although the scientific consensus appears to be that it likely to be a naturally occurring hybrid. One theory is that it is a cross between A. chrysopterus and A. sandaracinos. A second theory is that it is a cross between A. ocellaris and A. sandaracinos. Some support for the latter theory comes from the observations that two thiellei have never been seen as a pair in the wild, and it often pairs with A. ocellaris in the wild.

In any group of anemonefish, there is a strict sized based dominance hierarchy: the female is largest, the breeding male is second largest, and the male non-breeders get progressively smaller as the hierarchy descends. They exhibit protandry, meaning the breeding male will change to female if the sole breeding female dies, with the largest non-breeder becomes the breeding male.

This strict sized based dominance hierarchy makes the relative size of the parent species critical in shaping the outcome of hybridization In this regard A. chrysopterus is one of the largest anemonefish, growing to 17 cm in length. while A. sandaracinos is significantly smaller growing up to 11 cm as a female and just 3 to 6.5 cm as a male. A.. ocellaris is similarly small.

Constraints upon hybridization are overlap in distribution, depth and host anemone. Each of the three proposed parents have a common host anemone in Stichodactyla mertensii. There is some doubt as to the distribution of A. chrysopterus with Fautin & Allen including the Philippines and Gainsford et al. excluding the Philippines. The distribution of A. sandaracinos and A. ocellaris largely overlap from northern Australia through the central Malay Archipelago to the Philippines. If they are the parents, is A. thiellei to be found throughout the overlapping distribution, and if not, why not?

Possible parent species

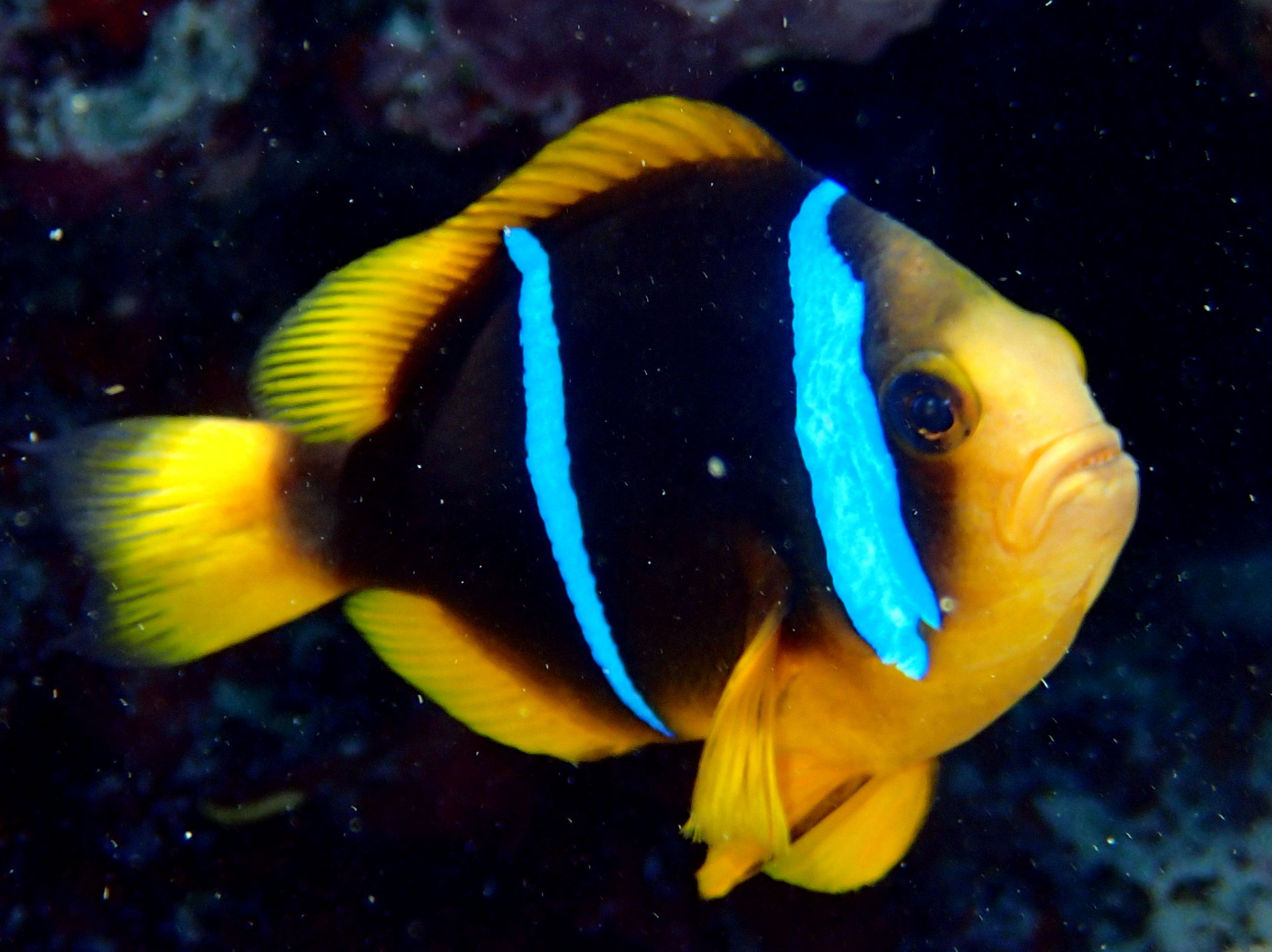
A. chrysopterus

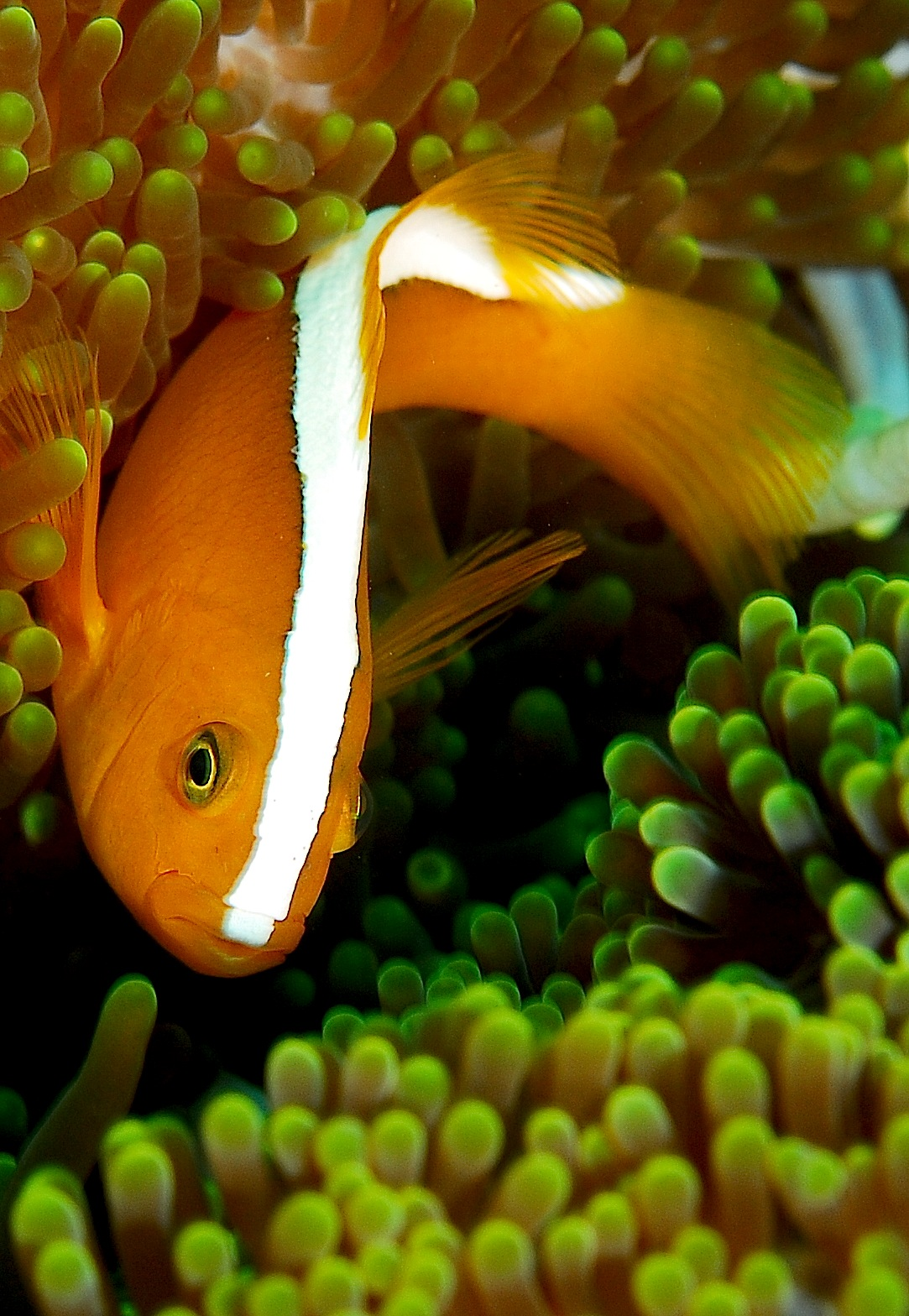
A. sandaracinos

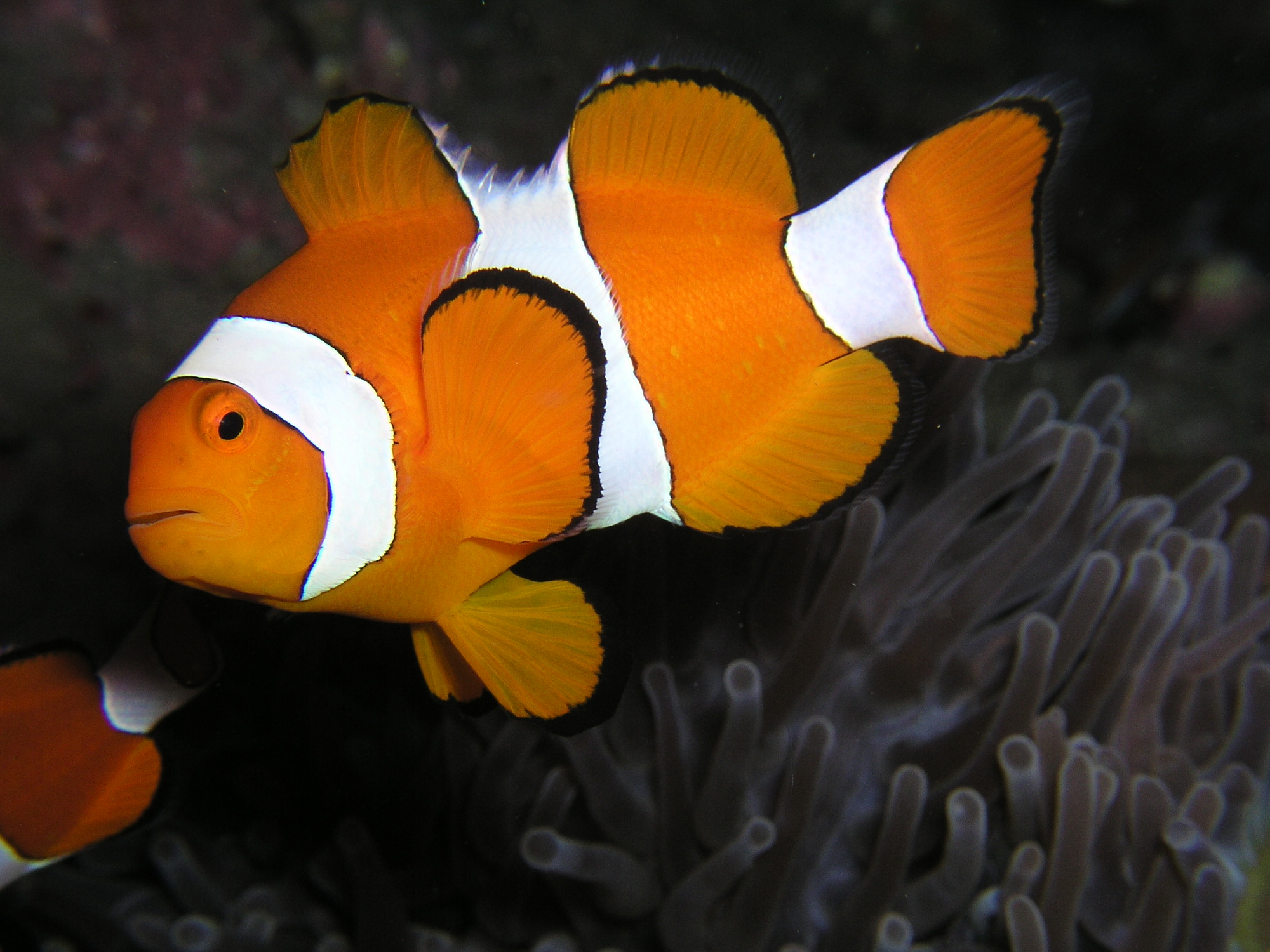
A. ocellaris

=== Color variations ===
If A. thiellei is a hybrid, it may show a variety of intermediate colors and patterns similar to A. leucokranosis. Some species of anemonefish, such as A. clarkii show melanism when hosted by S. mertensii however the small number of observations of A. thiellei make no reference to any such melanism.

=== Similar species ===
A. perideraion has a pinkish body and a continuous white stripe along the base of the dorsal fin, rather than broken into a bonnet and two saddles. A. nigripes is distinguished by its black belly, pelvic fins and anal fin and the absence of the saddles on the dorsal fin and tail base.

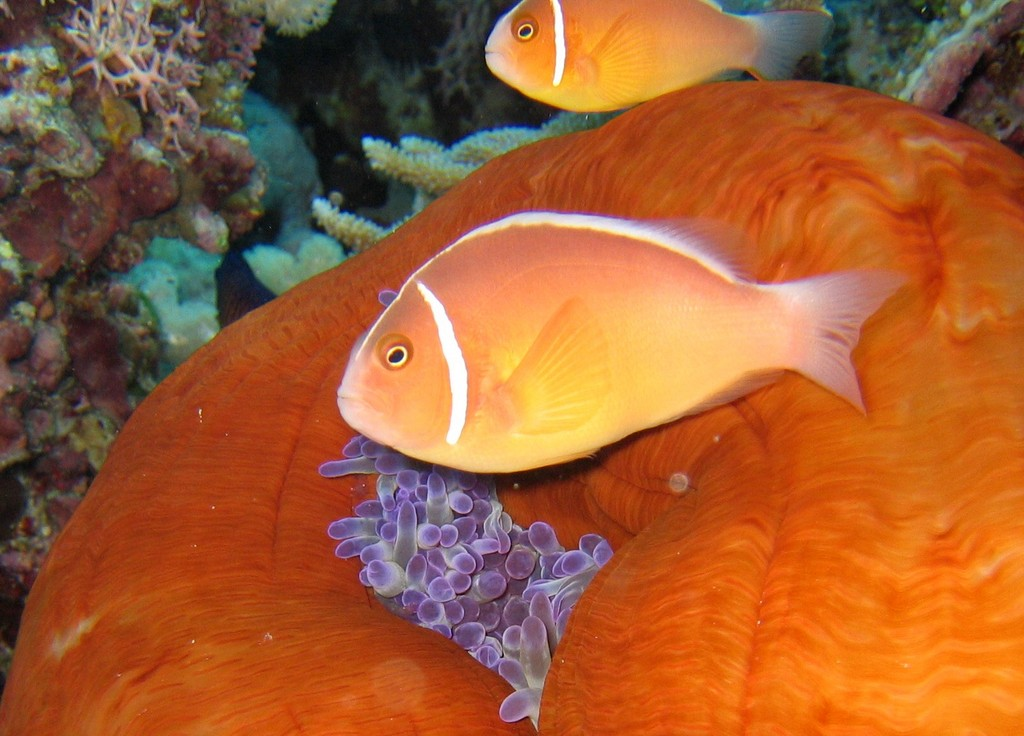
A. perideraion (pink skunk clownfish) showing the distinctive pink body & continuous stripe

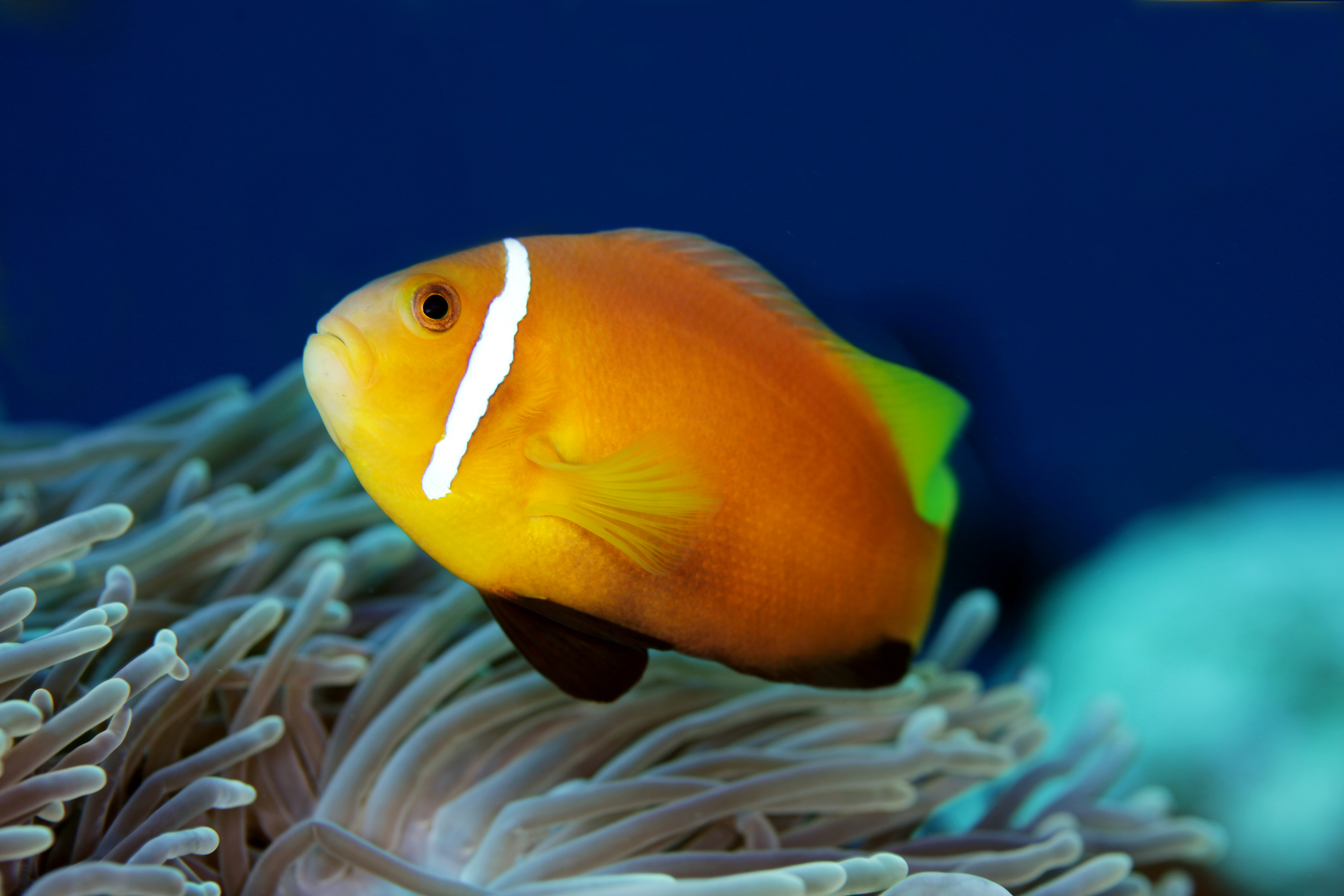
A. nigripes (Maldives anemonefish) showing the distinctive black pelvic & anal fins

== Distribution and habitat ==
A. thielli is believed to have originated in the vicinity of Cebu, Philippines.. Field records are lacking for A. thiellei however the most probable hosts are thought to be:

- Heteractis crispa Sebae anemone
- Stichodactyla mertensii Mertens' carpet sea anemone
