= Hmg 1b-5 =

Ion channel toxin

- Structural image of Hmg 1b-5 - Alphafold-model

Identifiers
- Species: Heteractis magnifica
- UniProt: C0HLS4 BDSB5_HETMG

Properties
- Length: 77 amino acids
- Mass: 4.57 KDa
- Modifications: Disulfide bond positions: 40↔73 42↔66 56↔74
- amino acid sequence of Hmg 1b-5 - Signal peptide - Propeptide- Mature peptide: Met-Asp-Tyr-Gln-Arg-Leu-Leu-Phe-Leu-Phe-Ala-Val-Ala-Met-Val-Ile-Thr-Thr-Thr-Val-Ala-Leu-Pro-Gln-Asp-Thr-Ala-Leu-Met-Asp-Gly-Gln-Leu-Gln-Lys-Arg-Gly-Thr-Pro-Cys-Lys-Cys-Leu-Gly-Tyr-Thr-Gly-Val-Tyr-Trp-Phe-Met-Ile-Thr-Arg-Cys-Pro-Asn-Gly-His-Gly-Tyr-Asn-Leu-Ser-Cys-Pro-Tyr-Phe-Leu-Gly-Val-Cys-Cys-Val-Lys-Lys

Hmg 1b-5 is an APETx-like neurotoxin derived from the Heteractis magnifica sea anemone. Hmg 1b-5 interacts with nicotinic acetylcholine receptors and inhibits acid-sensing ion channel 3.

== Etymology ==
Hmg 1b-5 is a neurotoxin named after the sea anemone Heteractis magnifica, from which it is derived. The 1b refers to its classification within class 1b of the APETx-like peptides, while the number 5 distinguishes it from other related peptides in the same group.

== Source ==
Heteractis magnifica is also known as the magnificent sea anemone, or Ritteri anemone, and belongs to the family Stichodactylidae. Heteractis magnifica produces and stores toxins within the nematocyst organelle of nematoblast cells. A short extension of the nematocyst located on the surface of the cell initiates a mechanism that causes penetration of the target organism and release of the toxins. Heteractis magnifica and other anemones use toxins to deter predators and capture prey. Hmg 1b-5 is one of the many toxins that are produced, with the specific role of Hmg 1b-5 within the anemone’s toxin repertoire not yet being understood.

== Chemistry ==
Hmg 1b-5 belongs to the APETx-like peptide family class 1b, a group of related peptides found in Heteractis magnifica. These peptides share similarities with other toxins, including APETx1–APETx4 and BDS toxins. Hmg 1b-5 counts 77 amino acids in total, containing a 21-amino-acid signal peptide, and 13-amino acid propeptide, both part of the precursor protein together with the mature peptide consisting of 41 amino acids. The molecular mass of Hmg 1b-5 was determined to be 4572.06 Da. The 21-amino-acid signal peptide forms an α-helix at the N-terminal of the protein. The 13-amino-acid propeptide adopts a coil conformation that connects the N-terminal α-helix with the C-terminal β-sheet domain.

== Target and mode of action ==
Hmg 1b-5 acts on acid-sensing ion channel 3 (ASIC3) and nicotinic acetylcholine receptors (nAChR). It inhibits the rat ASIC3 channel with an IC₅₀ of 13.8 ± 0.6 μM. At a concentration of 100 μM, Hmg 1b-5 produced a maximum inhibition of approximately 78% of the inward ion current. ASIC3 is a proton-activated ion channel that is highly selective for sodium ions. It is abundantly expressed in sensory neurons. When exposed to acidic conditions, the channel opens and produces an electrical current. ASIC3 converts prolonged tissue acidity into pain signals. Inhibition of ASIC3 channel activity by Hmg 1b-5, has shown to reduce the inward current flow through the channel. However, its precise mechanism of inhibition is not yet known.

At 20 μM Hmg 1b-5 binds to muscle-type nicotinic acetylcholine receptors, and at 40 μM to human α7 nAChRs. nAChRs are ligand-gated ion channels that allow ions to pass through the cell membrane when acetylcholine binds. They play a role in regulating neuronal activity by influencing the release of neurotransmitters and the excitability of neurons. At nAChRs, Hmg 1b-5 has shown to compete for receptor binding with other toxins such as α-bungarotoxin. However, its precise mechanism of binding and its effect on receptor function have not yet been established.

== Toxicity ==
The effects of Hmg 1b-5 inhibition of ASIC3 channels on pain signaling have not been established. No investigation of Hmg 1b-5 toxicity has been reported, and its effects are therefore unknown. Similar to ASIC3 channels, the effects of Hmg 1b-5 on nAChRs and regulating neuronal activity have not been established.
