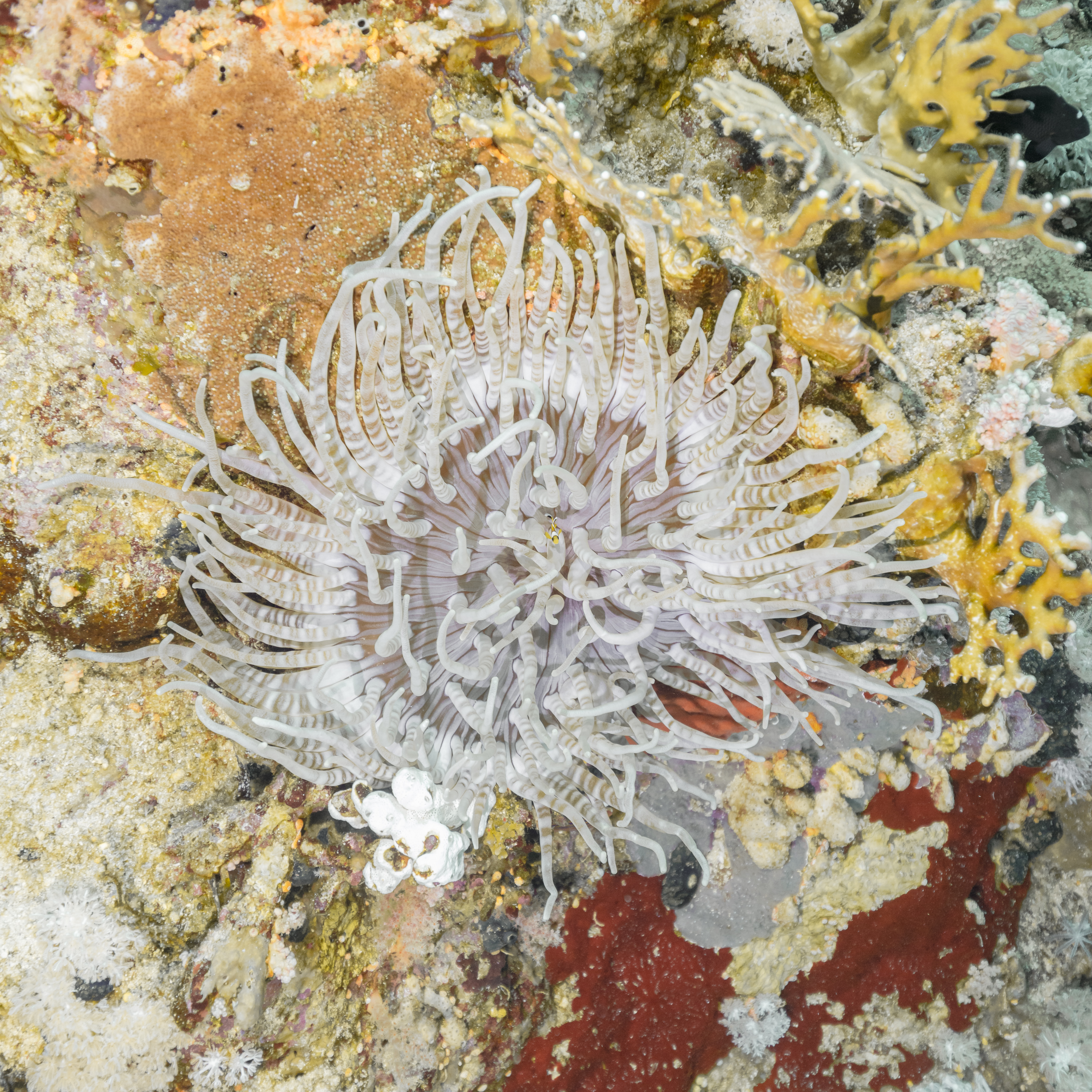
- A Red Sea clownfish in a sebae anemone

Scientific classification
- Kingdom: Animalia
- Phylum: Cnidaria
- Subphylum: Anthozoa
- Class: Hexacorallia
- Order: Actiniaria
- Family: Stichodactylidae
- Genus: Radianthus
- Species: R. crispa

Binomial name
- Radianthus crispa (Hemprich and Ehrenberg in Ehrenberg, 1834)

Synonyms
- List: Actinia crispa Hemprich & Ehrenberg in Ehrenberg, 1834; Actinia paumotensis Couthouy in Dana, 1846; Antheopsis crispa (Ehrenberg, 1834); Antheopsis kuekenthali Kwietniewski; Antheopsis macrodactylus Haddon & Shackleton; Bunodes crispa (Hemprich & Ehrenberg in Ehrenberg, 1834); Bunodes crispus (Hemprich & Ehrenberg in Ehrenberg, 1834); Cereus crispus; Cereus paumotensis; Discosoma macrodactylum Haddon & Shackleton, 1893; Discosoma tuberculata Kwietniewski, 1898; Discosomoides tuberculata; Entacmaea crispa Hemprich & Ehrenberg; Heliactis paumotensis Dana; Heteractis crispa (Hemprich & Ehrenberg in Ehrenberg, 1834); Heteractis macrodactylum (Haddon & Shackleton, 1893); Radianthus crispus (Ehrenberg, 1834); Radianthus kuekenthali Kwietniewski, 1896; Radianthus kükenthali Kwietniewski, 1896; Radianthus lobatus Kwietniewski, 1898; Radianthus macrodactylus (Haddon & Shackleton, 1893; Stoichactis tuberculata Kwietniewski

= Sebae anemone =

Species of sea anemone

The sebae anemone (Radianthus crispa), also known as leathery sea anemone, long tentacle anemone, or purple tip anemone, is a species of sea anemone in the family Stichodactylidae and native to the Indo-Pacific.

It was first described in 1834 by Wilhelm Hemprich and Christian Gottfried Ehrenberg as Actinia crispa.

== Description ==
The sebae anemone is characterized by a flared oral disc that reaches between 20 and 50 cm in diameter and with multiple and long tentacles measuring 10 to 15 cm. These tentacles have rounded tip and the end is often colored with a purple or blue spot. The column, external structure of an anemone visible when the animal is closed, is gray in color and dotted with sticky whitish "warts". The sea anemone, being member of the Hexacorallia, usually carries a number of tentacles multiple of six and they are positioned in concentric circles. These are light beige to purple.

== Distribution and habitat ==
The sebae anemone is widespread throughout the tropical and subtropical waters of the Indo-Pacific area from the eastern coasts of Africa, Red Sea included, to Polynesia and from south Japan to Australia and New-Caledonia.

This sea anemone prefers hard base substrates slightly covered with sand but it can also cling to branching corals from the surface to 40 meters deep.

== Biology ==
The sebae anemone has two ways to feed. The first one is through the inside via photosynthesis of its symbiotic hosts zooxanthellae, living in its tissues. And the second one is through a normal way by capturing its prey via its tentacles that allow it to immobilize its prey (small invertebrates, fry, or juvenile fish).

Its reproduction can be sexual by simultaneous transmission of male and female gametes in the water or asexual by scissiparity; the anemone divides itself into two separate individuals from the foot or the mouth.

The relationship between anemonefish and their host sea anemones is highly nested in structure. With 15 species of hosted anemonefish, the sebae anemone is highly generalist, and mostly hosts generalist anemonefish. A. latezonatus, the wide-band anemonefish, is a specialist only hosted by H. crispa.. In the Red Sea, it is considered a nursery anemone as sexually mature fish are rarely hosted by H. crispa. A study in the northern Red Sea found anemone density affected whether H. crispa hosted anemonefish, with clusters of juvenile fish only found at low-density sites, while either one or no juvenile anemonefish were found in H. crispa at the high-density site. The authors theorised that H. crispa was a nursery anemone due to being unable to adequately protect adult anemonefish from predation, active emigration of fish to Entacmaea quadricolor and/or environmentally controlled cessation of fish growth. Why this would be so in the Red Sea is not clear, when in the western Pacific, adult pairs are found in individuals of H. crispa.

The anemone fish hosted by the sebae anemone are: (Note: In contrast, the sebae anemonefish (Amphiprion sebae), with which it shares part of its common name, is hosted by Stichodactyla haddoni, the saddle anemone.)

- Amphiprion akindynos (Barrier Reef anemonefish)
- A. barberi (Barber's anemonefish)
- A. bicinctus (two-band anemonefish)
- A. chrysopterus (orange-fin anemonefish)
- A. clarkii (Clark's anemonefish)
- A. ephippium (red saddleback anemonefish)
- A. latezonatus (wide-band anemonefish)
- A. leucokranos (white-bonnet anemonefish)
- A. melanopus (red and black anemonefish)
- A. omanensis (Oman anemonefish)
- A. percula (clown anemonefish)
- A. perideraion (pink skunk anemonefish)
- A. polymnus (saddleback anemonefish)
- A. sandaracinos (orange anemonefish)
- A. thiellei (Note: Field records are lacking for A. thiellei and H. crispa is listed as one of the probable hosts.)
- A. tricinctus (three-band anemonefish)

Juveniles of Dascyllus trimaculatus are also associated with H. crispa.

== Gallery ==
Anemonefish in H. crispa

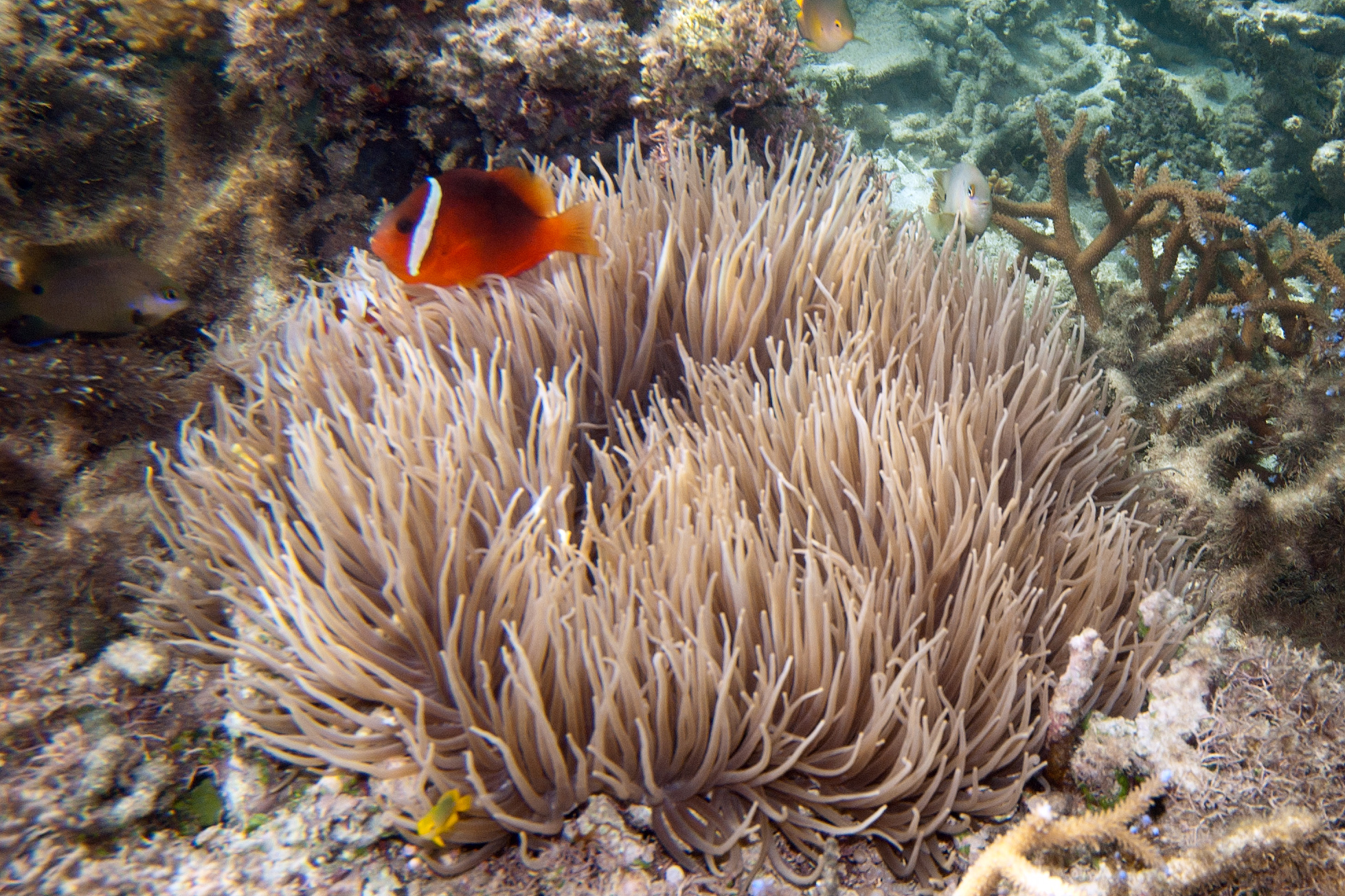
A. barberi (Barber's anemonefish)

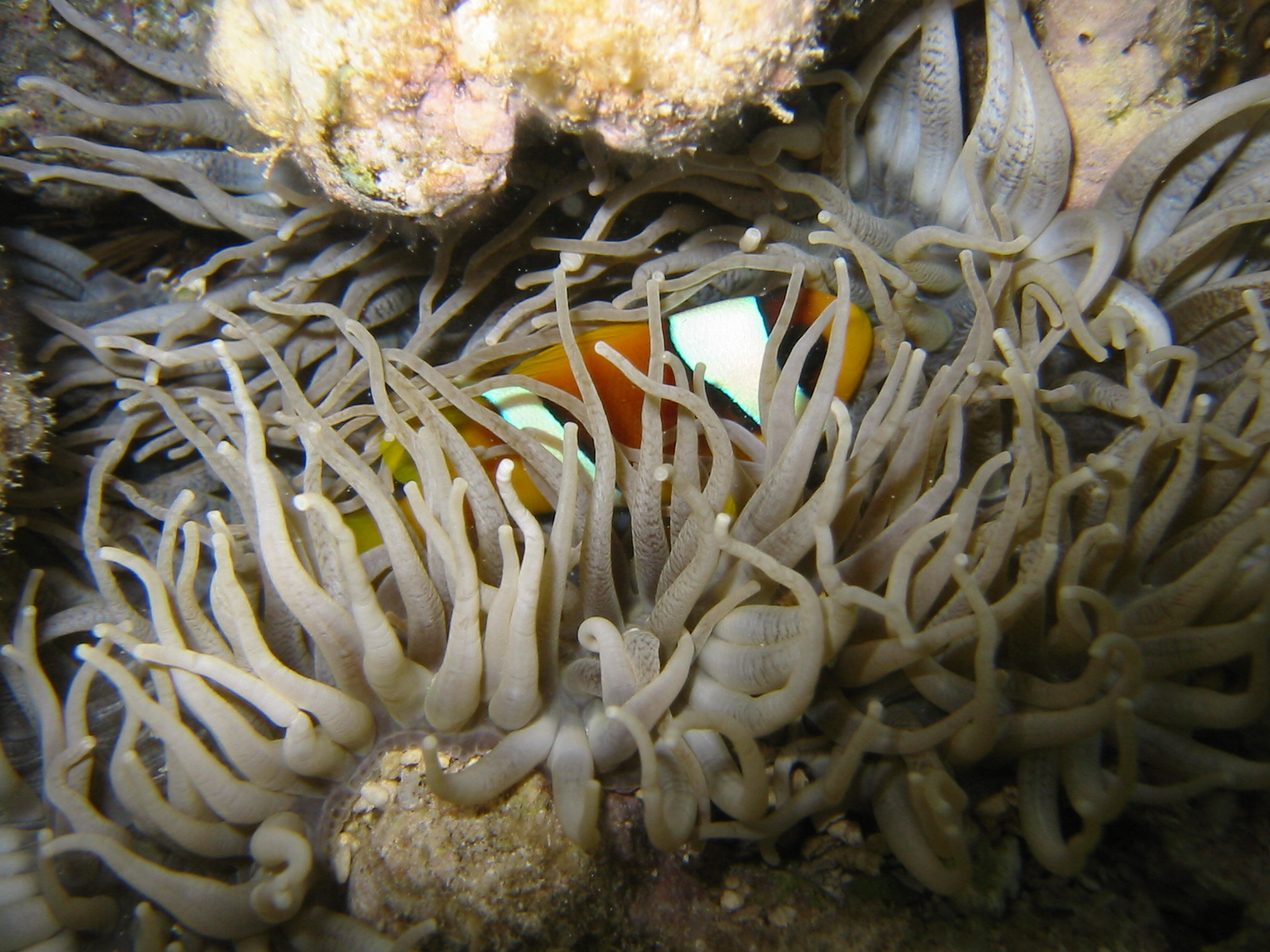
A. bicinctus (two-band anemonefish)

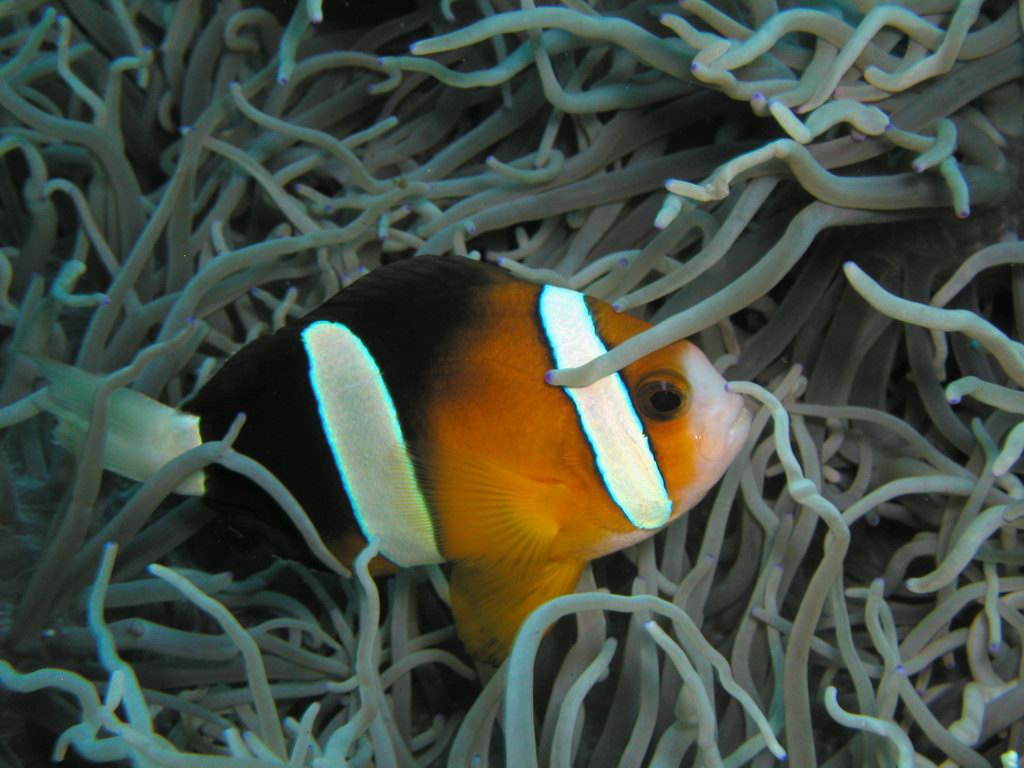
A. clarkii (Clark's anemonefish)

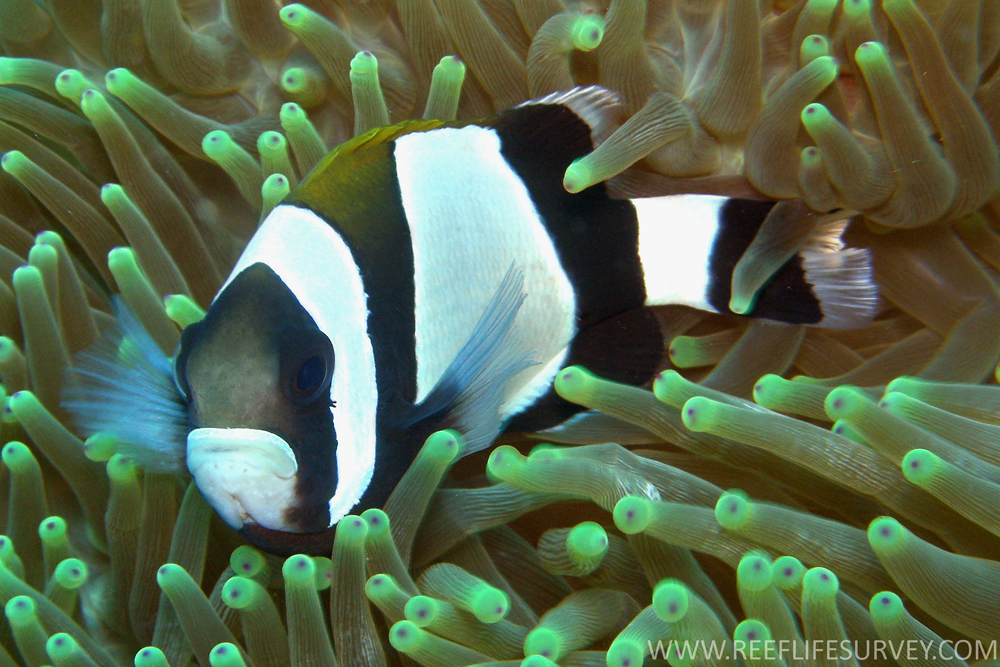
A. latezonatus (wide-band anemonefish)

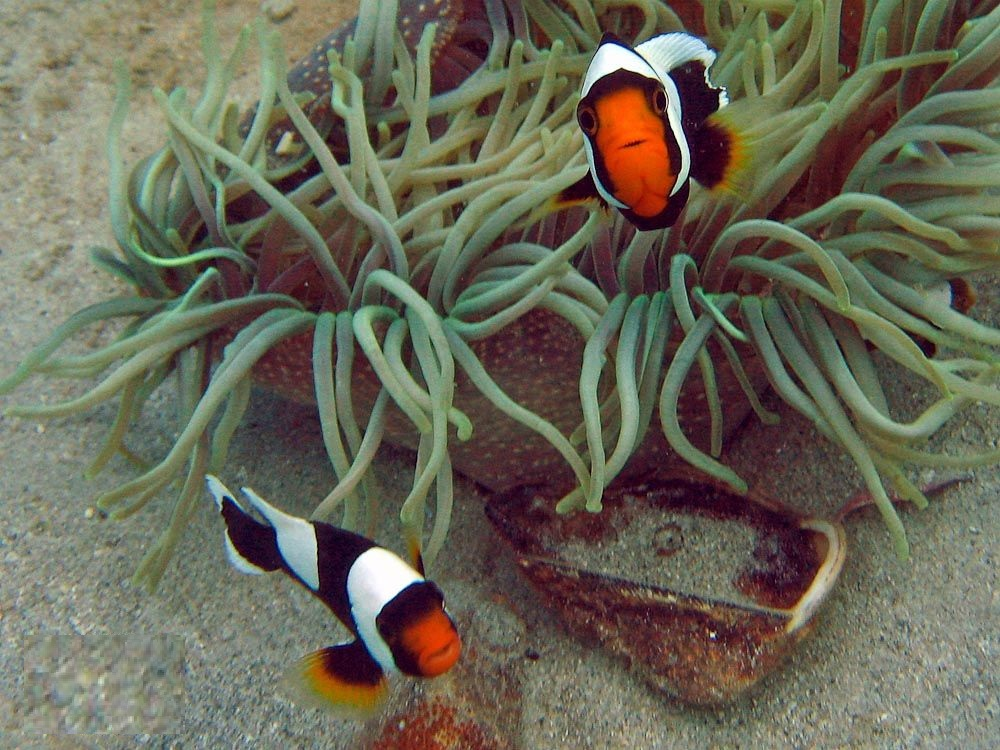
A. polymnus (saddleback anemonefish)

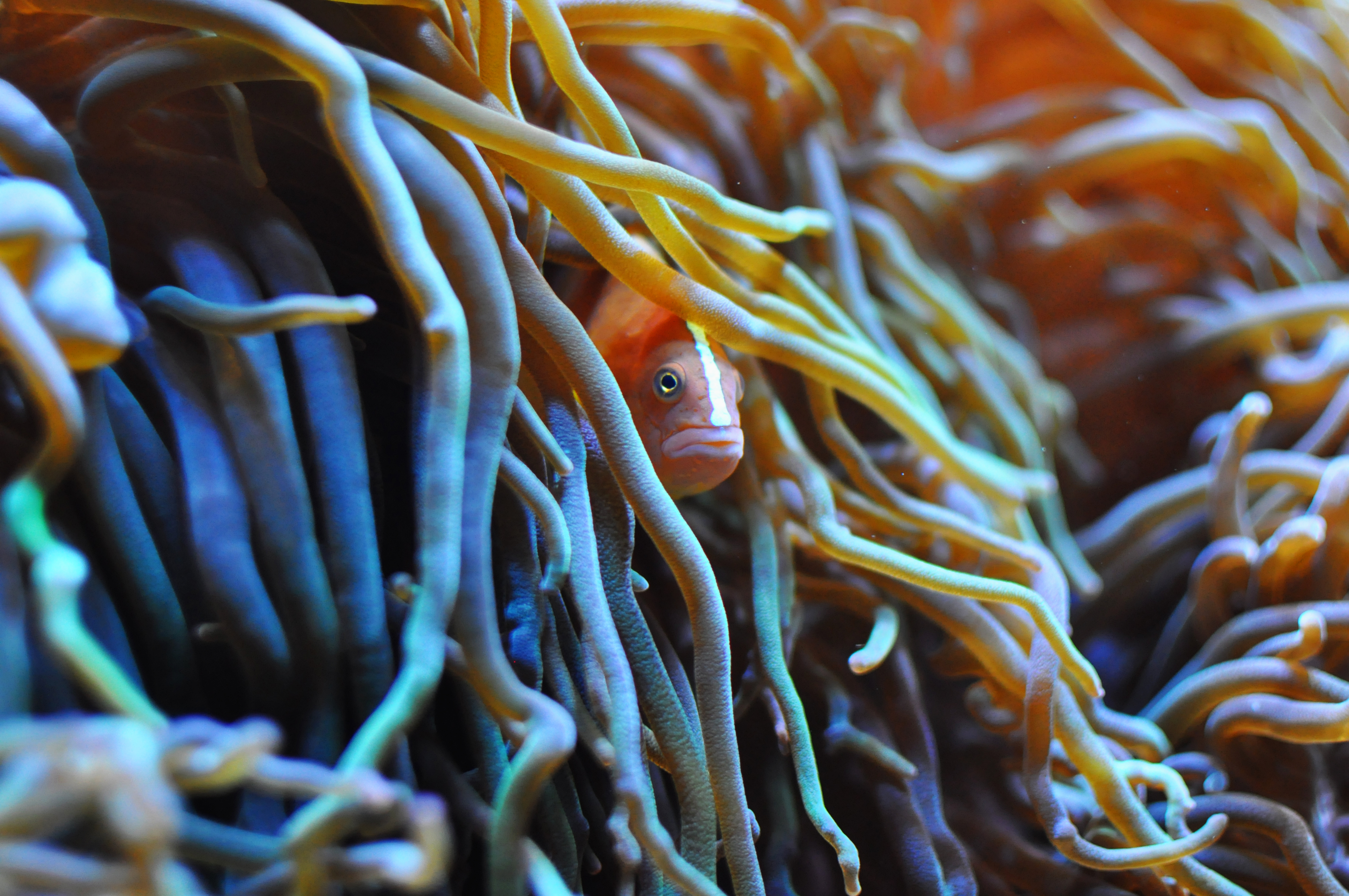
A. sandaracinos (orange skunk anemonefish)
