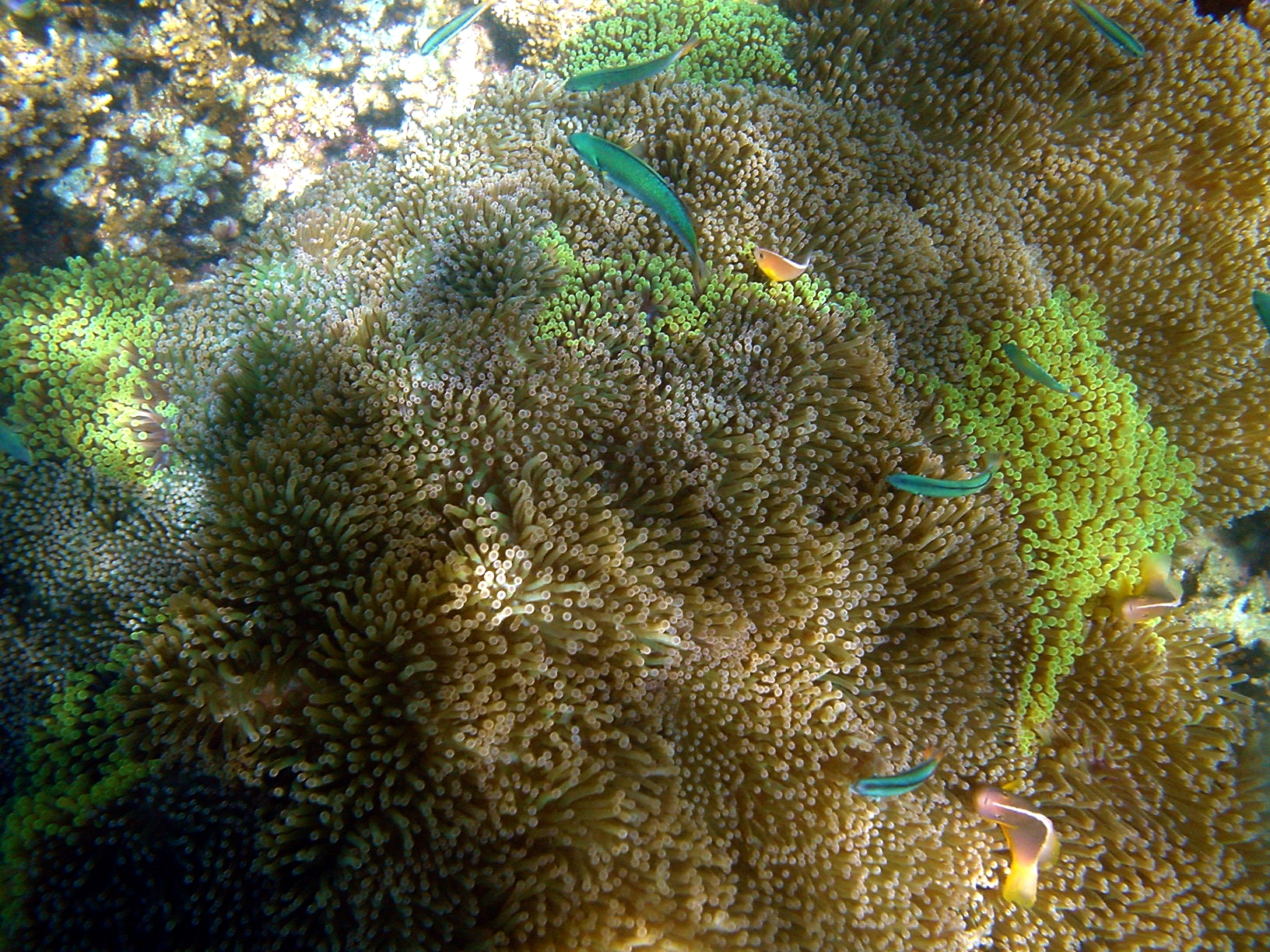
- Stichodactyla mertensii with Amphiprion akallopisos and other unidentified fish in Madagascar

Scientific classification
- Domain: Eukaryota
- Kingdom: Animalia
- Phylum: Cnidaria
- Subphylum: Anthozoa
- Class: Hexacorallia
- Order: Actiniaria
- Family: Stichodactylidae
- Genus: Stichodactyla
- Species: S. mertensii

Binomial name
- Stichodactyla mertensii (Brandt, 1835)

Synonyms
- Stichodactyla meretensii

= Stichodactyla mertensii =

Species of sea anemone

Stichodactyla mertensii, commonly known as Mertens' carpet sea anemone, is a species of sea anemones in the family Stichodactylidae. It is regarded as the largest sea anemone with a diameter of over 1 m (3.3 ft), the next largest being Heteractis magnifica, which has longer tentacles. This species has an oral disc that can be described as more ovoid than circular that contours to the surrounding substrate and is attached to the substrate by adhesive verrucae, which are wart-like projections. Its blunt or pointed tentacles are uniformly shaped, and are only about 1–2 centimetres (0.39–0.79 in) long. It contains obligate symbiotic zooxanthellae, and is a host to around half the species of anemonefish and one damselfish, Dascyllus trimaculatus.

== Distribution ==
S. mertensii is found on rocky or coral substrate and is widespread throughout the tropical and subtropical waters of the Hawaii, USA, North America, Indo-Pacific area. from Mauritius to Fiji and from the Ryukyu Islands of southern Japan to Australia. While this species can be confused with Stichodactyla gigantea and S. haddoni, they are most easily distinguished by habitat since the former two prefer sand while S. mertensii prefers rocky or coral substrate.

== Biology ==
The anemonefish generally said to be hosted by S. mertensii are:

- Amphiprion akallopisos
- A. akindynos
- A. allardi
- A. bicinctus
- A. chrysogaster
- A. chrysopterus
- A. clarkii
- A. fuscocaudatus
- A. latifasciatus
- A. leucokranos
- A. ocellaris
- A. sandaracinos
- A. tricinctus

Other anemonefish said to be hosted by S. mertensii are:

- A. ephippium
- A. polymnus
- A. thiellei (Note: Field records are lacking for A. thiellei and S. mertensii is listed as one of the probable hosts.)

The relationship between anemonefish and their host sea anemones is highly nested in structure. With at least 13 species of hosted anemonefish, S. mertensii is highly generalist, and appears to be a preferred host. A. akallopisos is the only anemonefish in the Comoro Islands and is hosted by Heteractis magnifica and S. mertensii. It appears that in the Seychelles that A. fuscocaudatus displaces A. akallopisos from S. mertensii while in the Maldives A. akallopisos is displaced from S. mertensii by A. clarkii, as in both locations A. akallopisos is only hosted by H. magnifica. There are 2 specialist anemonefish that are only found with S. mertensii, A. fuscocaudatus and A. latifasciatus.

Recently, Amphiprion clarkii and Amphiprion sandaracinos were observed to coexist within one host anemone of Stichodactyla mertensii. A. clarkii was not aggressive towards the A. sandaracinos but was aggressive towards all fish approaching the anemone. The anemonefish didn't divide the host into separate territories.

== Anemonefish color variations ==
Some species of anemonefish, including A. chrysogaster, A. chrysopterus, A. clarkii, A. percula and A. tricinctus have a melanistic variation when associated with anemone of the genus Stichodactyla. The change in body and or fin color from orange to black can occur within hours when transferred to the anemone. The fish then changes back from black to orange when removed from the host, although the change back takes longer. Why this occurs and its benefits to either partner are unknown.

Other species do not show any such variation including A. akallopisos, A. akindynos, A. allardi, A. bicinctus, A. fuscocaudatus, A. latifasciatus, A. leucokranos and A. sandaracinos.

There is a black variation of A. ocellaris, however it is not known whether this is associated with any specific anemone.

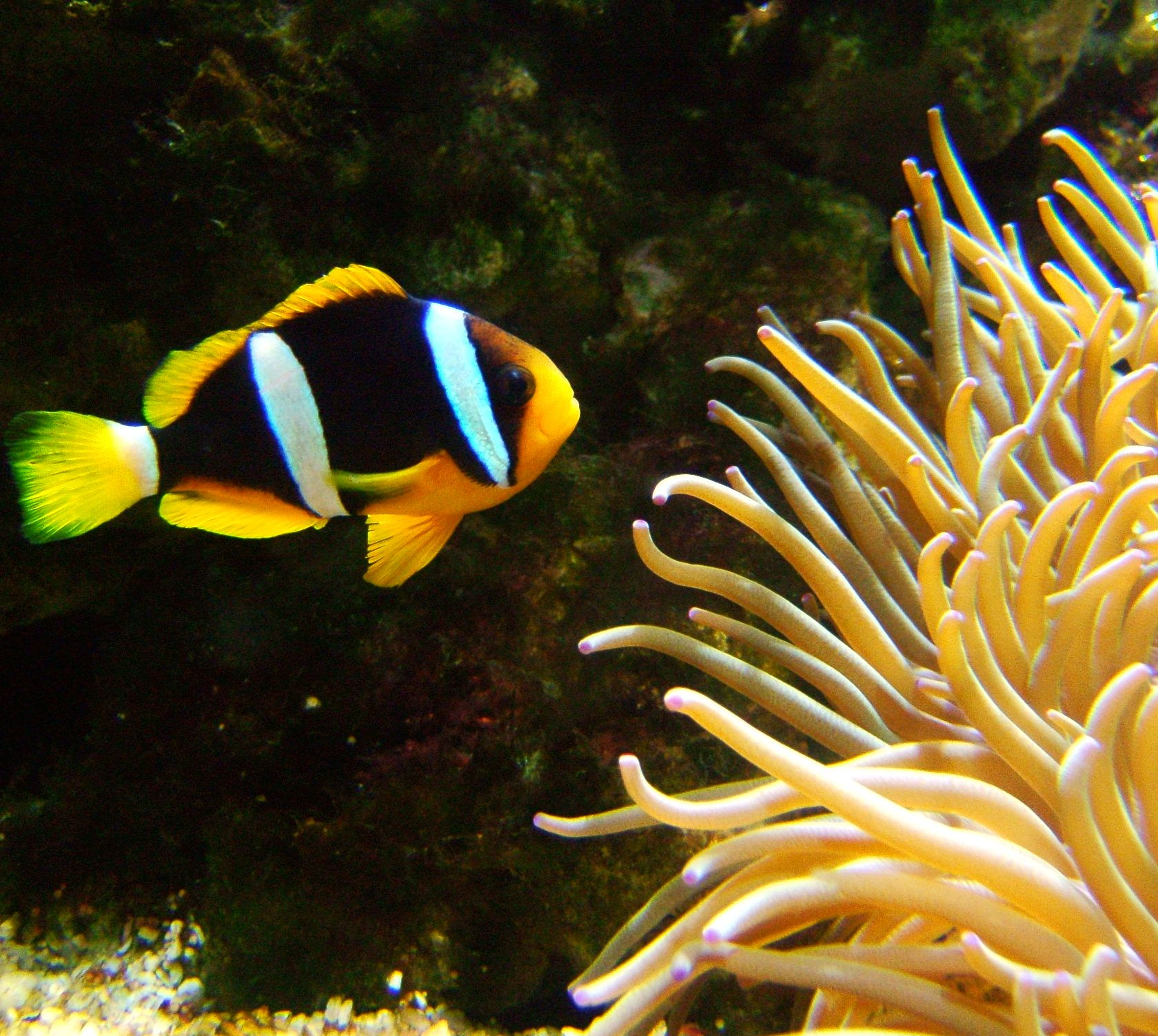
A. clarkii in a 'normal' color

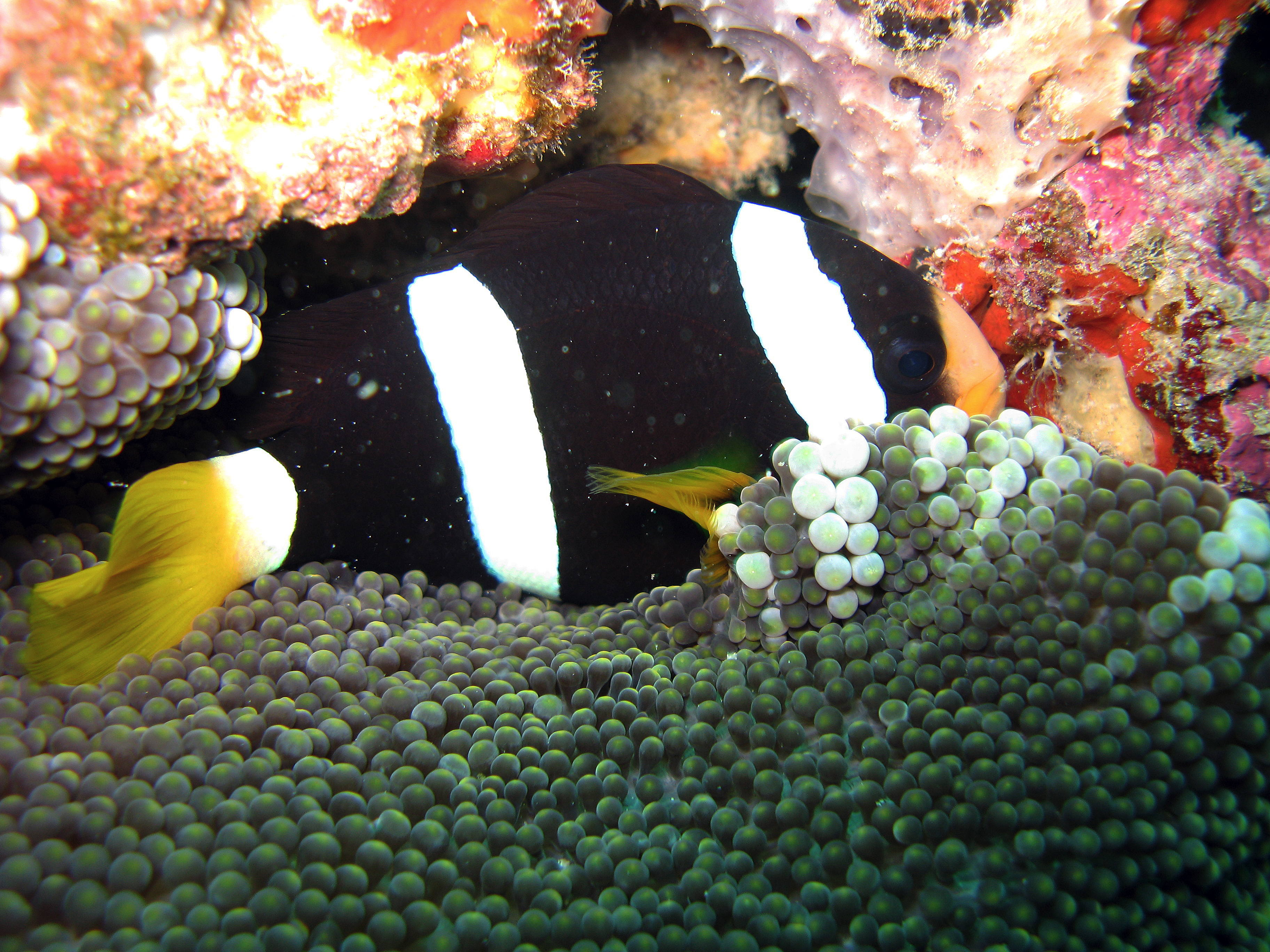
A. clarkii showing a melanistic variation
