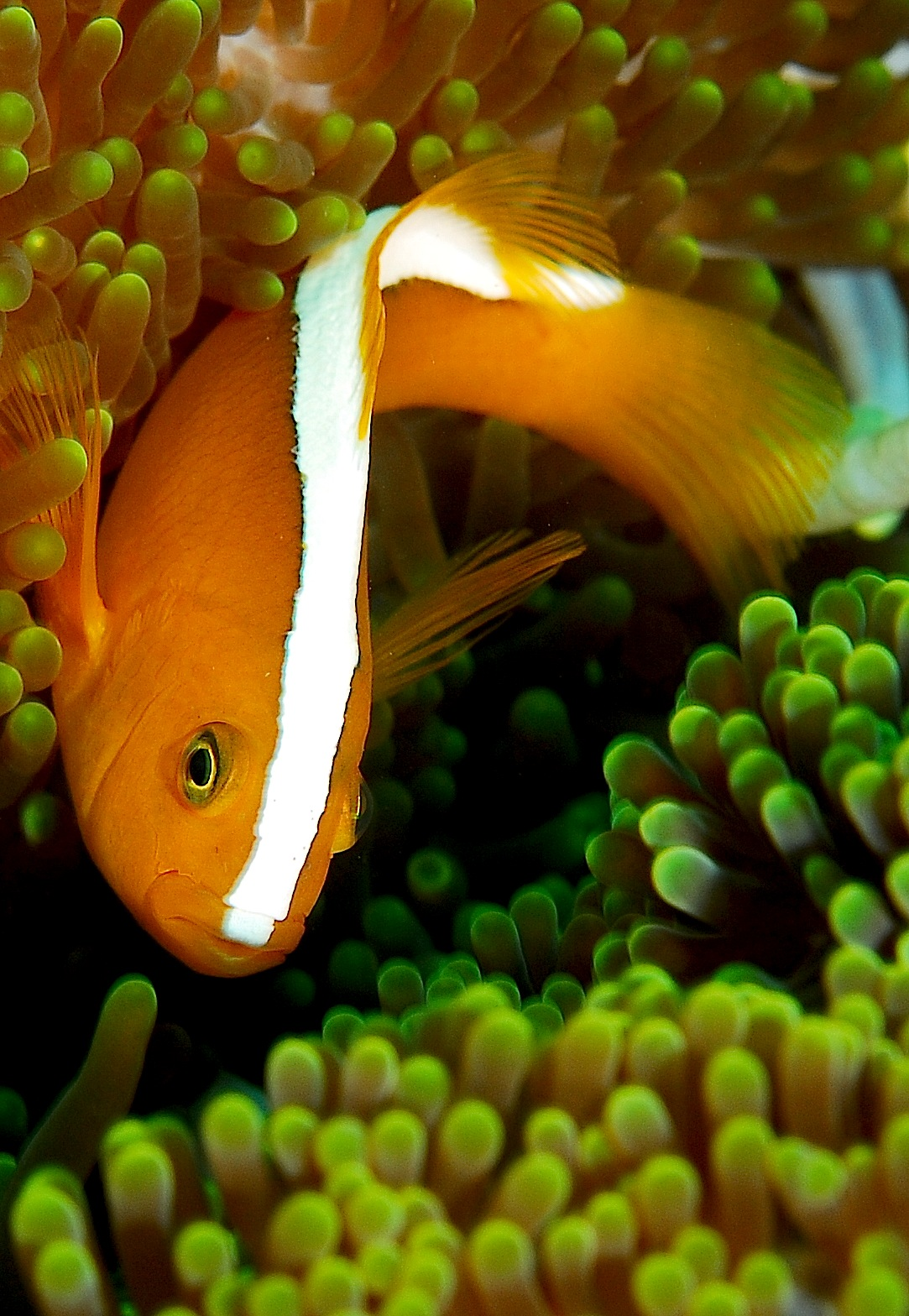

Conservation status
- Least Concern (IUCN 3.1)

Scientific classification
- Kingdom: Animalia
- Phylum: Chordata
- Class: Actinopterygii
- Order: Blenniiformes
- Family: Pomacentridae
- Genus: Amphiprion
- Species: A. sandaracinos

Binomial name
- Amphiprion sandaracinos Allen, 1972

= Orange skunk clownfish =

Species of fish

Amphiprion sandaracinos, also known as the orange skunk clownfish or orange anemonefish, is a species of anemonefish that is distinguished by its broad white stripe along the dorsal ridge. Like all anemonefishes it forms a symbiotic mutualism with sea anemones and is unaffected by the stinging tentacles of the host anemone. It is a sequential hermaphrodite with a strict sized based dominance hierarchy: the female is largest, the breeding male is second largest, and the male non-breeders get progressively smaller as the hierarchy descends. They exhibit protandry, meaning the breeding male will change to female if the sole breeding female dies, with the largest non-breeder becomes the breeding male.

== Description ==
A. sandaracinos is one of the smaller anemonefish, which grows up to 11 cm (4.3 in) as a female and 3 to 6.5 cm (1.2 to 2.6 in) as a male. Its body has a stock appearance, oval shape, compressed laterally and with a round profile. Its coloration is bright orange, with a white stripe on the dorsal ridge from the superior lip, passing between the eyes and ending at the caudal fin base. All the fins have the same coloration as the body except the dorsal fin which is partially white. Its iris is bright yellow.

== Distribution and habitat ==
A. sandaracinos is found in the center of the Indo-Pacific area, known as the Coral Triangle, from the Philippines to Indonesia and New Guinea.It is also found in north western Australia, Christmas Island, Melanesia and to the Ryukyu Islands of southern Japan. A. sandaracinos typically lives in small groups on outer reef slopes or in lagoons at a maximal depth of 20 metres (66 ft).

=== Host anemones ===
The relationship between anemonefish and their host sea anemones is not random and instead is highly nested in structure. A. sandaracinos is a specialist, being hosted primarily by one out of the ten host anemones:

- Heteractis crispa Sebae anemone (rarely)
- Stichodactyla mertensii Mertens' carpet sea anemone (usually)

On the northern coast of New Guinea, male A. sandaracinos occasionally breed with the significantly larger female A. chrysopterus and their offspring is the hybrid anemonefish A. leucokranos.

In 2011 3 individuals of A. sandaracinos and a pair of A. clarkii were observed to coexist within one host anemone of Stichodactyla mertensii. A. clarkii was not aggressive towards the A. sandaracinos but was aggressive towards all fish approaching the anemone. The anemonefish didn't divide the host into separate territories.

== Feeding ==
Like all anemonefish, A. sandaracinos is omnivorous and its diet is based on zooplankton, small benthic crustaceans and algaes.

== Conservation status ==
Anemonefish and their host anemones are found on coral reefs and face similar environmental issues. Like corals, anemone's contain intracellular endosymbionts, zooxanthellae, and can suffer from bleaching due to triggers such as increased water temperature or acidification. The other threat to anemonefish is collection for the marine aquarium trade where anemonefish make up 43% of the global marine ornamental trade, and 25% of the global trade comes from fish bred in captivity, while the majority are captured from the wild, accounting for decreased densities in exploited areas. While bleaching is a significant threat to anemonefish and their host anemones, there is evidence suggesting that collection compounds the localised impact of bleaching. A. sandaracinos was the only species of anemonefish that was evaluated in the 2012 release of the IUCN Red List and it was listed as being of least concern as the threats are mainly of a localised nature and do not pose a significant threat to the global population of this species.

== In aquaria ==
A. sandaracinos along with their host anemones are collected for the aquarium trade, and the anemonefish has been bred in captivity.
