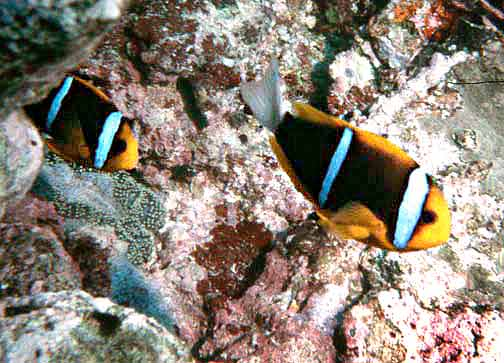

Conservation status
- Least Concern (IUCN 3.1)

Scientific classification
- Kingdom: Animalia
- Phylum: Chordata
- Class: Actinopterygii
- Order: Blenniiformes
- Family: Pomacentridae
- Genus: Amphiprion
- Species: A. chrysopterus

Binomial name
- Amphiprion chrysopterus Cuvier, 1830

= Orange-fin anemonefish =

Species of fish

The orange-fin anemonefish (Amphiprion chrysopterus) is a marine fish belonging to the family Pomacentridae, the clownfishes and damselfishes, found in the Western Pacific north of the Great Barrier Reef from the surface to 20 m, to include the Pacific Ocean between Queensland, Australia, and New Guinea to the Marshall and Tuamotus Islands. It can grow to 17 cm in length.

== Characteristics of anemonefish ==
Clownfish or anemonefish are fishes, that in the wild, form symbiotic mutualisms with sea anemones and are unaffected by the stinging tentacles of the host anemone, see Amphiprioninae § Mutualism. The sea anemone protects the clownfish from predators, as well as providing food through the scraps left from the anemone's meals and occasional dead anemone tentacles. In return, the clownfish defends the anemone from its predators and parasites. Clownfish are small-sized, 10–18 cm (3.9–7.1 in), and depending on species, they are overall yellow, orange, or a reddish or blackish color, and many show white bars or patches. Within species, color variations may occur, most commonly according to distribution, but also based on sex, age, and host anemone. Clownfish are found in warmer waters of the Indian and Pacific Oceans and the Red Sea in sheltered reefs or in shallow lagoons.

In a group of clownfish, a strict dominance hierarchy exists. The largest and most aggressive fish is female and is found at the top. Only two clownfish, a male and a female, in a group reproduce through external fertilization. Clownfish are sequential hermaphrodites, meaning that they develop into males first, and when they mature, they become females.

They feed on mainly on planktonic copepods, algae, echiuroid and sipunculoid worms, and pelagic tunicates.

Adults generally inhabit reef passages and slopes. They are oviparous, with distinct pairing during breeding. Eggs are demersal and adhere to the substrate. Males guard and aerate the eggs.

== Description ==
The fish's body is short and deep; the head is small. Generally yellow in the body edges, it is yellow-brown to dark brown in the middle sides, with two white vertical stripes, the first behind the eye and the second before the anus. The fins are yellow to orange. Juveniles are a dull orange. The tail fins are generally white or yellow and vary depending on the area of origin (fish in the area surrounding Fiji and Tonga have yellow tails, fish from the Marshall and Solomon Islands have white tails). Dorsal spines (total) number 10 - 11; dorsal soft rays (total) are 15–17 in number. Two anal spines and 13-14 anal soft rays are present. It can grow to 17 cm in length.

=== Color variations ===
Fish that are generally blackish are associated with the host anemone Stichodactyla mertensii, Mertens' carpet sea anemone. Heteractis crispa is associated with brown males and juveniles. Only orange or brown juveniles are associated with Heteractis aurora (beaded sea anemone).

=== Similar species ===
A. chrysopterus may be confused with three other species with overlapping distribution, A. akindynos, A. clarkii, and A. tricinctus. A. chrysopterus tends to be darker than A. akindynos and the presence of black pelvic and anal fins eliminates A. akindynos. A wider midbar or tail bar is indicative of A. clarkii. A. tricinctus also has a tail bar unless it is solid black.

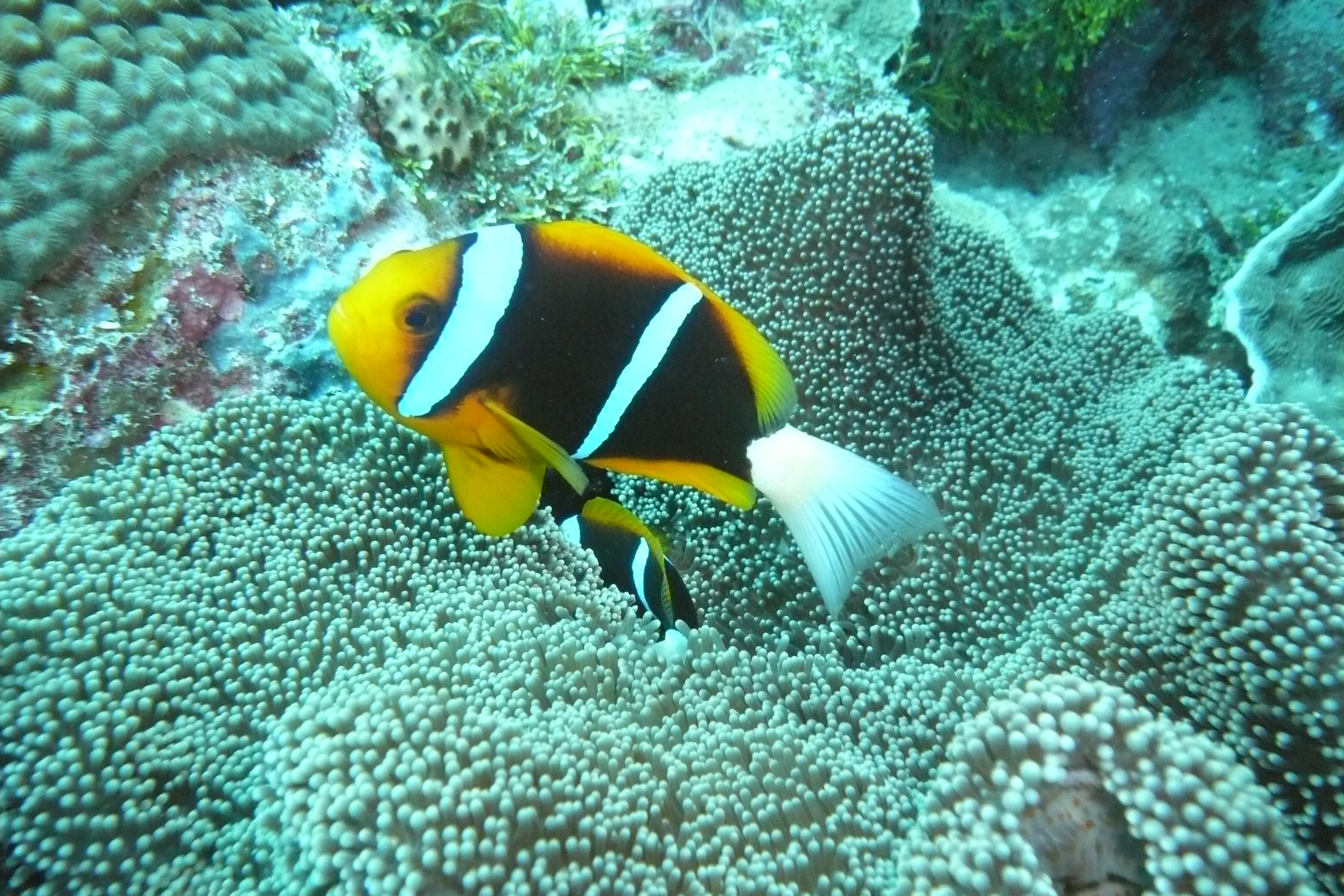
A. chrysopterus (orange-fin anemonefish), Palau

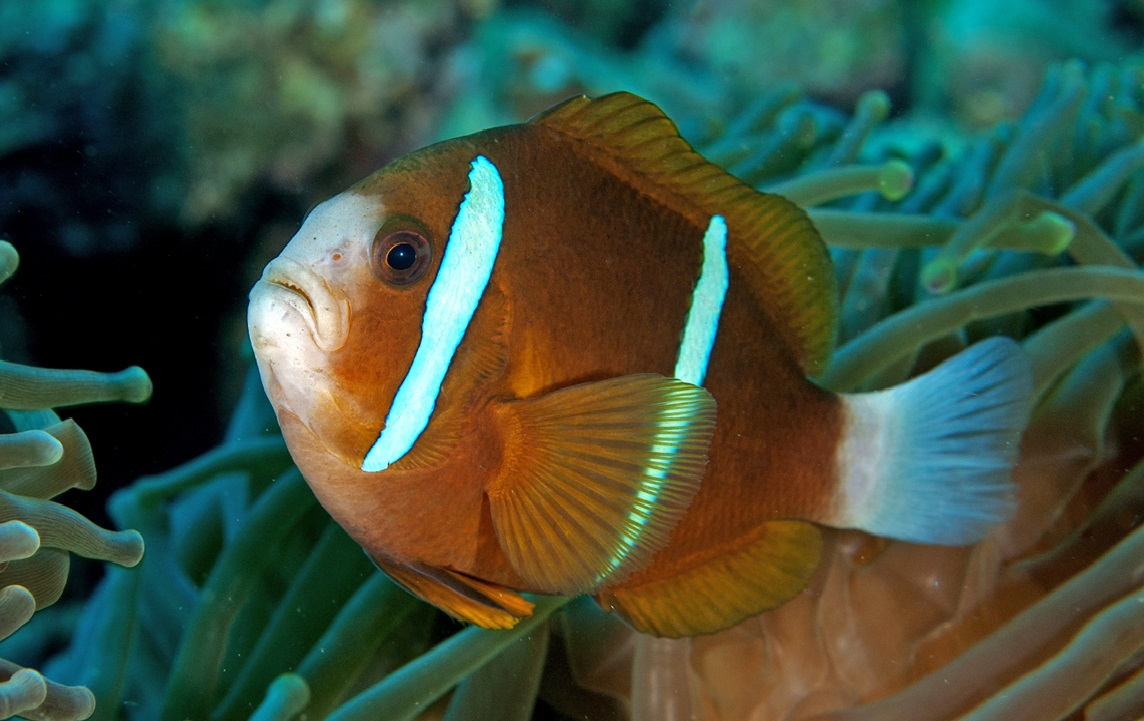
A. akindynos (Barrier Reef anemonefish)

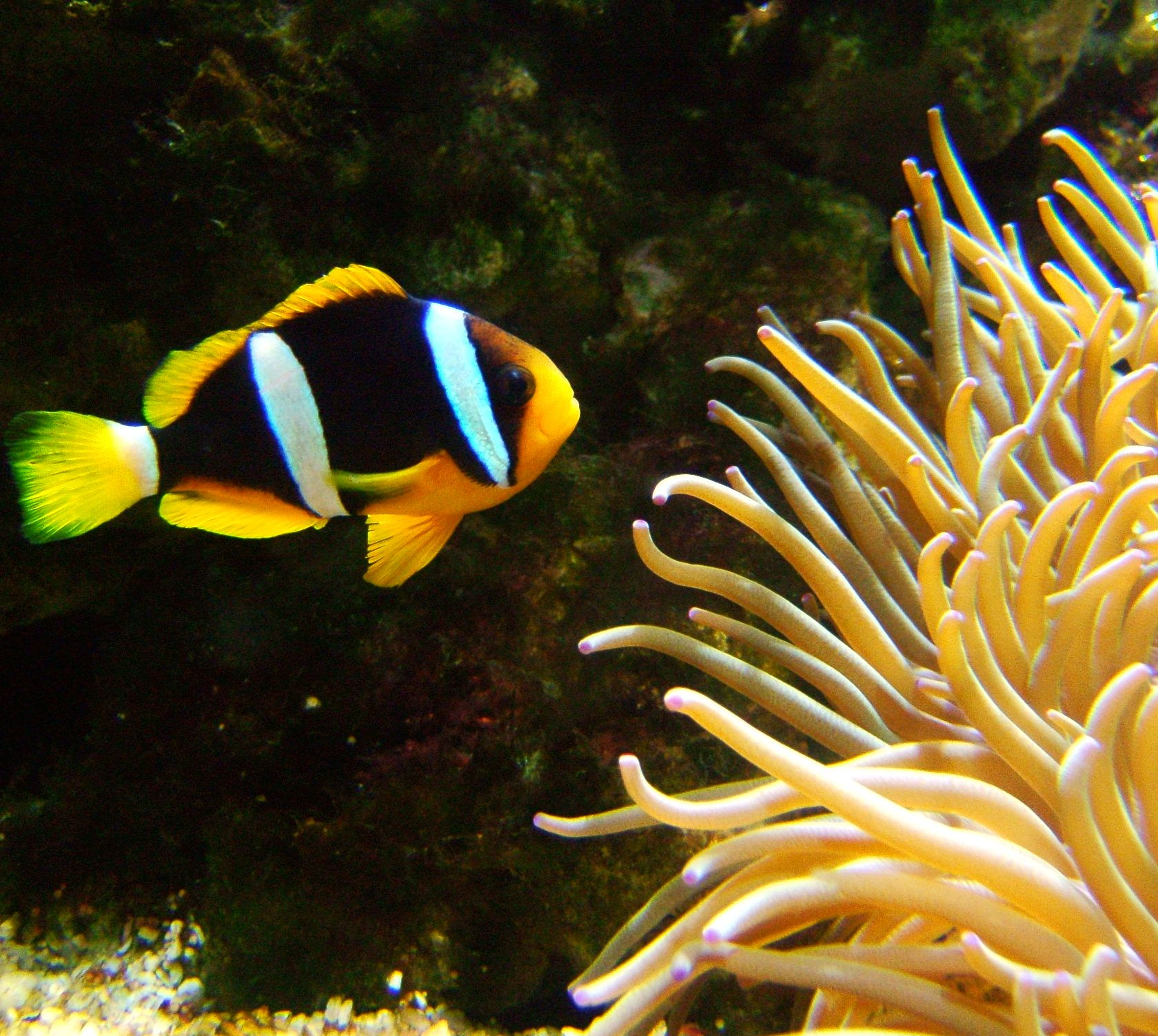
A. clarkii (Clark's anemonefish)

== Distribution and habitat ==
A. chrysopterus is found in the Western Pacific north of the Great Barrier Reef from the surface to 20 m, to include the Pacific Ocean between Queensland and New Guinea to the Marshall and Tuamotus Islands.

=== Host anemones ===
A. chrysopterus is associated with these species of anemones:

- Entacmaea quadricolor bubble-tip anemone
- Heteractis aurora beaded sea anemone
- Heteractis crispa sebae anemone
- Heteractis magnifica magnificent sea anemone
- Macrodactyla doreensis corkscrew tentacle sea anemone
- Stichodactyla haddoni Haddon's anemone
- Stichodactyla mertensii Mertens' carpet sea anemone
