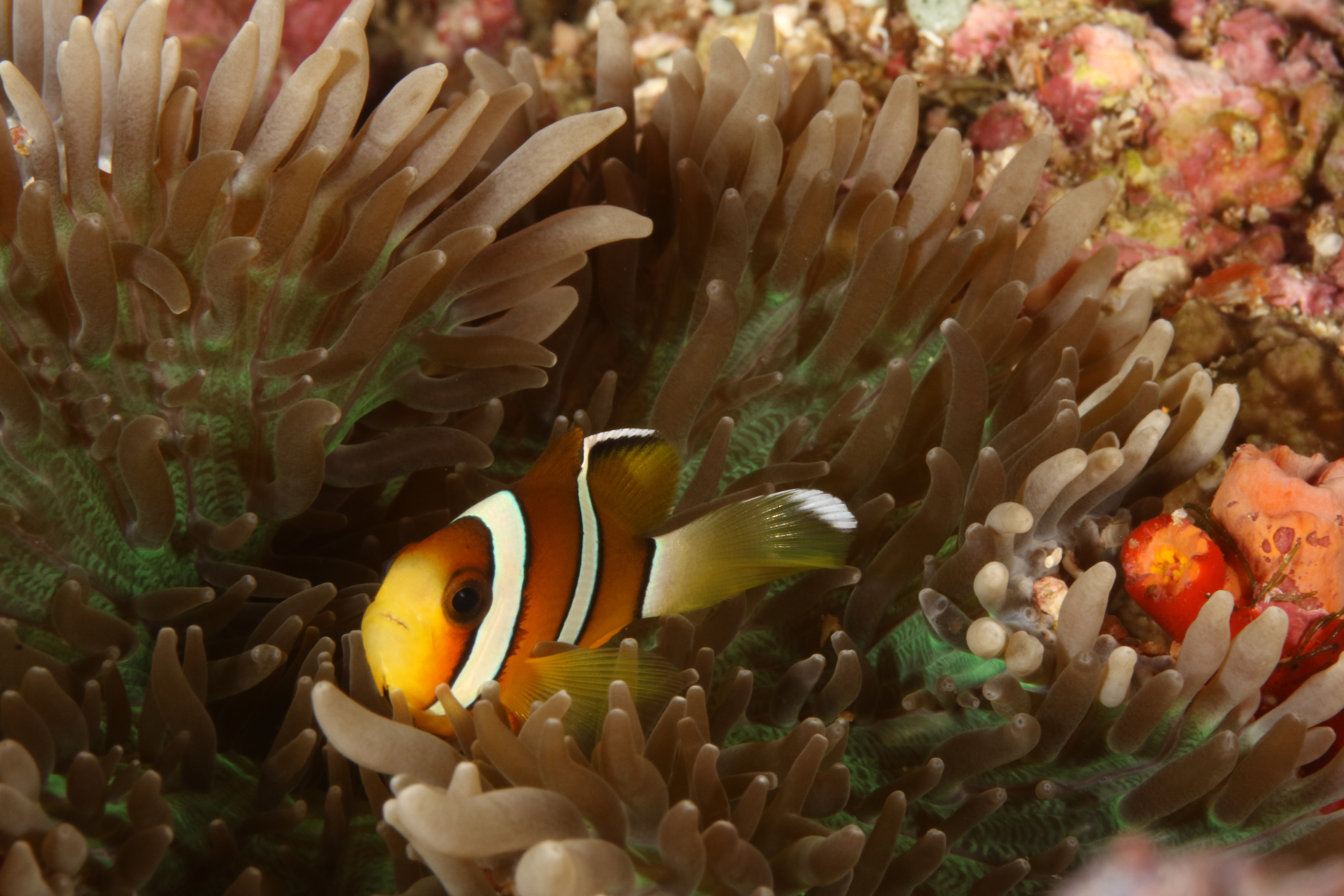

Conservation status
- Least Concern (IUCN 3.1)

Scientific classification
- Kingdom: Animalia
- Phylum: Chordata
- Class: Actinopterygii
- Order: Blenniiformes
- Family: Pomacentridae
- Genus: Amphiprion
- Species: A. tricinctus

Binomial name
- Amphiprion tricinctus Schultz & Welander, 1953

= Three-band anemonefish =

Species of fish

The three-band anemonefish (Amphiprion tricinctus) is a species of anemonefish endemic to the Marshall Islands in the western part of the Pacific Ocean. Like all anemonefishes, it forms a symbiotic mutualism with sea anemones and is unaffected by the stinging tentacles of its host. It is a sequential hermaphrodite with a strict size-based dominance hierarchy; the female is largest, the breeding male is second largest, and the male nonbreeders get progressively smaller as the hierarchy descends. They exhibit protandry, meaning the breeding male changes to female if the sole breeding female dies, with the largest nonbreeder becoming the breeding male. The fish's natural diet includes zooplankton.

== Description ==
The body of A. tricinctus is yellow-orange at the snout, belly, and pelvic and anal fins, tending to dark brown or black at the tail. As the common name suggests, as an adult it has three white bands or bars. They can grow to be about 13 cm (5.1 in) long

=== Color variations ===
As A. tricinctus is endemic to the Marshall Islands, no geographic variation is seen, bute variations to the proportions of orange and black occur, from predominately orange through to predominantly black and the occasional aberrant coloration. Fish living with the host anemone Stichodactyla mertensii, Mertens' carpet sea anemone, are frequently black except for the snout and bars.

=== Similar species ===
Two other species have three body bars and a dark tail, A. chrysogaster and A. fuscocaudatus, but the species are geographically separated. Three other species of anemonefish are found in the Marshall Islands, A. chrysopterus, A. melanopus, and A. perideraion. These are easily distinguished from A. tricinctus as A. chrysopterus has two body bars and a whitish caudal fin, A. melanopus only has a head bar, and A. perideraion has a distinctive white stripe on the dorsal ridge. Genetic analysis has shown that A. tricinctus is closely related to A. clarkii and this clade is significantly different from the other species traditionally considered part of the A. clarkii complex.

== Distribution and habitat ==
A. tricinctus is endemic to the Marshall Islands in the western part of the Pacific Ocean and is found in lagoons and pinnacle and seaward reefs. Whilst it is most commonly found at depths of 3 to 40 m (9.8 to 131.2 ft), it is occasionally found hosted by solitary specimens of Entacmaea quadricolor on seaward reef slopes in excess of 40 m (130 ft) deep.

=== Host anemones ===
The relationship between anemonefish and their host sea anemones is not random and instead is highly nested in structure. A. tricinctus is highly generalised, being hosted by eight of the 9 host anemones found in the Marshall Islands. A. tricinctus is generally said to be associated with these species of anemone:

- Entacmaea quadricolor bubble-tip anemone
- Heteractis aurora beaded sea anemone (mostly juvenile)
- Heteractis crispa sebae anemone
- Stichodactyla haddoni
- Stichodactyla mertensii Mertens' carpet sea anemone

Many locations in the Marshall Islands have not been scientifically surveyed, and A. tricinctus has been reported to be hosted by these species of anemone:

- Heteractis magnifica magnificent sea anemone (rarely)
- Heteractis malu delicate sea anemone (rarely)
- Macrodactyla doreensis long-tentacle anemone (Note: The Marshall Islands are significantly outside the previously recorded range for M. doreensis, which is not otherwise reported east of New Guinea.)

== Conservation status ==
Anemonefish and their host anemones are found on coral reefs and face similar environmental issues. Like corals, anemone's contain intracellular endosymbionts, zooxanthellae, and can suffer from bleaching due to triggers such as increased water temperature or acidification. Characteristics known to elevate the risk of extinction are small geographic range, small local population, and extreme habitat specialisation. A. tricinctus is an endemic species, confined to the Marshall Islands, and this species' ability to use a variety of anemone hosts is thought to reduce the risk of extinction associated with specialisation.

== In the aquarium ==
Specimens of A. tricinctus are occasionally for sale and the species has been bred in captivity.
