= Sand anemone =

Sand anemone may refer to:

- Heteractis aurora (Quoy & Gaimard, 1833), also known as the beaded sea anemone and many other names
- Heteractis malu (Haddon & Shackleton, 1893), also known as the delicate sea anemone and white sand anemone
- Oulactis muscosa (Drayton in Dana, 1846), also known as the speckled anemone
- Urticina columbiana Verrill, 1922, also known as the crusty red anemone, columbia sand anemone, and sand-rose anemone
