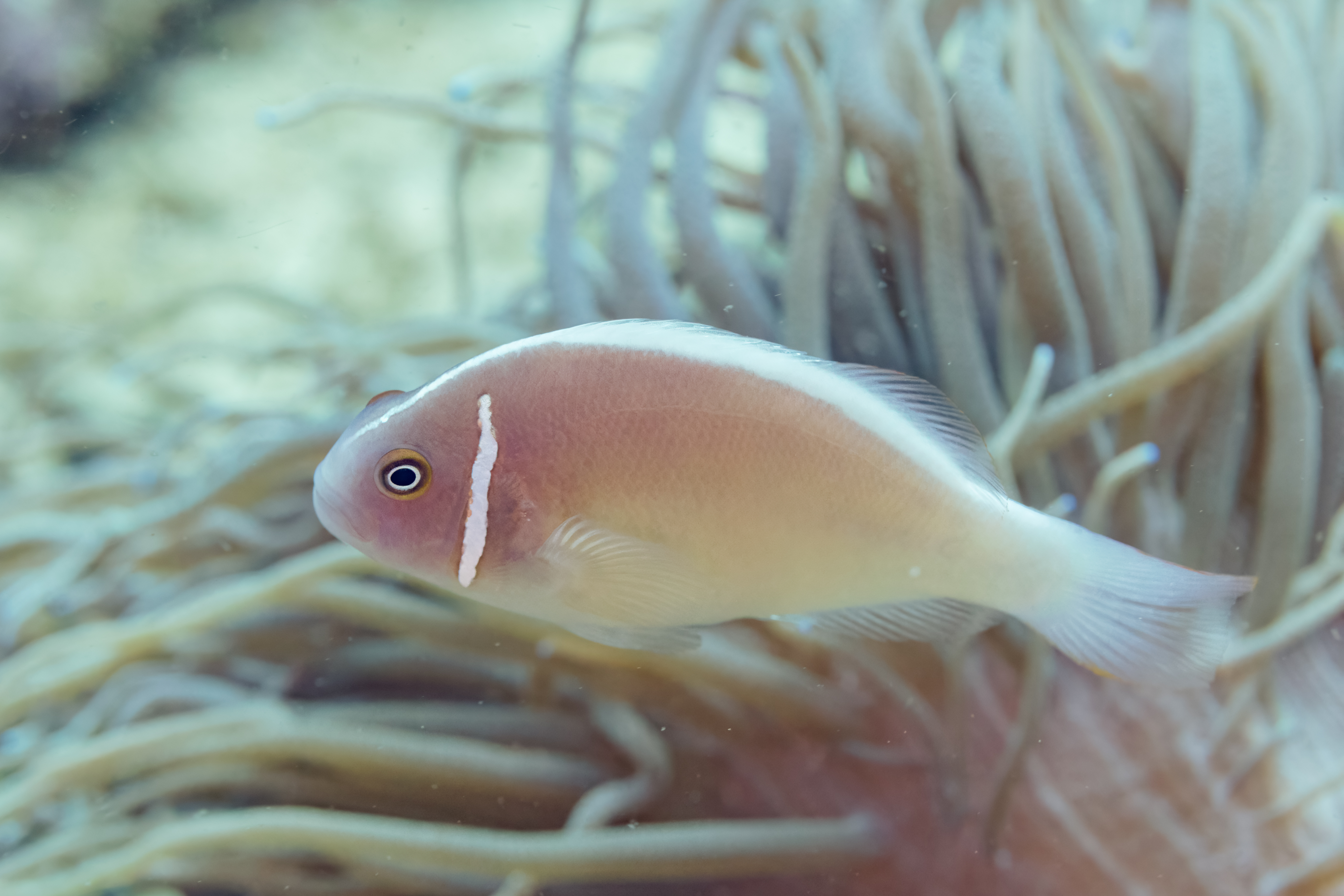

Conservation status
- Least Concern (IUCN 3.1)

Scientific classification
- Kingdom: Animalia
- Phylum: Chordata
- Class: Actinopterygii
- Division: Teleostei
- Order: Blenniiformes
- Family: Pomacentridae
- Genus: Amphiprion
- Species: A. perideraion

Binomial name
- Amphiprion perideraion Bleeker, 1855

= Pink skunk clownfish =

Species of fish

The pink skunk clownfish (Amphiprion perideraion), also known as the pink anemonefish, is a species of anemonefish that is widespread from northern Australia through the Malay Archipelago and Melanesia. Like all anemonefishes, it forms a symbiotic mutualism with sea anemones and is unaffected by the stinging tentacles of the host. It is a sequential hermaphrodite with a strict size-based dominance hierarchy; the female is largest, the breeding male is second largest, and the male nonbreeders get progressively smaller as the hierarchy descends. They exhibit protandry, meaning the breeding male changes to female if the sole breeding female dies, with the largest nonbreeder becoming the breeding male.

== Description ==
The body of A. perideraion is pink to peach. It has the white stripe along the dorsal ridge that is common to all members of the skunk complex and a white head bar running vertically just behind the eye. While the largest species of anemonefish can reach a length of 18 cm (7.1 in), A. perideraion is one of the smallest species, with females growing to a length of 10 cm (3.9 in).

=== Color variations ===
Some anemonefish species have color variations based on geographic location, sex, and host anemone. A. perideraion, like other members of the skunk complex, does not show any of these variations.

=== Similar species ===
A. perideraion is included in the skunk complex, so has similarities with other species in this complex. The combination of dorsal stripe and head bar distinguishes it from most other species. A. akallopisos, A. sandaracinos, and A. pacificus all lack a white head bar, while A. nigripes lacks the dorsal stripe and has black belly and black pelvic and anal fins. The hybrid A. leucokranos has a broader head bar and the dorsal stripe does not extend the full length of the dorsal ridge.

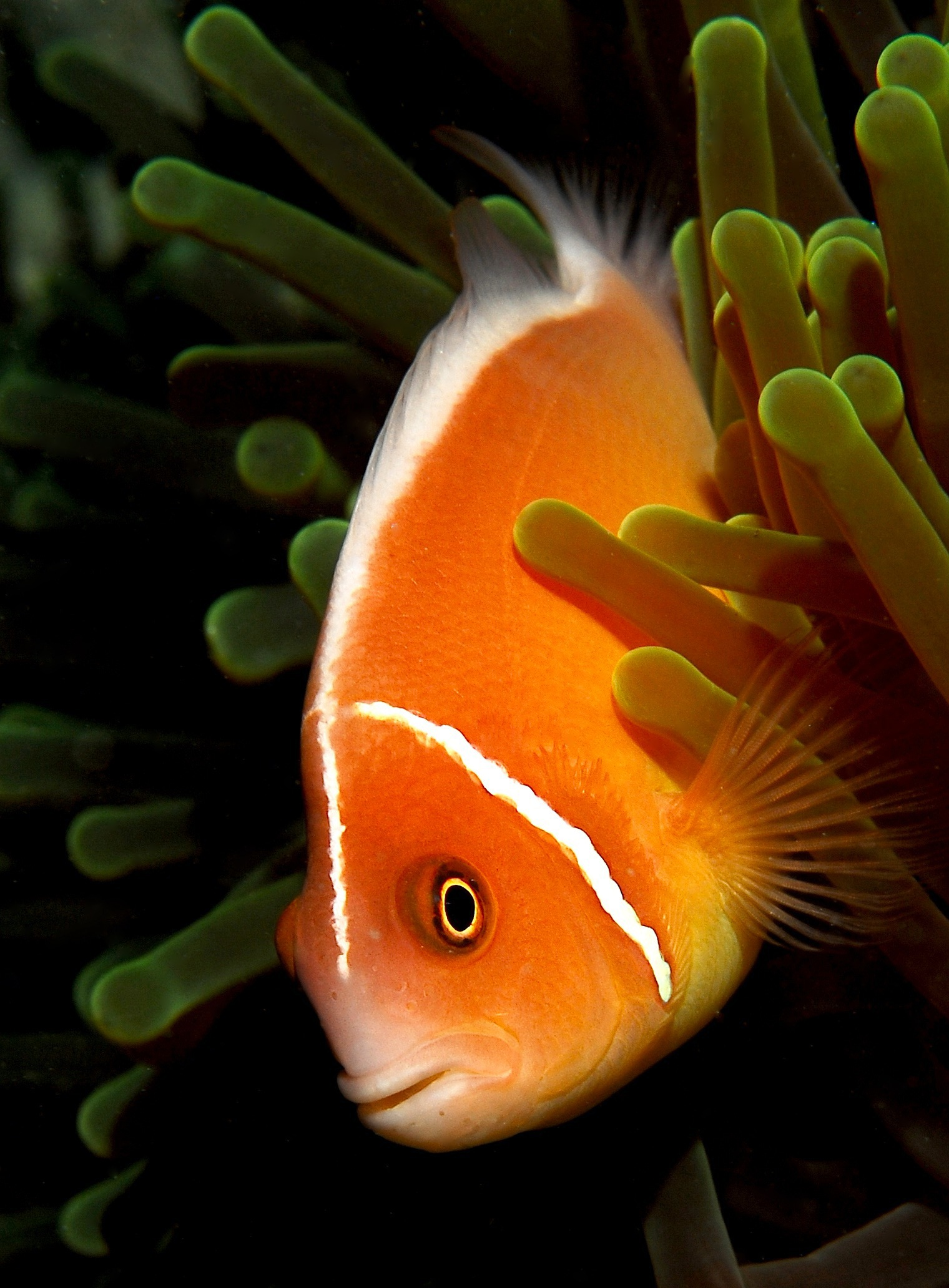
A. perideraion showing the distinctive narrow head bar and dorsal stripe

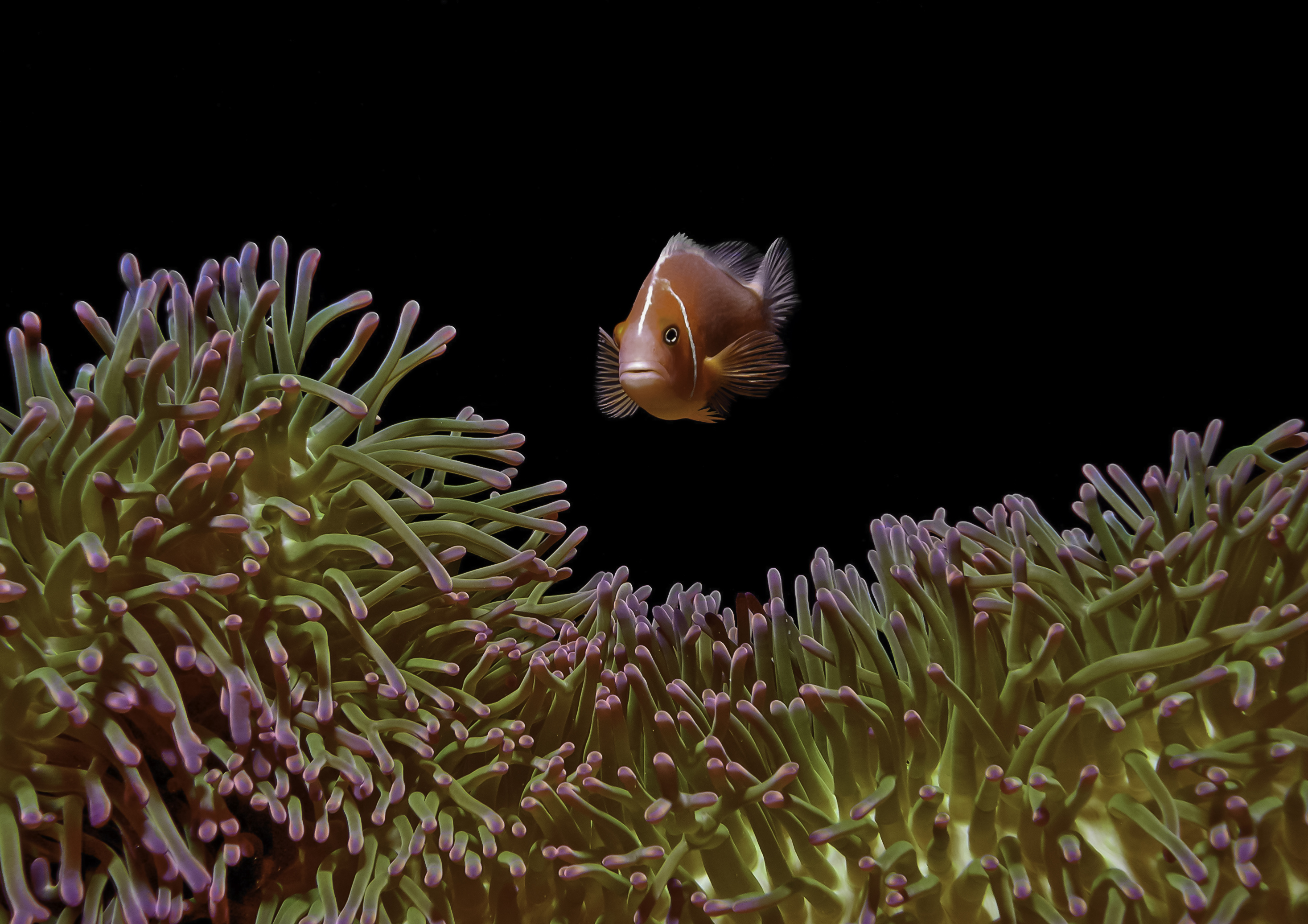
A. perideraion hovering above purple-tip anemone

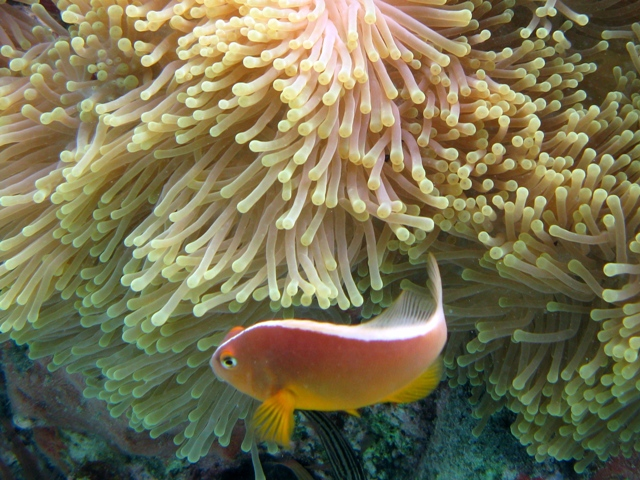
A. akallopisos (skunk anemonefish) lacks a white head bar.

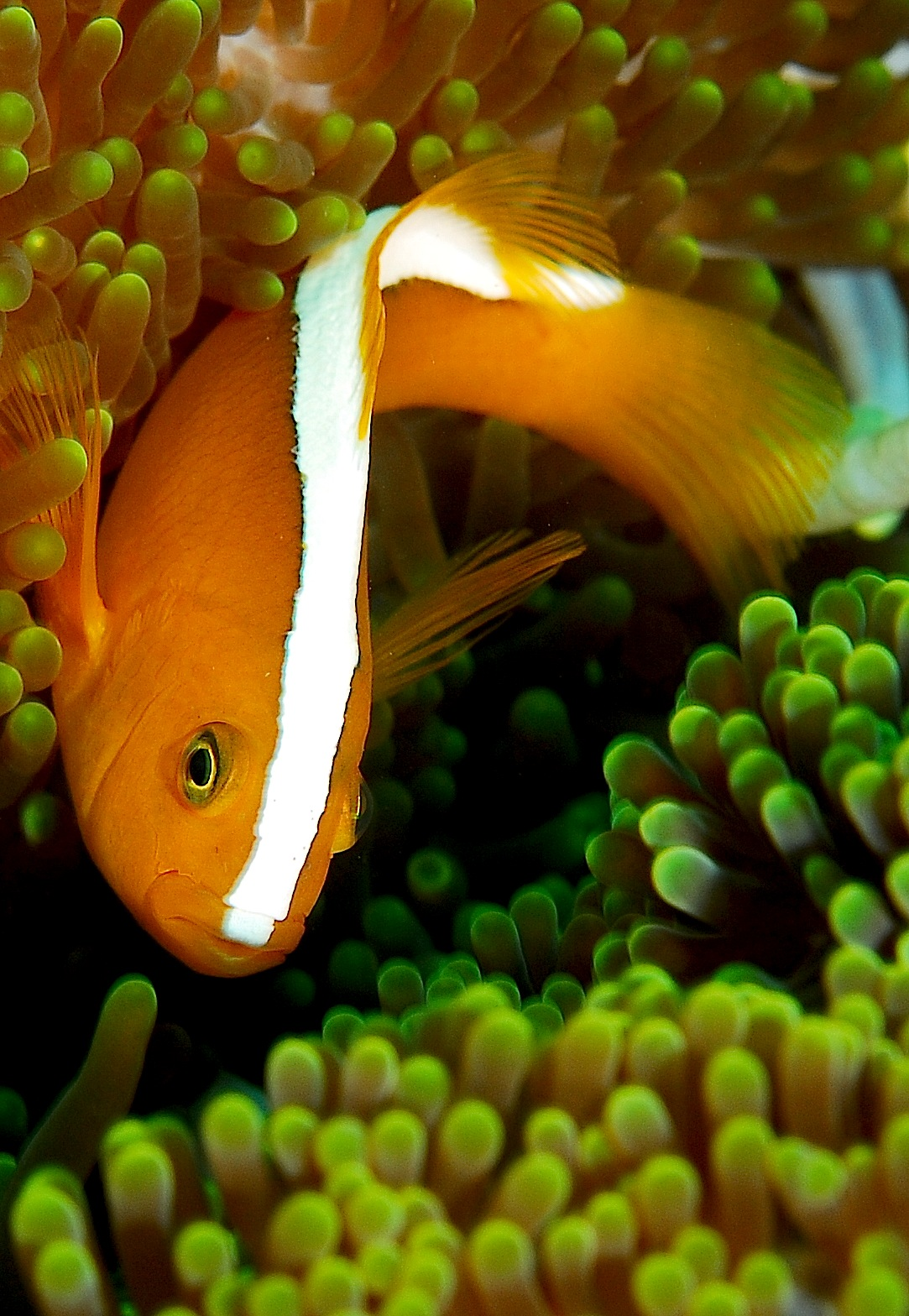
A. sandaracinos (orange anemonefish) lacks a white head bar.

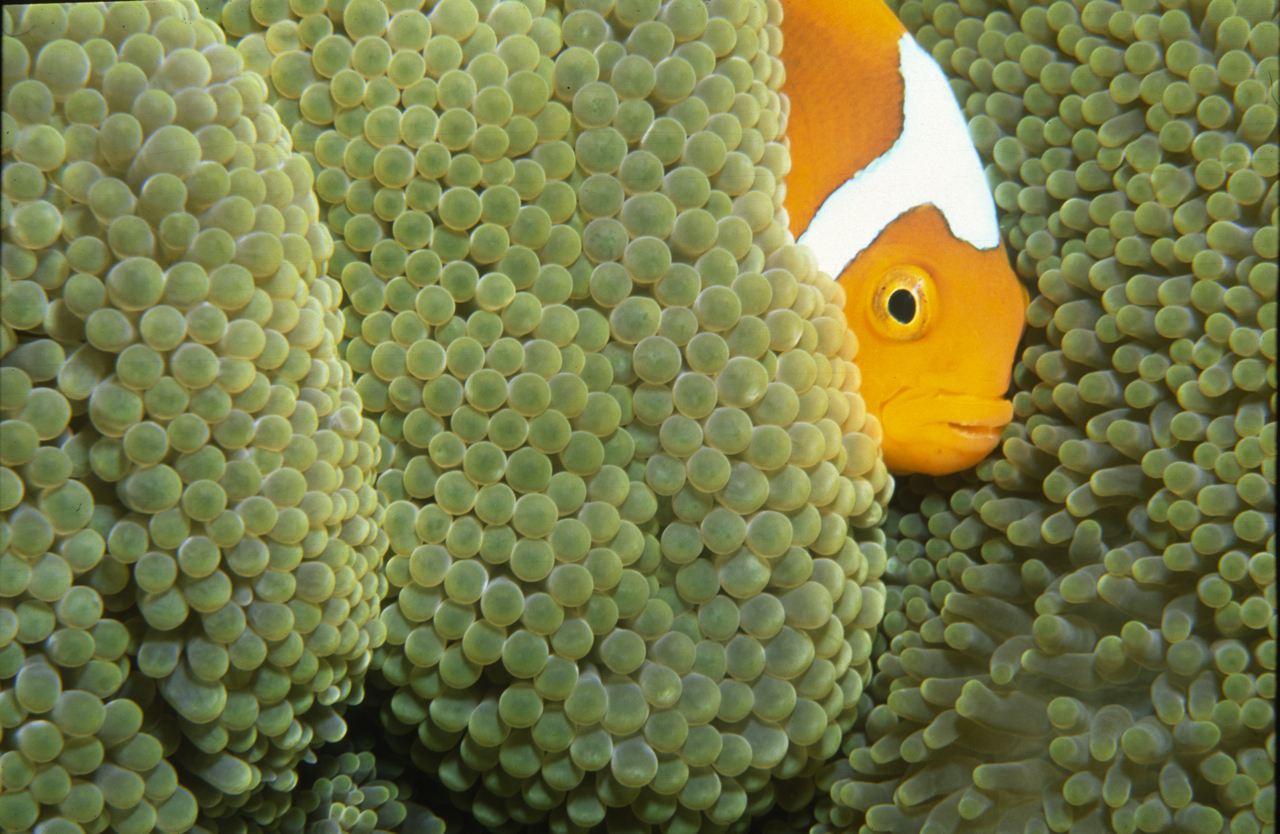
The hybrid A. leucokranos has a white bonnet that does not extend the length of the dorsal ridge.

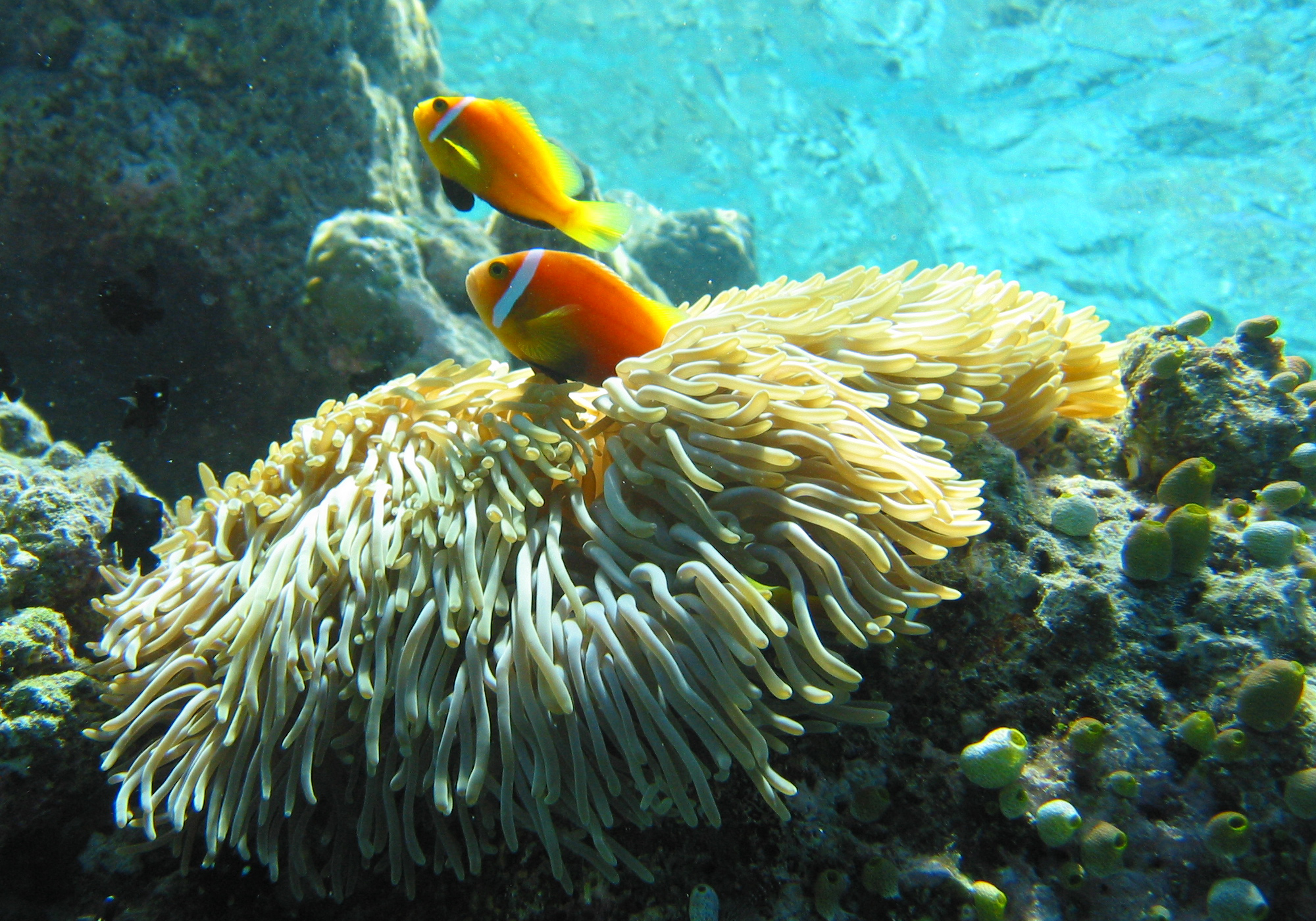
A. nigripes (Maldive anemonefish) lacks the dorsal strip and has a black belly, pelvic and anal fins.

== Distribution and habitat ==
A. perideraion is found throughout the Malay Archipelago and Melanesia, in the west Pacific Ocean from the Great Barrier Reef and Tonga, north to the Ryukyu Islands of Japan and in the eastern Indian Ocean from Ningaloo Reef, Western Australia, through the Rowley Shoals, Scott and Ashmore Reefs, Cocos and Christmas Islands to Sumatra. It inhabits reef lagoons and outer reef slopes. A. perideraion has been thought to be found at depths of 3–20 m, but surveys using autonomous underwater vehicles of mesophotic reefs at Viper Reef and Hydrographers Passage in the central Great Barrier Reef observed A. perideraion at depths between 50 and 65 m. A. perideraion and A. clarkii are the only anemonefish found on both the east and west coasts of Australia.

While the morphological features of A. perideraion are consistent throughout its range, genetic analysis of fish in the Indo-Malay Archipelago has shown a genetic break between the Java Sea population (Karimun Java) and all other locations. A north-to-south connection exists from the Philippines to the rest of the archipelago and a mixing of central populations along the strong current of the Indonesian throughflow.

=== Host anemones ===
The relationship between anemonefish and their host sea anemones is not random and instead is highly nested in structure. A. perideraion is a generalist, consistent with its widespread distribution, being hosted by the following four of the 10 host anemones:

- Heteractis crispa sebae anemone
- Heteractis magnifica magnificent sea anemone (usually)
- Macrodactyla doreensis long-tentacle anemone
- Stichodactyla gigantea giant carpet anemone

Unusually for anemonefish, A. perideraion has been observed sharing a host with other species, including A. clarkii and A. akallopisos.

=== Diet ===
The natural diet of anemonefish includes zooplankton, (diatoms and copepods), benthic worms, tunicates, and algae. A. perideraion is the only species of anemonefish to primarily feed on algae.

== Conservation status ==
Anemonefish and their host anemones are found on coral reefs and face similar environmental issues. Like corals, anemones contain intracellular endosymbionts, zooxanthellae, and can suffer from bleaching due to triggers such as increased water temperature or acidification. Local populations and genetic diversity remain vulnerable to high level of exploitation of these species and their host anemones by the global ornamental fish trade. This species was not evaluated in the 2012 release of the IUCN Red List.

== In aquaria ==
It has successfully been bred in an aquarium. In an aquarium, hobbyists have fed the species brine shrimp, mysis shrimp, chopped shellfish, and dried algae.

== Gallery ==
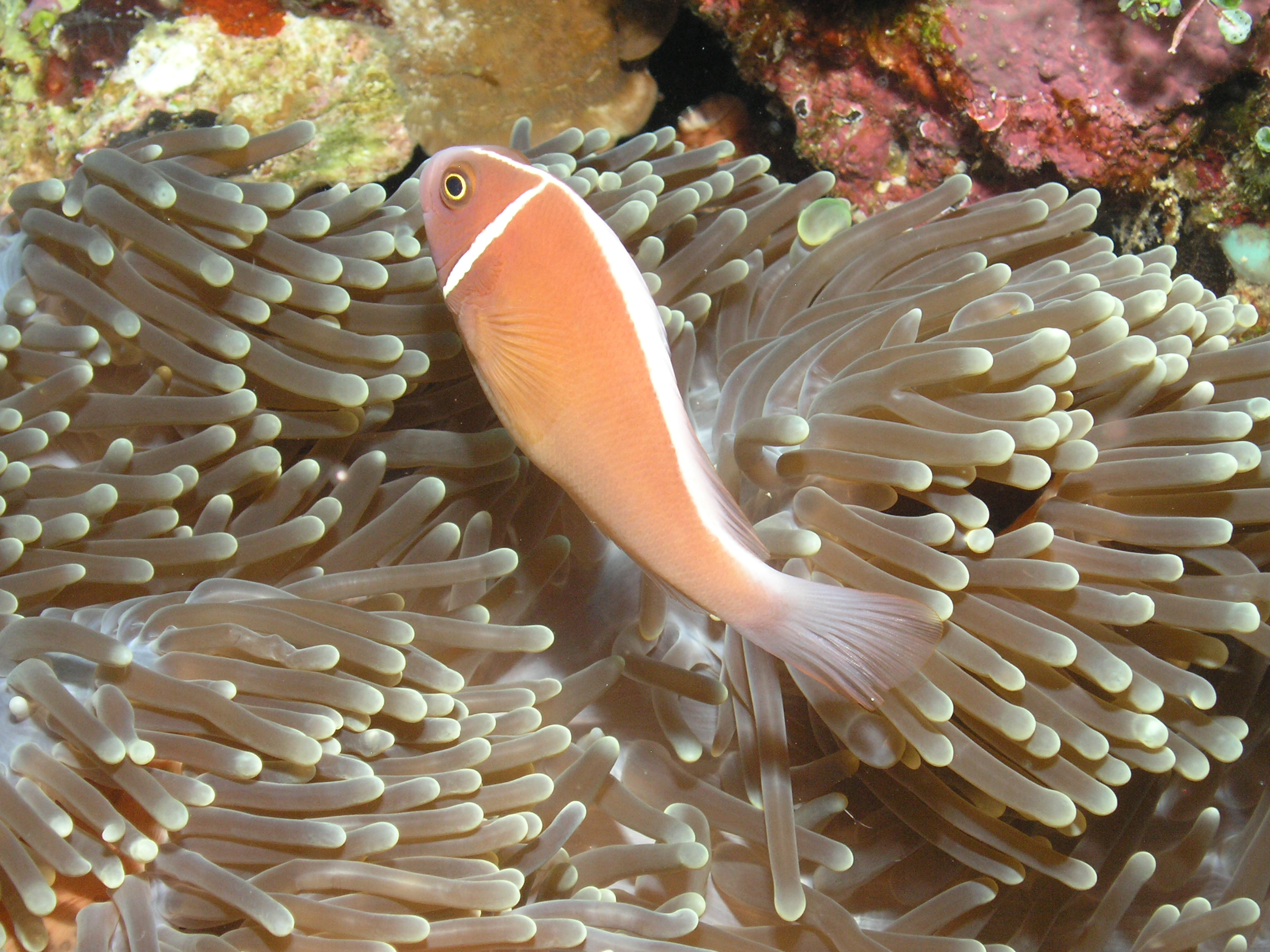
Pink anemonefish at Bunaken National Park, Indonesia

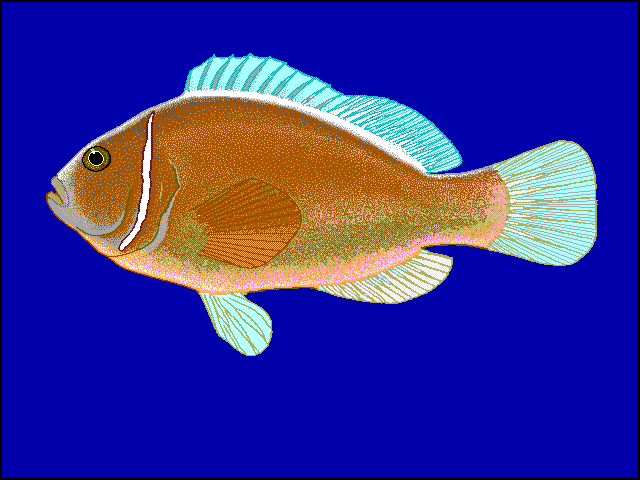
A. perideraion

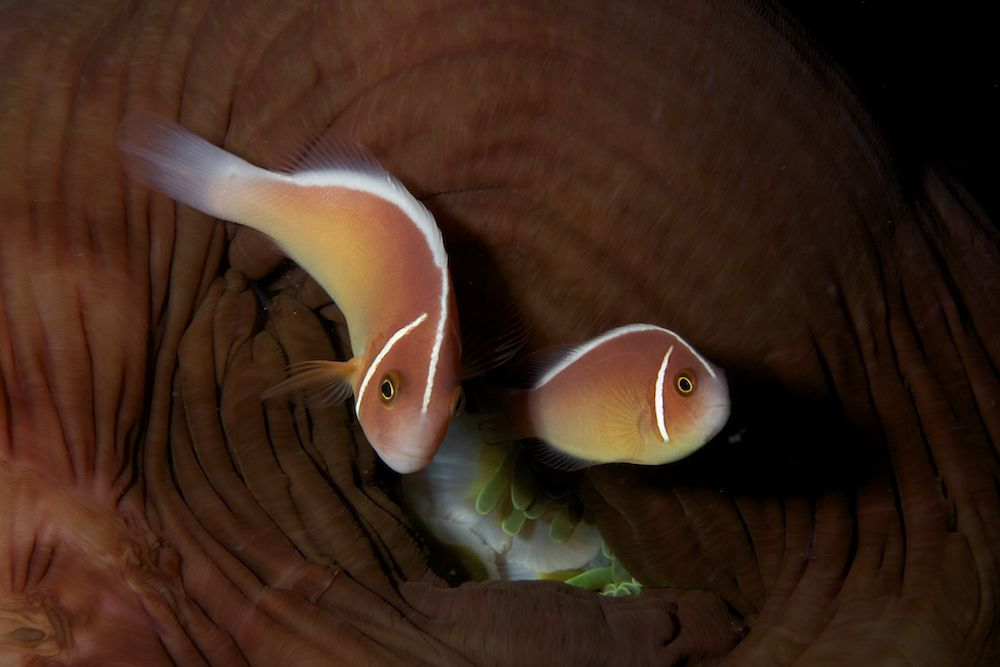
Two pink skunk clownfish (A. perideraion) and their closed host anemone, in Komodo

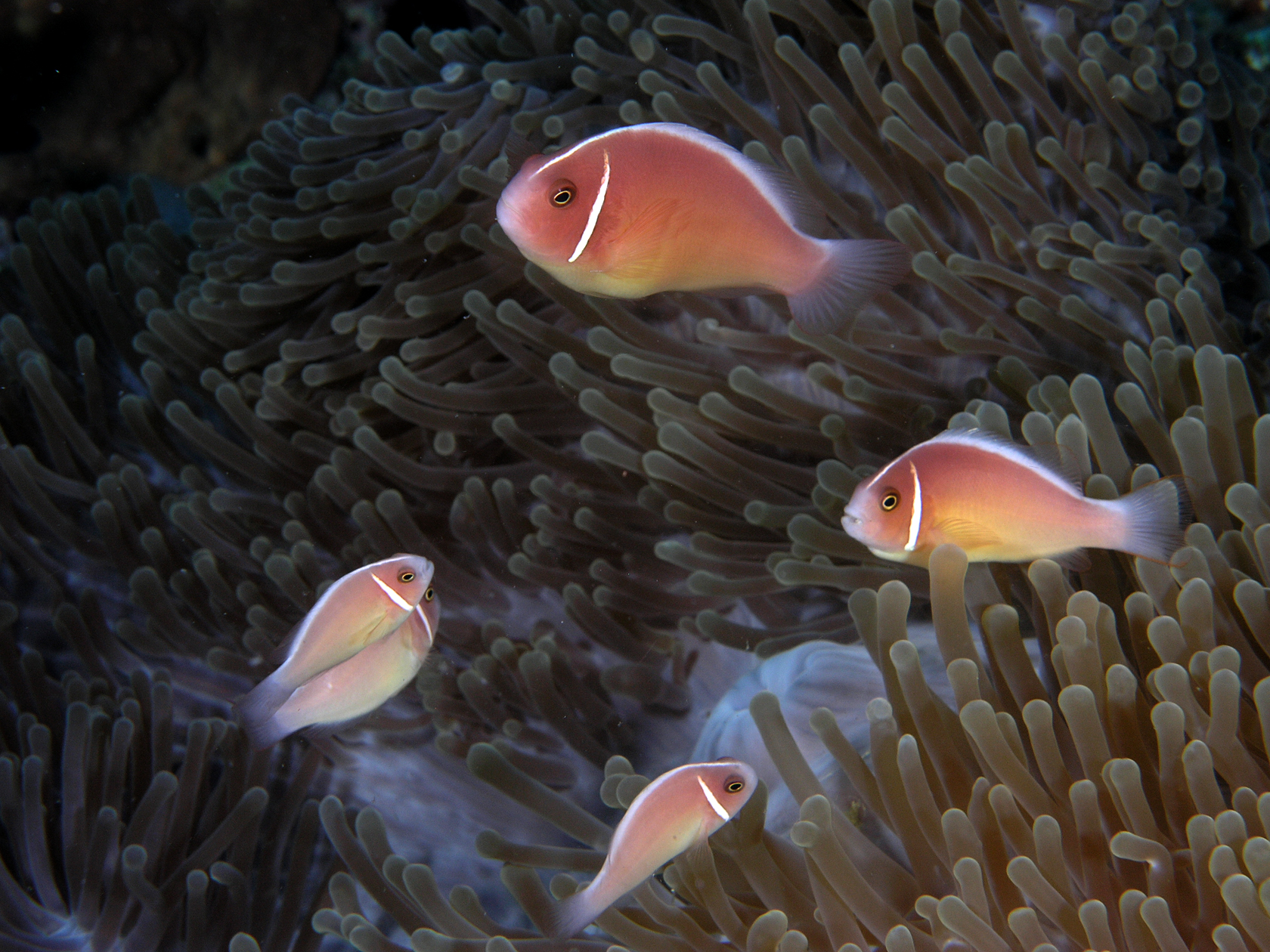
Several A. perideraion at Komodo

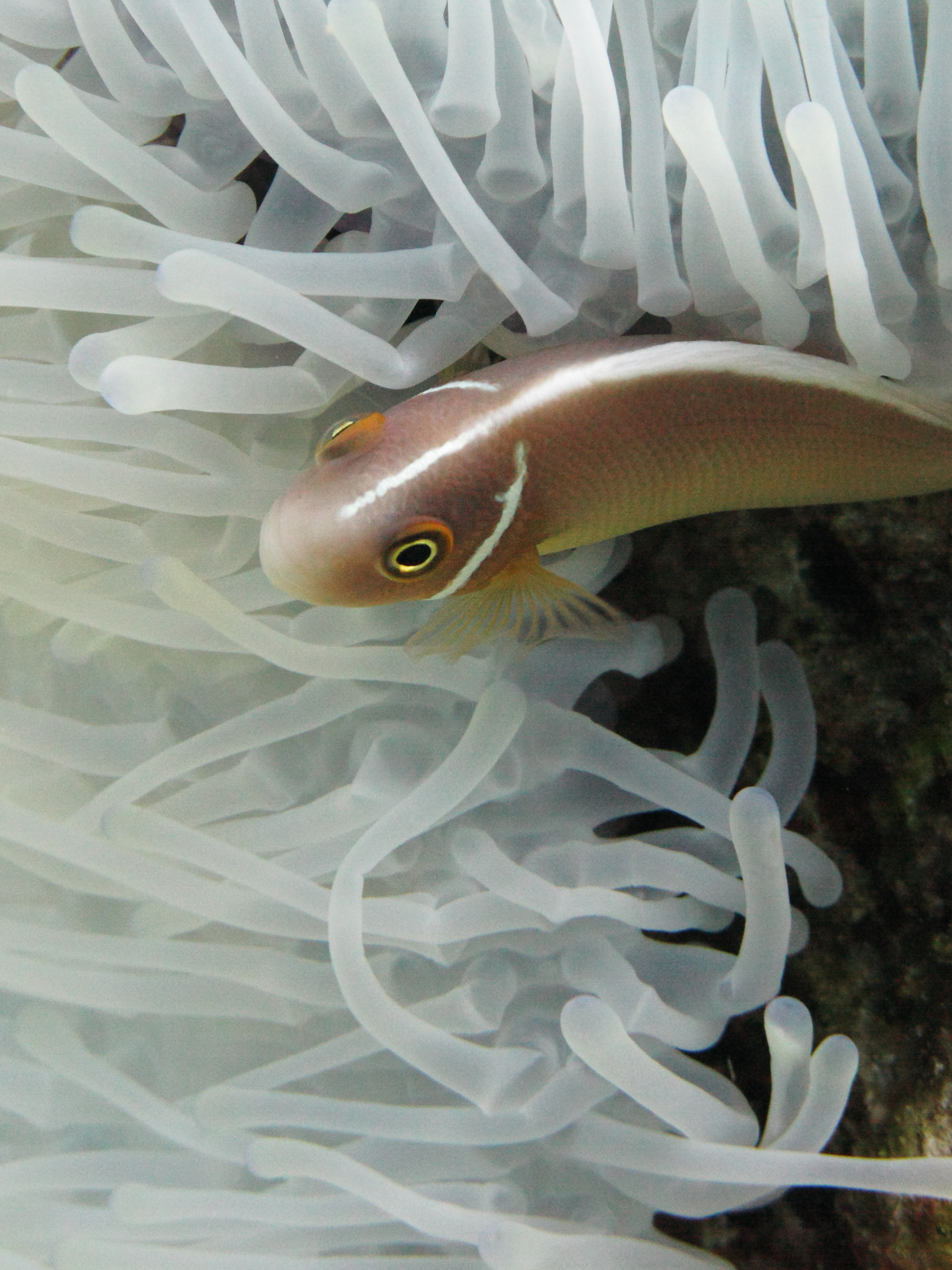
A. perideraion in a bleached anemone near Batu Moncho

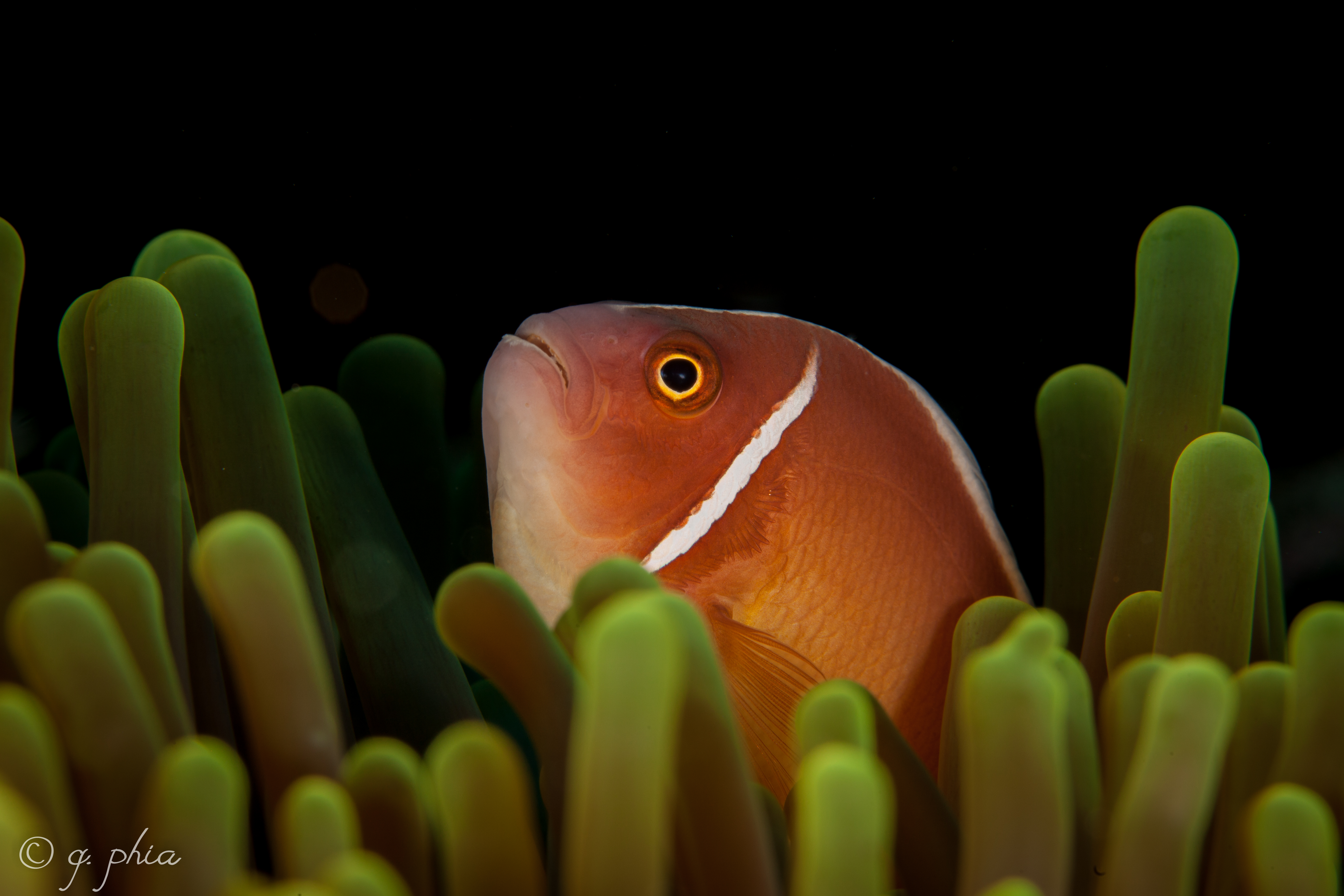
Pink anemonefish at Wakatobi National Park, Indonesia
