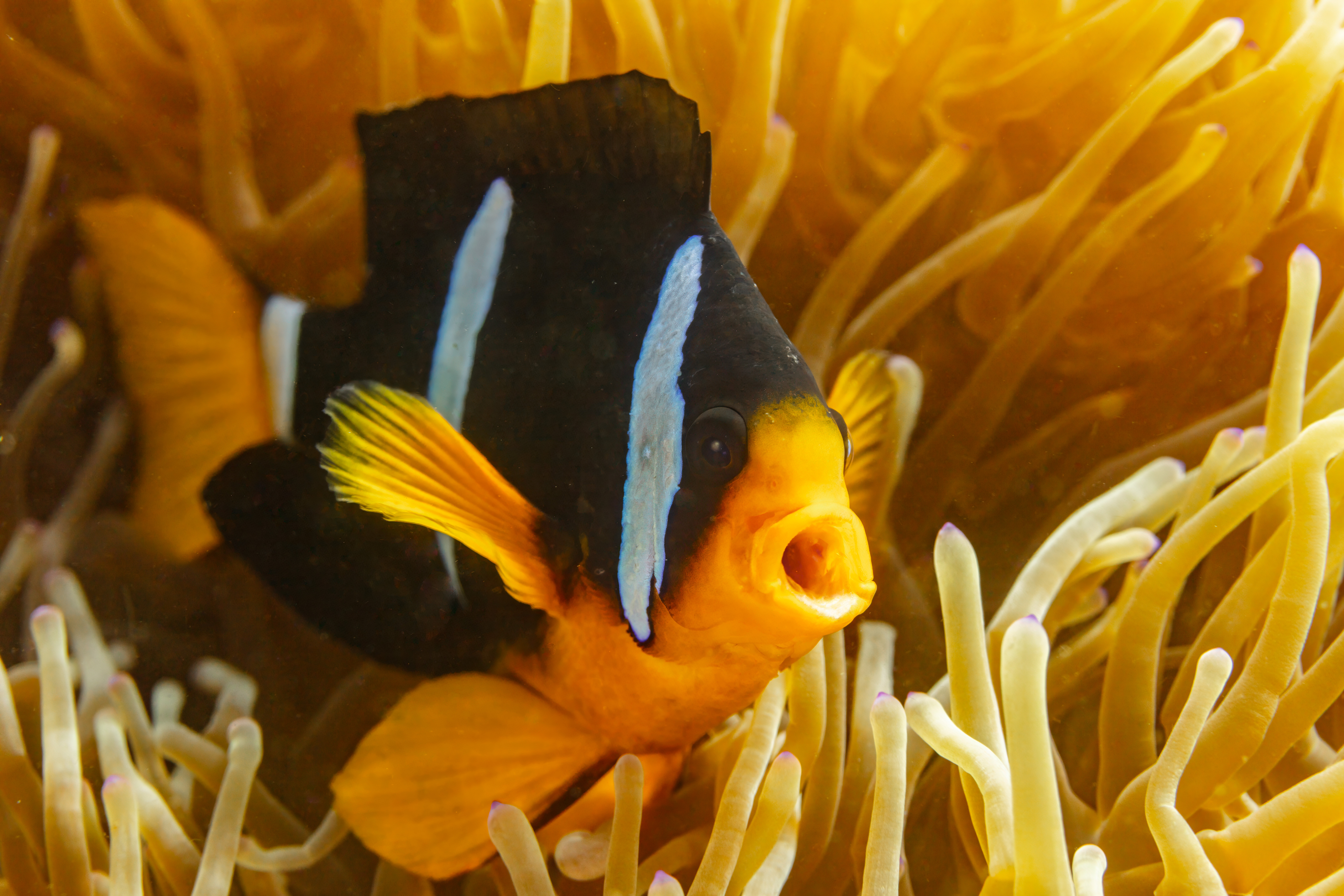
- Clark's anemonefish with sea anemone (Radianthus magnifica)

Conservation status
- Least Concern (IUCN 3.1)(Global)

- Endangered (IUCN 3.1) (Persian Gulf)

Scientific classification
- Kingdom: Animalia
- Phylum: Chordata
- Class: Actinopterygii
- Division: Teleostei
- Order: Blenniiformes
- Family: Pomacentridae
- Genus: Amphiprion
- Species: A. clarkii

Binomial name
- Amphiprion clarkii (J. W. Bennett, 1830)

Synonyms
- List: Anthias clarkii Bennett, 1830; Amphiprion clarkia (Bennett, 1830); Amphiprion xanthurus Cuvier, 1830; Sparus milii Bory de Saint-Vincent, 1831; Amphiprion melanostolus Richardson, 1842; Amphiprion japonicus Temminck & Schlegel, 1843; Amphiprion boholensis Cartier, 1874; Amphiprion papuensis Macleay, 1883; Amphiprion snyderi Ishikawa, 1904

= Clark's anemonefish =

Species of fish

Clark's anemonefish (Amphiprion clarkii), also known as the yellowtail clownfish, is a marine fish belonging to the family Pomacentridae, the clownfishes and damselfishes. 28 species of anemonefish live within the Pomacentridae family (Steer P. 2012).

== Characteristics of anemonefish ==
Clownfish or anemonefish are fishes that, in the wild, form symbiotic mutualisms with sea anemones and are unaffected by the stinging tentacles of the host anemone, see Amphiprioninae § Mutualism. The sea anemone protects the clownfish from predators, as well as providing food through the scraps left from the anemone's meals and occasional dead anemone tentacles. In return, the clownfish defends the anemone from its predators, and parasites. Anemonefish tend to have a life span of about 10-11 years when accounting for a predictable environment that does not experience much change in water temperature, increase in predation or habitat degradation (Lakshmi Sawitri). Clownfish are small-sized, 10–18 centimetres (3.9–7.1 in), and depending on species, they are overall yellow, orange, or a reddish or blackish color, and many show white bars or patches. Within species there may be color variations, most commonly according to distribution, but also based on sex, age and host anemone. Clownfish are found in warmer waters of the Indian and Pacific oceans and the Red Sea in sheltered reefs or in shallow lagoons.

In a group of clownfish, there is a strict dominance hierarchy. The largest and most aggressive fish is female and is found at the top. Only two clownfish, a male and a female, in a group reproduce through external fertilization. Clownfish are sequential hermaphrodites, meaning that they develop into males first, and when they mature, they become females. They are not aggressive. When the egg production and spawning patterns of eight breeding pairs were observed in a coral reef off the coast of the Philippines, they preferred breeding in the colder months. A trend of a peak breeding season from November through May was seen; egg production increased up to the new moon and decreased after the full moon. This seasonality of spawning is comparable to other species of clownfish that live in temperate regions.

== Description ==
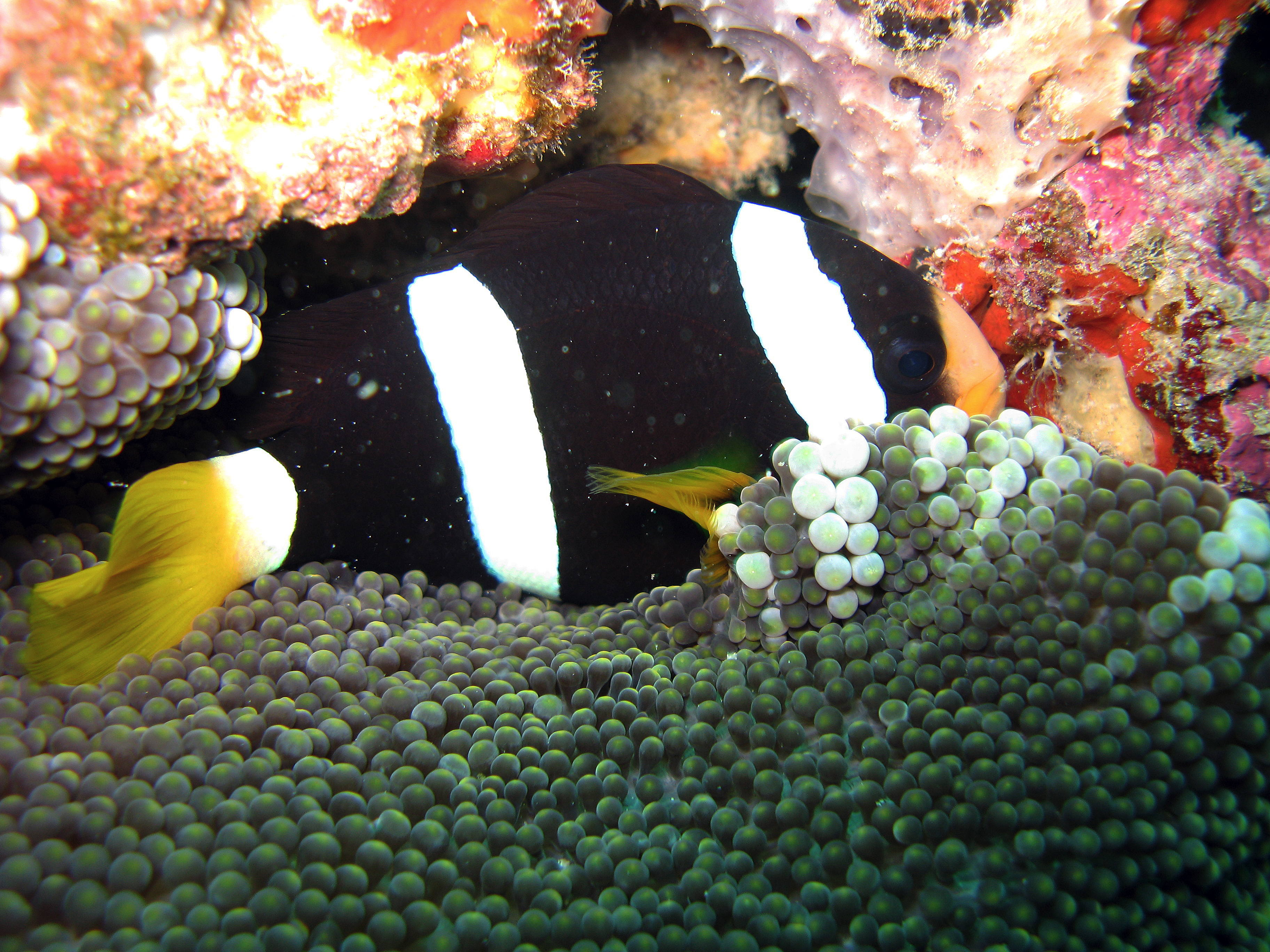
melanistic variation with Stichodactyla haddoni

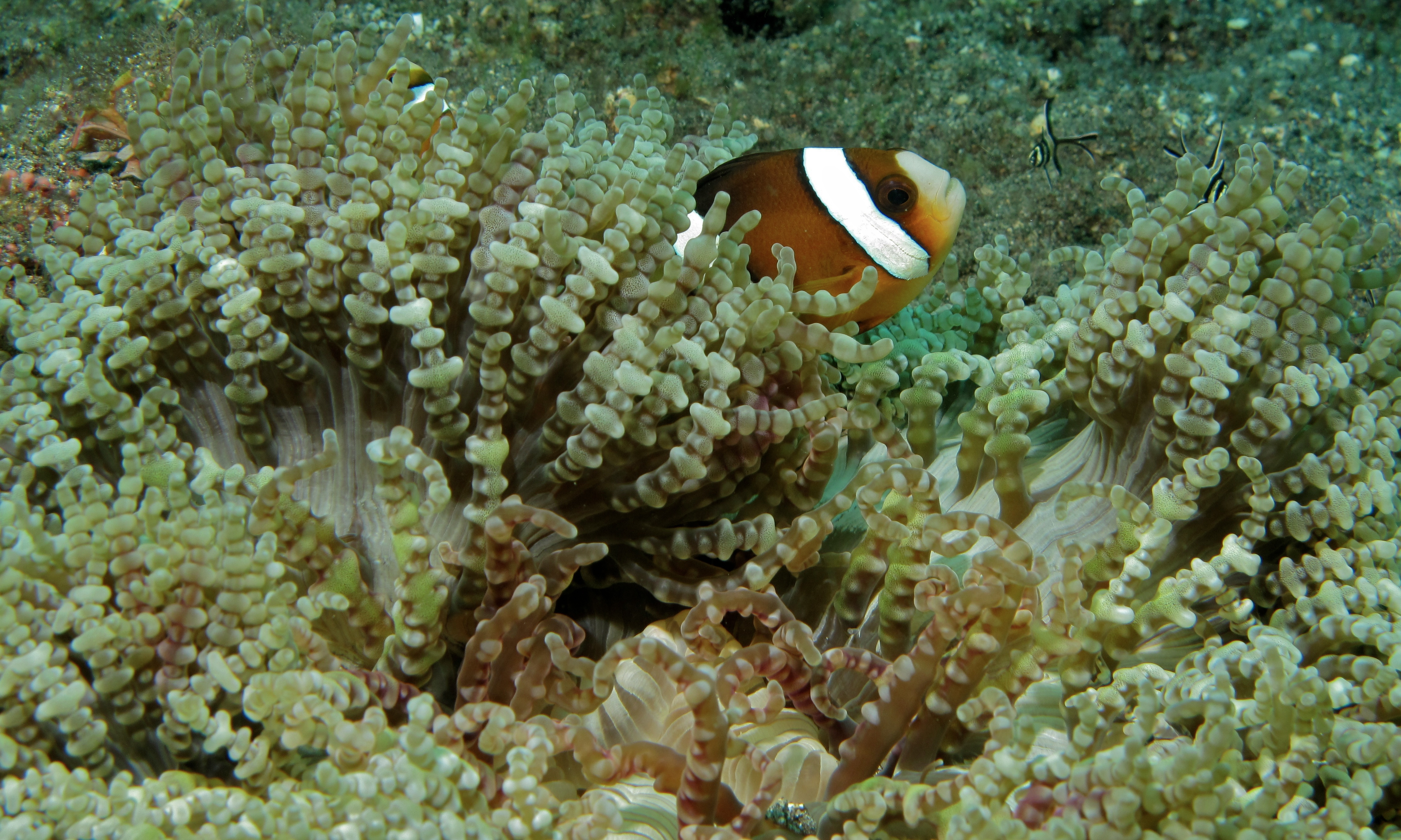
Clark's anemonefish in beaded sea anemone

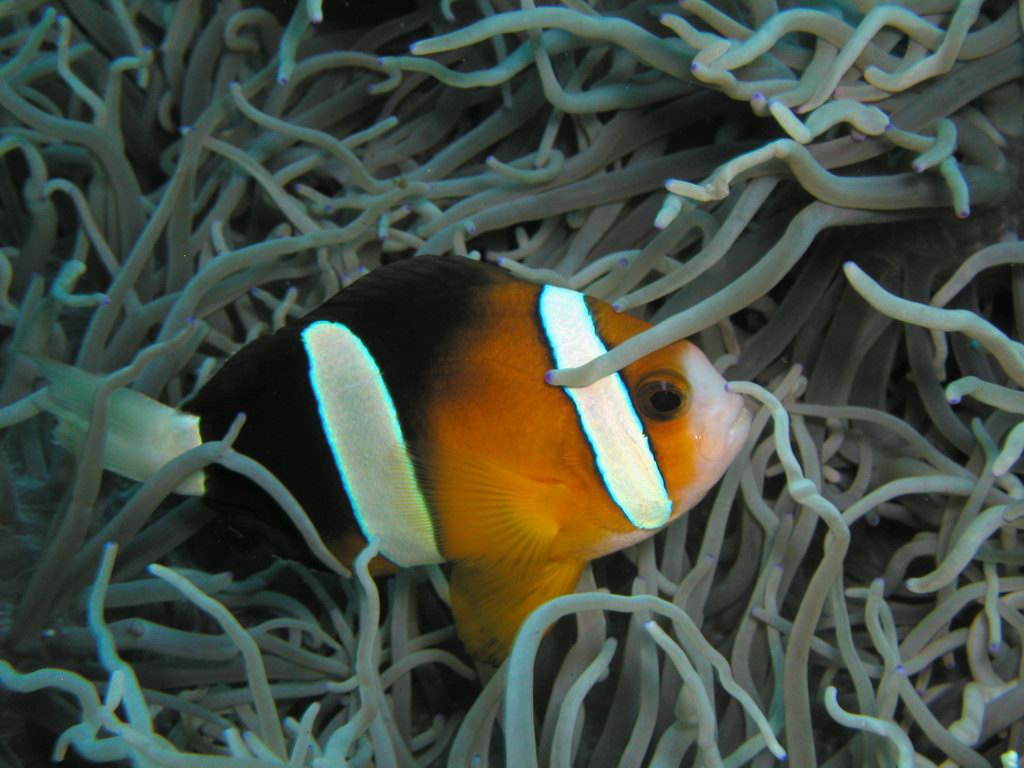
Orange and black variation

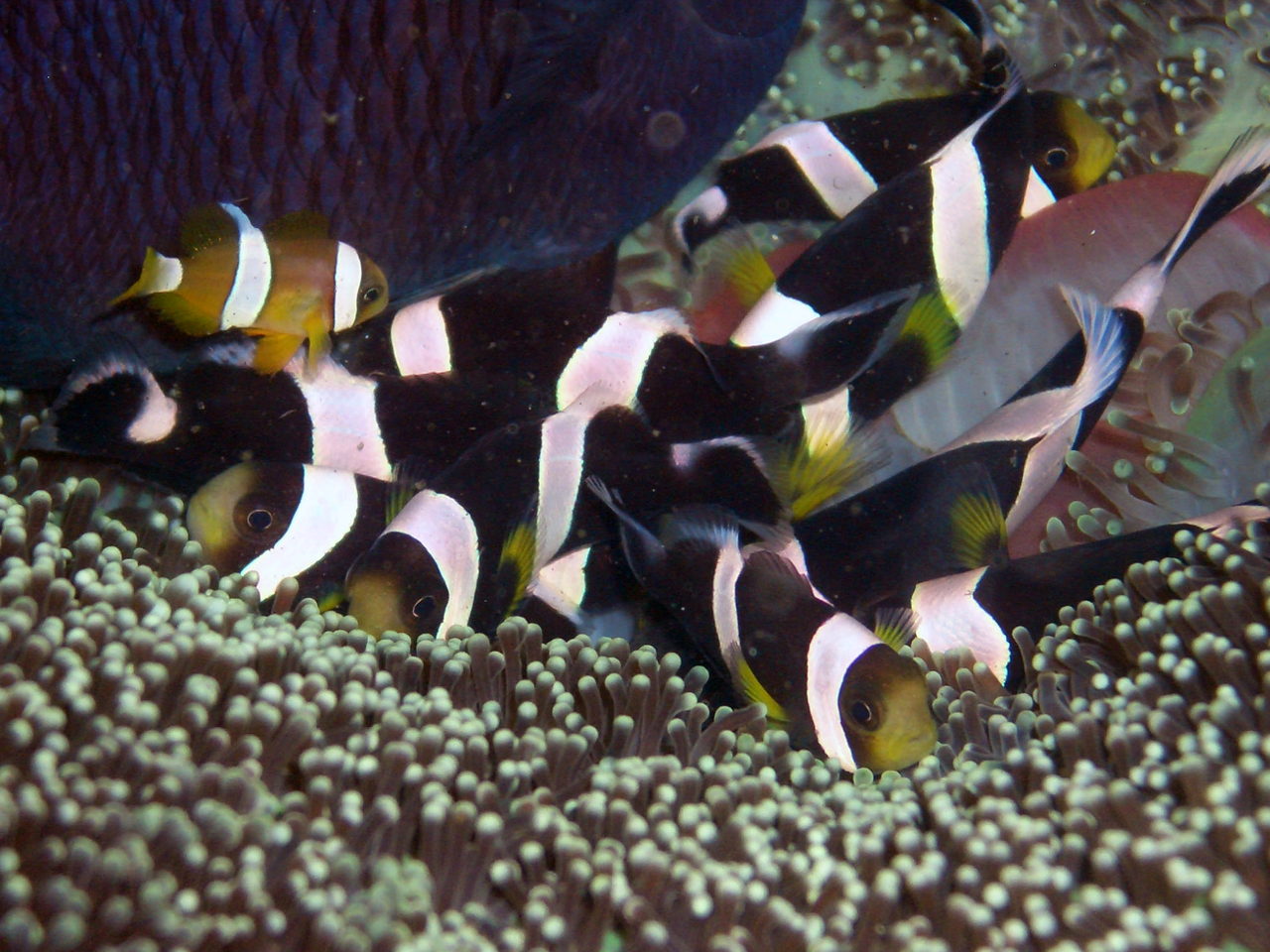
Juvenile color variation

Clark's anemonefish is a small-sized fish which grows up to 10 cm (4 in) as a male and 15 cm (5 7/8 in) as a female. It is stocky, laterally compressed, and oval to rounded.

It is colorful, with vivid black, white, and yellow stripes, though the exact pattern shows considerable geographical variation. Usually it is black dorsally and orange-yellow ventrally, the black areas becoming wider with age. There are two vertical white bands, one behind the eye and one above the anus, and the caudal peduncle is white. The snout is orange or pinkish. The dorsal and caudal fins are orange-yellow, and the caudal fin is generally lighter in tone than the rest of the body, sometimes becoming whitish.

=== Color variations ===
Clark's anemonefish shows the greatest color variations of any anemonefish, with variations based on location, sex, age and host anemone. Adults in Vanuatu and New Caledonia are orange-yellow with two vertical white bands. Sex related color differences may be present, such as the female having a white caudal fin and the male having a yellow caudal fin. Juveniles are orange-yellow with vertical white bands. Fish living with the host anemone Stichodactyla mertensii, Mertens' carpet sea anemone are frequently black except for the snout bars and tail.

=== Similar species of Amphiprion ===
The caudal fin is forked and the base lacks a white bar on A. latifasciatus. The caudal fin lacks the sharp demarcation between white and dark and the mid-body bar is narrower on A. allardi and A. akindynos. The caudal fin is dark on A. chrysogaster, A. fuscocaudatus and A. tricinctus.

== Distribution and habitat ==
Clark's anemonefish is the most widely distributed anemonefish, being found in tropical waters from the Indian Ocean to the Western Pacific. These anemonefish most commonly occupy reef biomes at 1 to 60 meters in areas with host anemones (Moore, Billy).

=== Host anemones ===
Clark's anemonefish is the least host specific anemonefish, living in association with all ten species of sea anemones that host anemonefish:

- Cryptodendrum adhaesivum
- Entacmaea quadricolor Bubble-tip anemone
- Heteractis aurora beaded sea anemone
- Heteractis crispa Sebae anemone
- Heteractis magnifica magnificent sea anemone
- Heteractis malu delicate sea anemone
- Macrodactyla doreensis long tentacle anemone
- Stichodactyla gigantea giant carpet anemone
- Stichodactyla haddoni
- Stichodactyla mertensii Mertens' carpet sea anemone

== Etymology ==
The specific name and the common name both honour the Scottish engraver John Heaviside Clark (1771–1836) who provided illustrations for Bennett's A Selection from the most remarkable and interesting Fishes found on the Coast of Ceylon, from drawings made in the Southern part of that Island.
