= Ritteri anemone =

Ritteri anemone is a common name for two species of sea anemone. It may refer to:

- Heteractis aurora
- Heteractis magnifica
