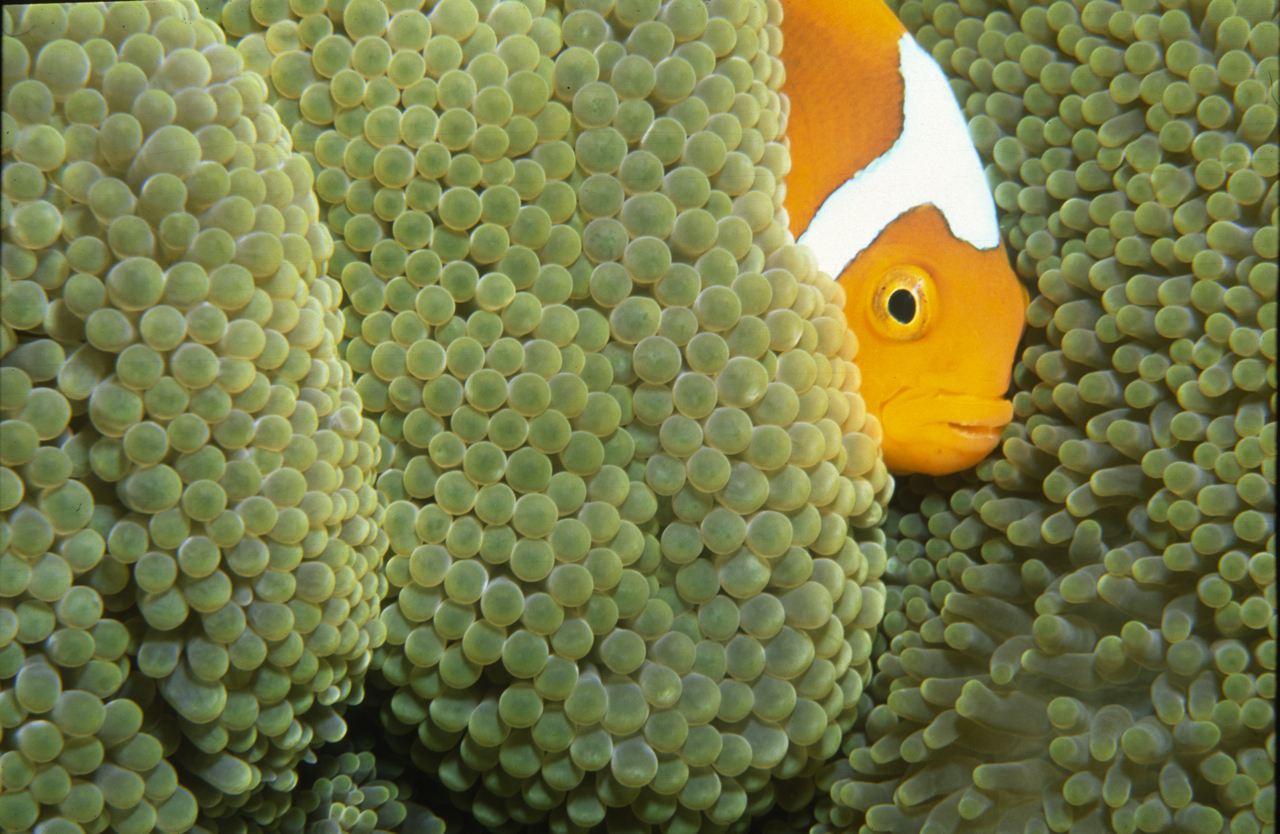

Conservation status
- Least Concern (IUCN 3.1)

Scientific classification
- Kingdom: Animalia
- Phylum: Chordata
- Class: Actinopterygii
- Division: Teleostei
- Order: Blenniiformes
- Family: Pomacentridae
- Genus: Amphiprion
- Species: A. leucokranos

Binomial name
- Amphiprion leucokranos Allen 1973

= Amphiprion leucokranos =

Species of fish

Amphiprion leucokranos, the white bonnet anemonefish, is a naturally occurring hybrid anemonefish found in the western central Pacific Ocean. Like all anemonefishes it forms a symbiotic mutualism with sea anemones and is unaffected by the stinging tentacles of the host anemone. It is a sequential hermaphrodite with a strict dominance hierarchy, features which are critical to the direction of gene flow.

== Description ==
The body of A. leucokranosis is orange or light brown and with a white head bar and a white mark on the top of its head, giving rise to its common name of white bonnet anemonefish. The head band may be continuous or not. They have 9 dorsal spines, 2 anal spines, 18-19 dorsal soft rays and 13-14 anal soft rays. They reach a maximum length of 11 cm (4 1/4 in).

== Hybridisation ==
There has been a long-standing theory that A. leucokranosis was a naturally occurring hybrid between A. chrysopterus and A. sandaracinos, with the fish being experimentally created in captivity. Its hybrid status was confirmed in 2015 with consistent ecological, morphological and genetic evidence.

In any group of anemonefish, there is a strict sized based dominance hierarchy: the female is largest, the breeding male is second largest, and the male non-breeders get progressively smaller as the hierarchy descends. They exhibit protandry, meaning the breeding male will change to female if the sole breeding female dies, with the largest non-breeder becomes the breeding male.

This strict sized based dominance hierarchy makes the relative size of the parent species critical in shaping the outcome of hybridization In this regard A. chrysopterus is one of the largest anemonefish, growing to 17 cm in length. while A. sandaracinos is significantly smaller growing up to 11 cm as a female and just 3 to 6.5 cm as a male. There is strong evidence, consistent with their relative size, of the larger A. chrysopterus always being the mother and unidirectional introgression of A. chrysopterus mitochondrial DNA into A. sandaracinos via hybrid backcrosses.

Parent species

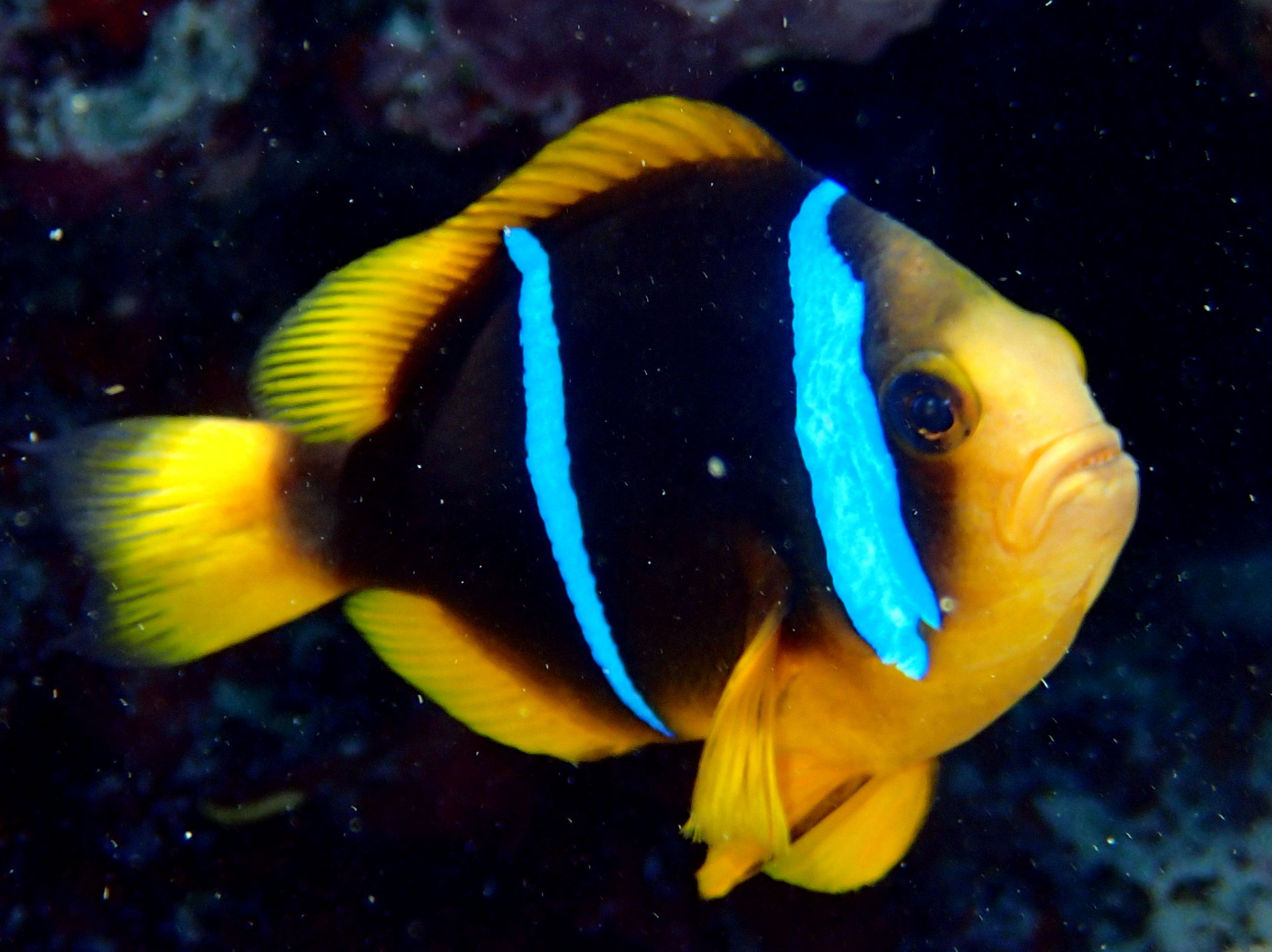
A. chrysopterus

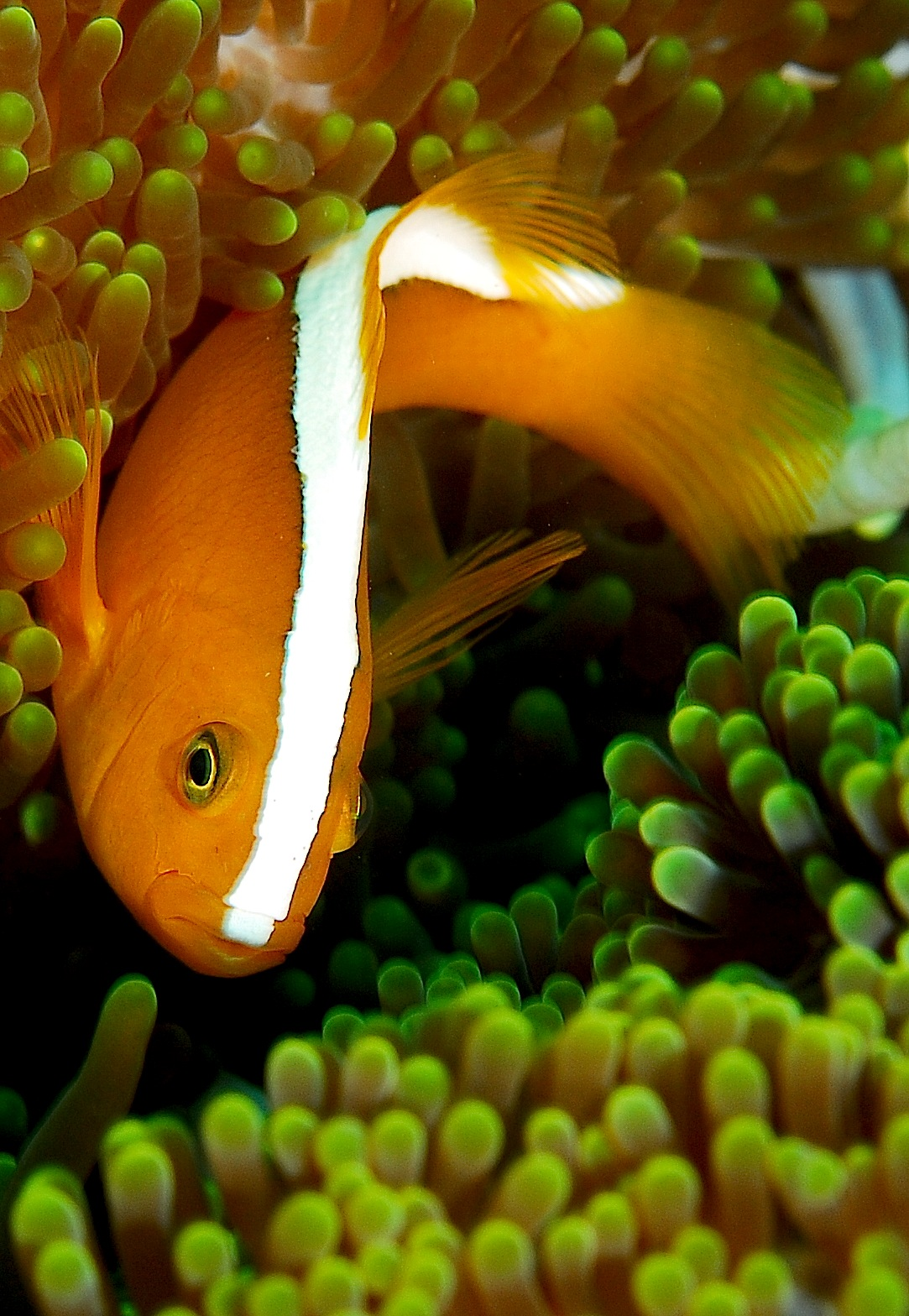
A. sandaracinos

=== Color variations ===
Being a hybrid A. leucokranosis shows a variety of colors and patterns, with the intermediate morphology of the typical F1 hybrid and backcrosses tending more towards the features of A. sandaracinos. It does not show any melanism when hosted by S. mertensii unlike some species of anemonefish, such as A. clarkii

=== Similar species ===
The white mark on top of the head is distinctive. The parent A. sandaracinos has a similar body color, however it has a white stripe on the dorsal ridge from the superior lip to the caudal fin and lacks the white bar on the side of the head.

== Distribution and habitat ==
Other constraints upon hybridization are overlap in distribution, depth and host anemone. A. leucokranos is found in the Western Central Pacific, on the north coast of New Guinea, including Manus Island, D'Entrecasteaux Islands and New Britain and the Solomon Islands, being the area where the distribution of A. chrysopterus and A. sandaracinos overlap. There is a substantial overlap in depth with all 3 fish found in the range of 1–10 m.

=== Host anemones ===
A. leucokranos is hosted by the following species of anemone:

- Heteractis crispa Sebae anemone
- Heteractis magnifica magnificent sea anemone
- Stichodactyla mertensii Mertens' carpet sea anemone

At Kimbe Bay A. leucokranos and its parents were primarily found in the host Stichodactyla mertensii otherwise Heteractis crispa.
