= Heteractis aurora =

Scientific classification
- Kingdom: Animalia
- Phylum: Cnidaria
- Subphylum: Anthozoa
- Class: Hexacorallia
- Order: Actiniaria
- Family: Heteractidae
- Genus: Heteractis
- Species: H. aurora

Binomial name
- Heteractis aurora (Quoy & Gaimard, 1833)

Synonyms
- List: Actinia aurora Quoy & Gaimard, 1833; Antheopsis koseirensis Klunzinger, 1877; Bartholomea sp. (Uchida 1975); Bunodes koseirensis Klunzinger, 1877; Ixalactis simplex Haddon, 1898; Radianthus koseirensis (Mariscal 1970, 1972); Radianthus koseiriensis (Klunzinger, 1877); Radianthus simplex (Haddon & Shackleton)

Species of sea anemone

Heteractis aurora is a species of sea anemone in the family Heteractidae.

== Taxonomy ==
Common names for H. aurora include beaded sea anemone, aurora host anemone, sand anemone, carpet anemone, flat anemone, corn anemone, Ritteri anemone, saddle tip anemone, adhesive sea anemone, and the white beaded anemone.

== Description ==
Both the tentacles and oral disc of H. aurora are brown or purplish. The tentacles reach 50 mm in length, may be sticky when touched, and can have tips of a magenta colouration. The longer tentacles contain swellings. These appear on only on a single side, or almost entirely surrounding the tentacle, giving the appearance of beads on a string. A maximum of 20 such swellings may occur on any single tentacle.

This species has a broad, flattened oral disc reaching 250 mm wide, and may have white or brown markings that radiate from the centre, and even continue up and along the tentacles.

== Distribution and habitat ==
H. aurora occurs in Micronesia as well as in Melanesia to East Africa. It is also present in the Red Sea, and in Australia to the Ryukyu Islands. This species lives among coral, and along rocky reef edges and on slopes, normally in areas with strong currents. They attach themselves to a surface, and remain partially buried in sediment or sand. When threatened, they may retract entirely out of view into the substrate.

== Ecology ==
H. aurora hosts 7 species of anemonefish as symbionts:

- Amphiprion akindynos – Barrier reef anemonefish
- A. allardi – Allard's anemonefish
- A. bicinctus – Two-band anemonefish
- A. clarkii - Clark's anemonefish
- A. chrysogaster - Mauritian anemonefish
- A. chrysopterus – Orange-fin anemonefish
- A. tricinctus – Three-band anemonefish

The relationship between anemonefish and their host sea anemones is highly nested in structure. With 7 species of hosted anemonefish, H. aurora is a generalist anemone, however it is considered a nursery anemone as, for reasons unknown, sexually mature fish are rarely hosted by H. aurora.

A number of other species are associated with H. aurora, however the relationship is commensal rather than mutual as the anemone does not appear to benefit from the association. These species are

- porcelain crabs
- Shrimp from the Periclimenes genus
- Threespot dascyllus

== Gallery ==
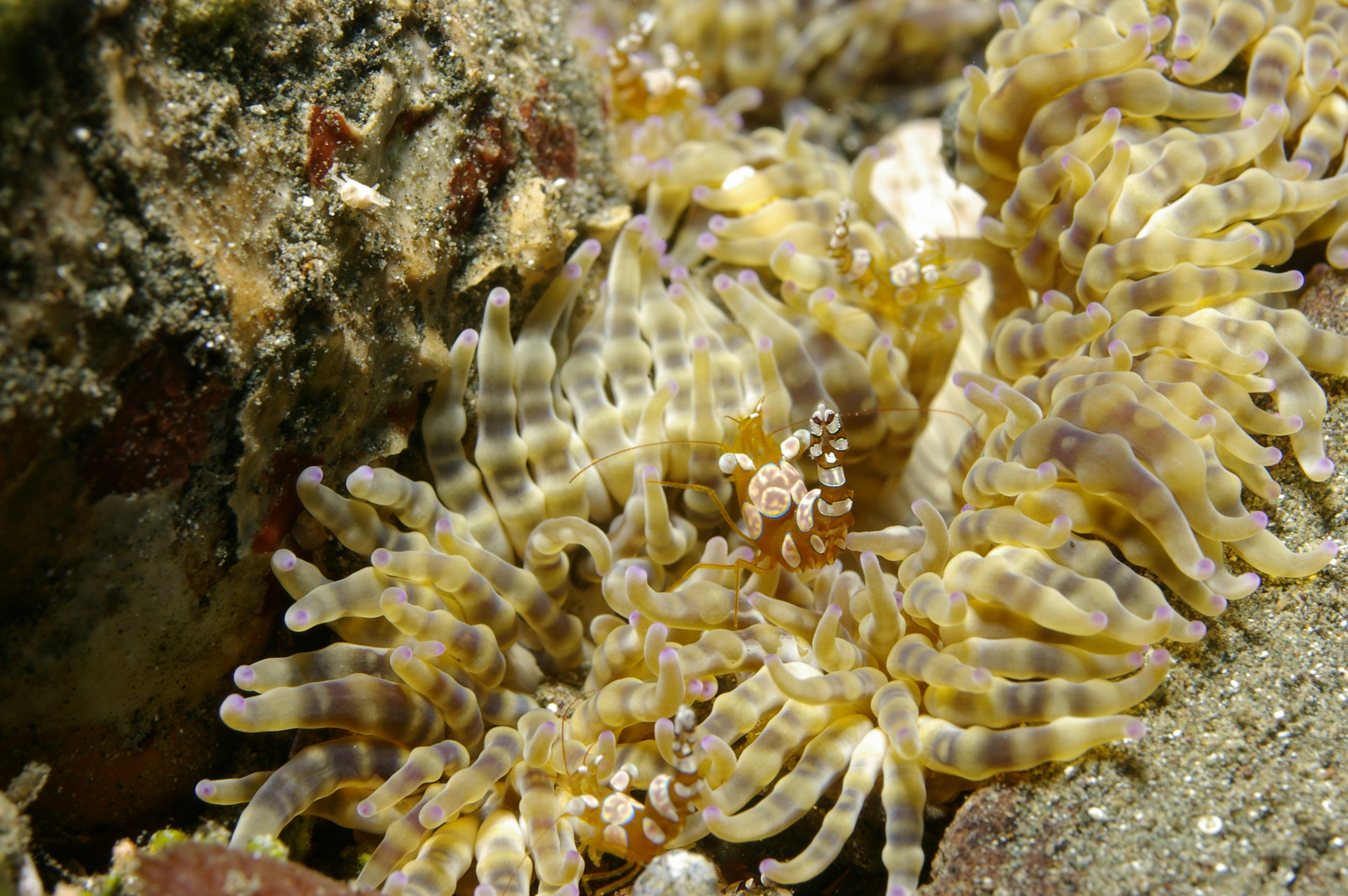
H. aurora with shrimp & anemonefish

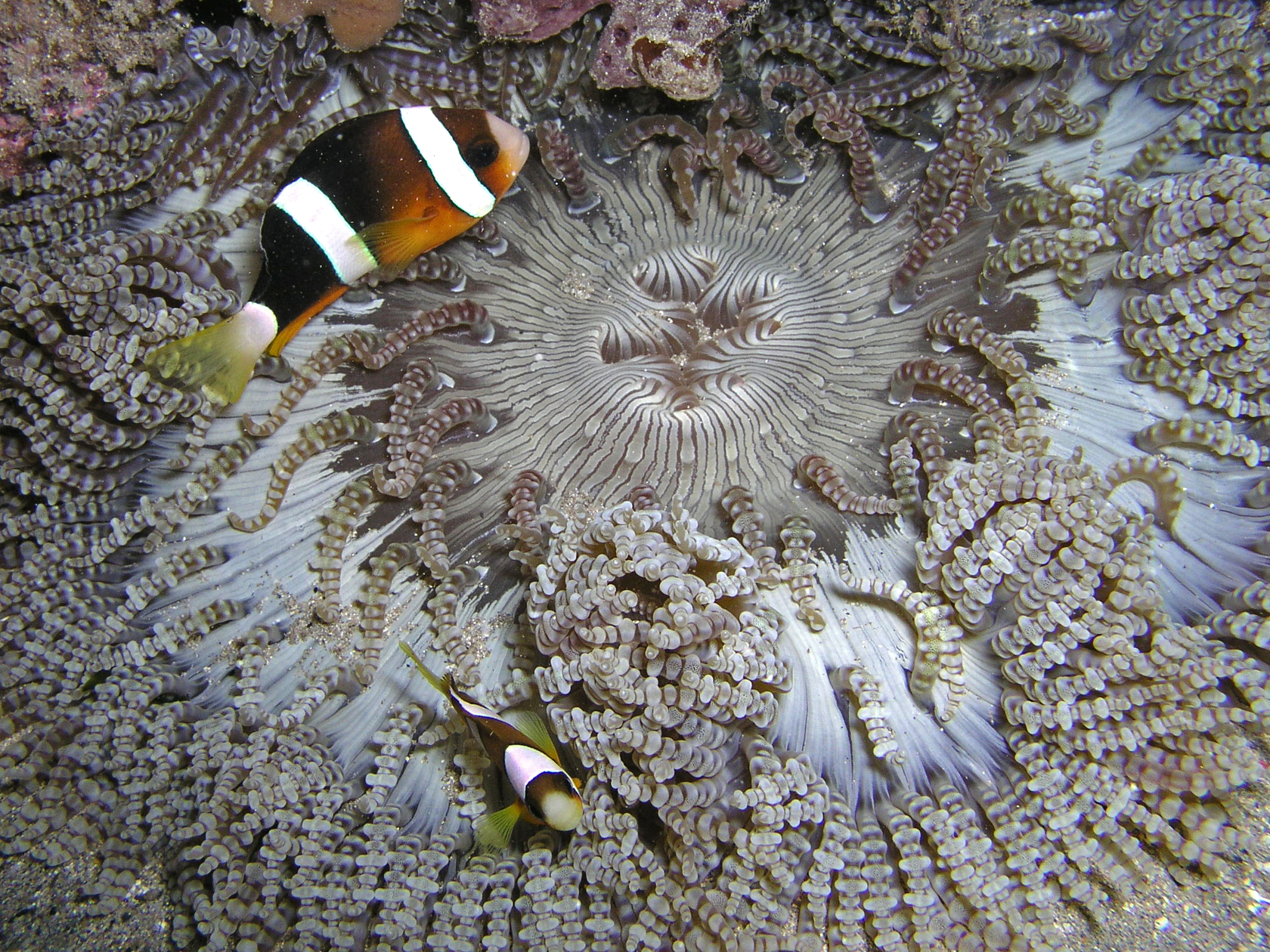
Amphiprion clarkii (Clark's anemonefish) with H. aurora, Timor

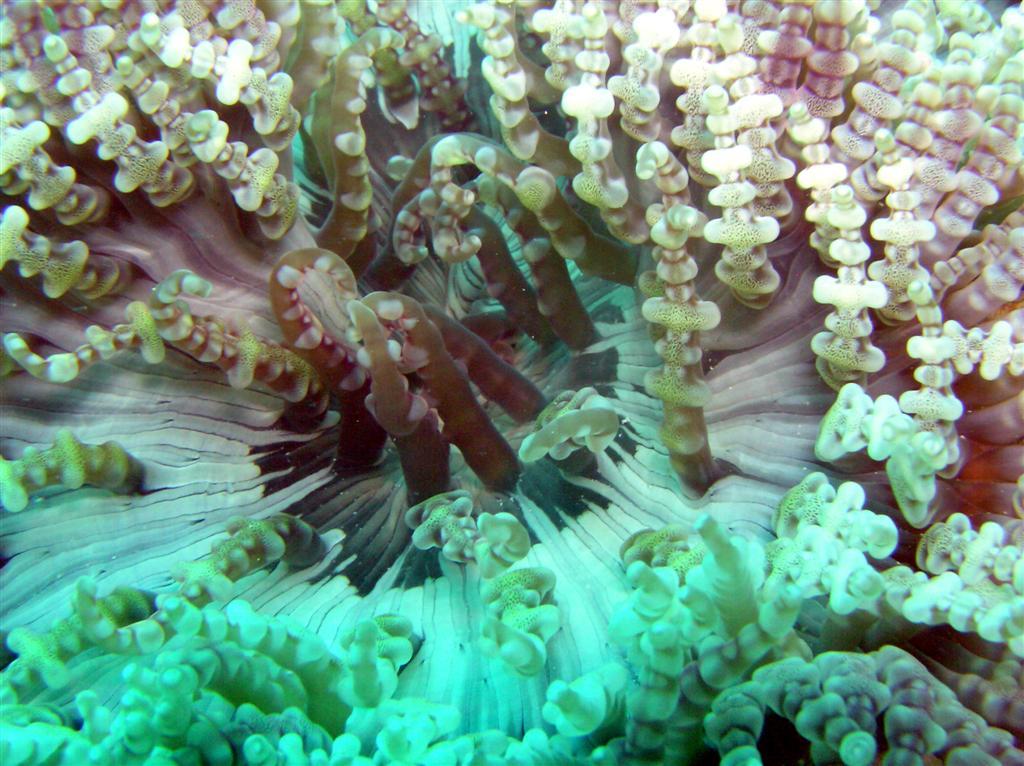
H. aurora, Panglao Island

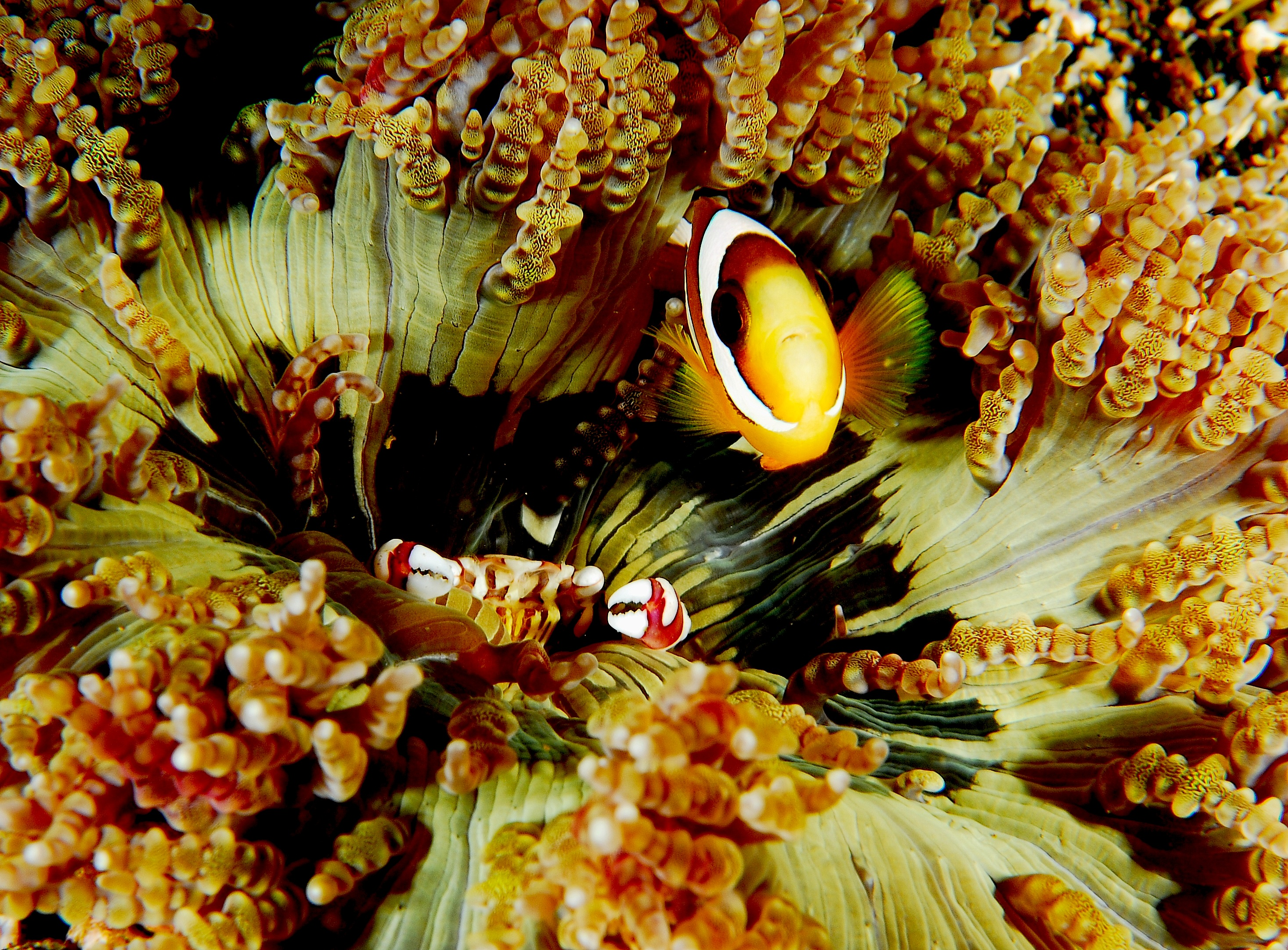
Crab & anemonefish with H. aurora

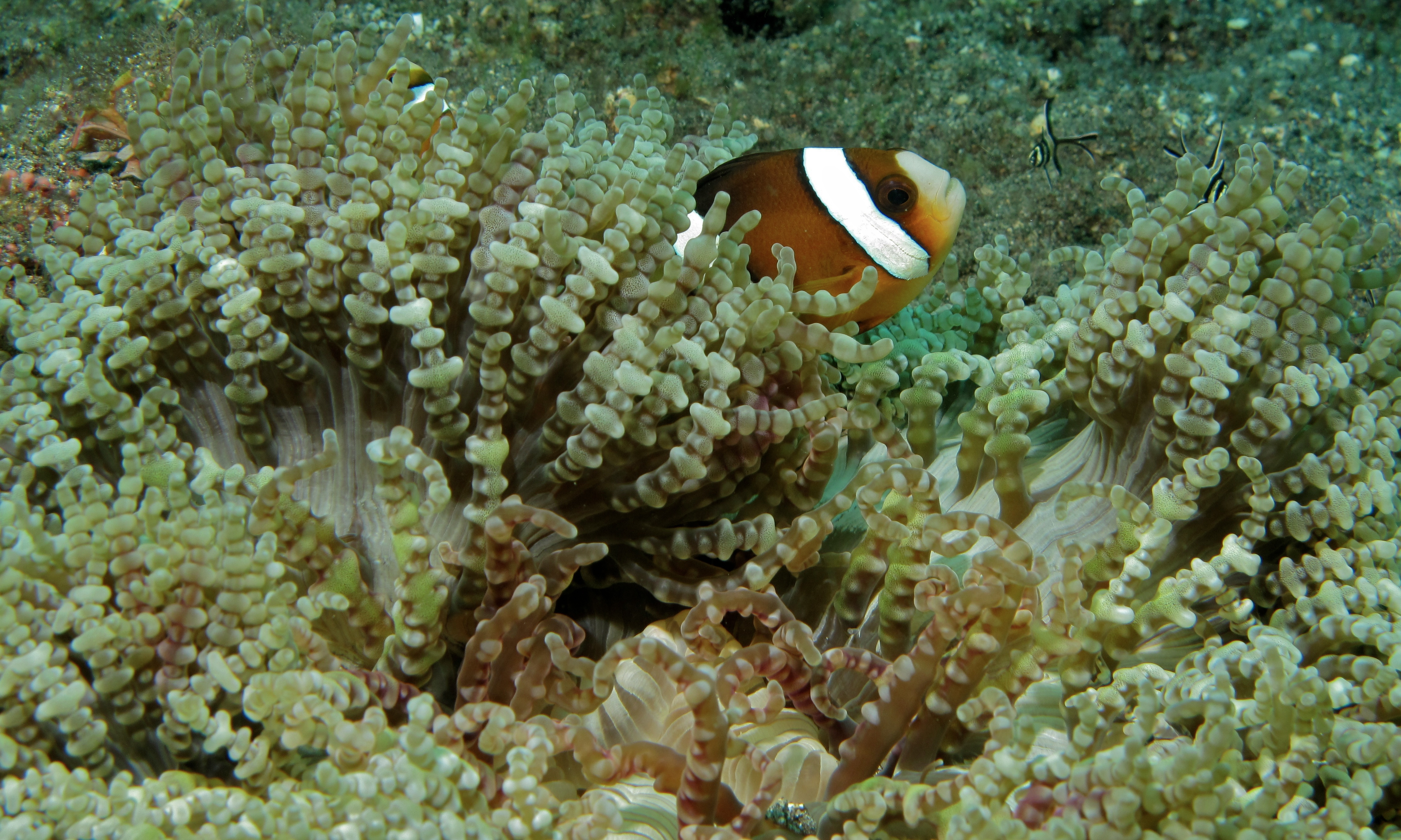
Amphiprion clarkii (Clark's anemonefish) in H. aurora

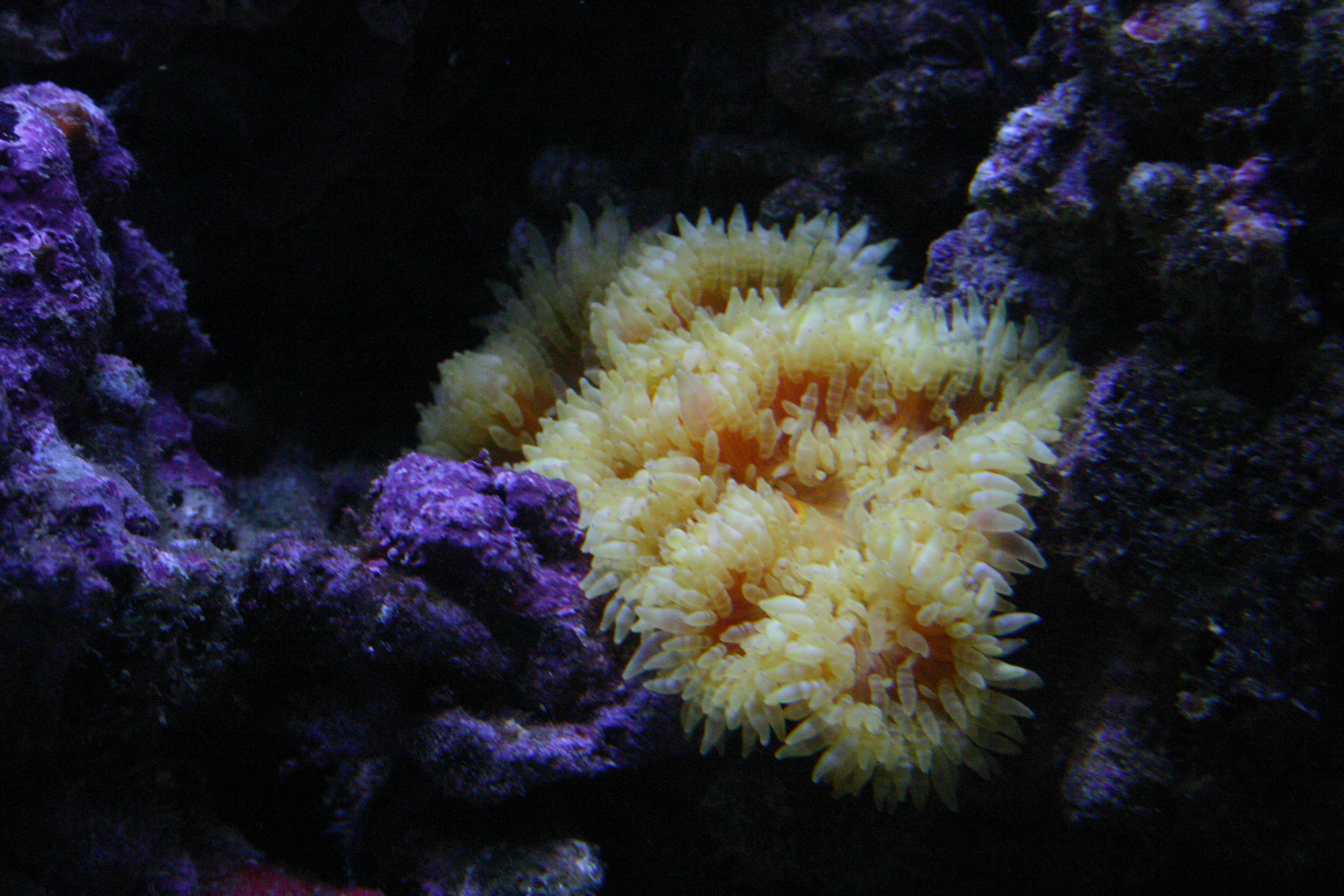
H. aurora in an aquarium
