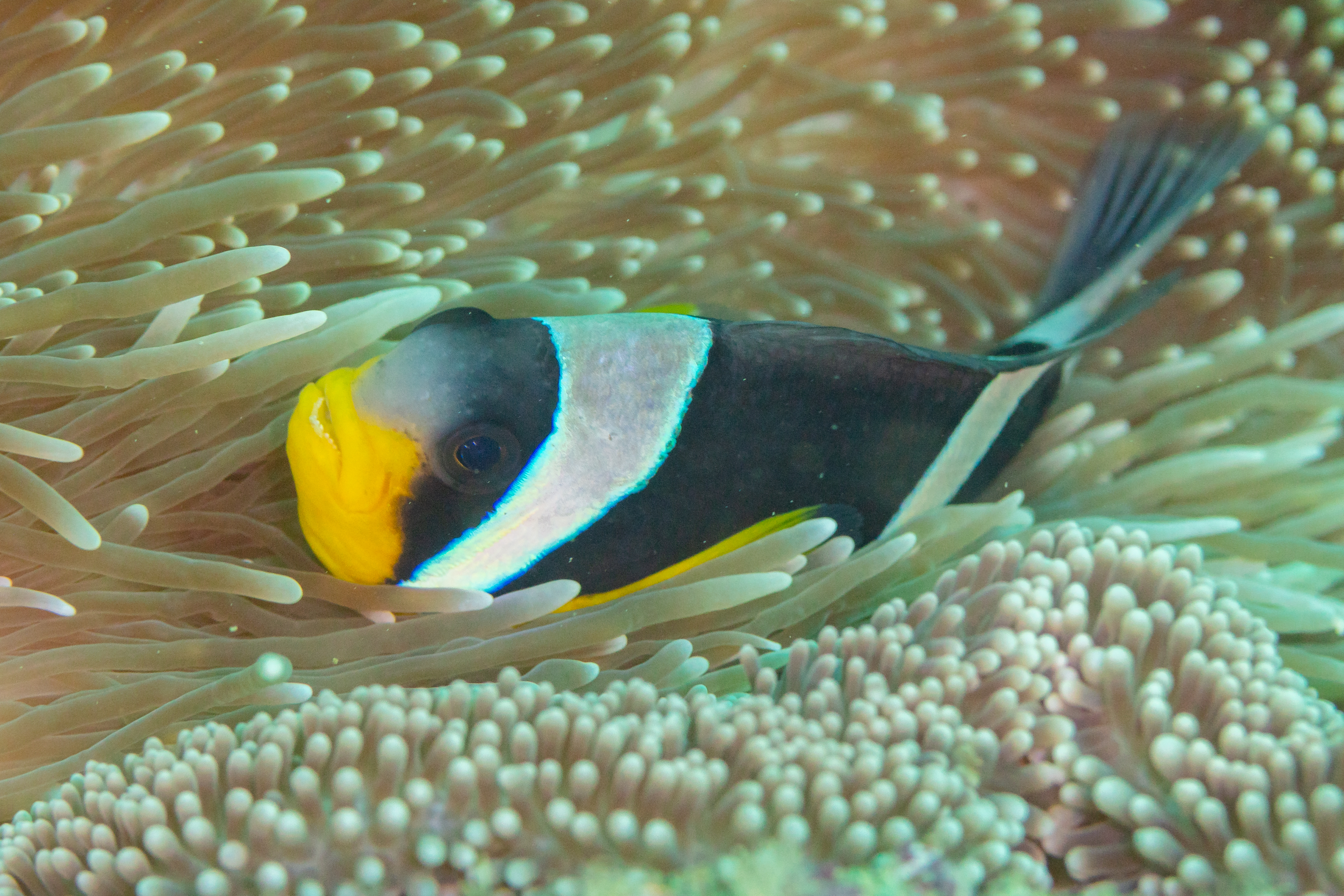

Conservation status
- Least Concern (IUCN 3.1)

Scientific classification
- Kingdom: Animalia
- Phylum: Chordata
- Class: Actinopterygii
- Order: Blenniiformes
- Family: Pomacentridae
- Genus: Amphiprion
- Species: A. fuscocaudatus

Binomial name
- Amphiprion fuscocaudatus Allen 1972

= Amphiprion fuscocaudatus =

Species of fish

Amphiprion fuscocaudatus, the Seychelles anemonefish, is a marine fish belonging to the family Pomacentridae, the clownfishes and damselfishes.

== Description ==
The body of A. fuscocaudatus is dark brown to blackish, with the white bars and yellow or orange snout, breast, belly, pelvic and anal fins. The caudal fin has a dark central area and longitudinal streaks separated by lighter areas. They have 11 dorsal spines, 2 anal spines, 15-16 dorsal soft rays and 14 anal soft rays. They reach a maximum length of 14 cm (5 1/2 in).

=== Similar species ===
A. chrysogaster is very similar however, its caudal fin is uniformly dark with just a narrow white margin.

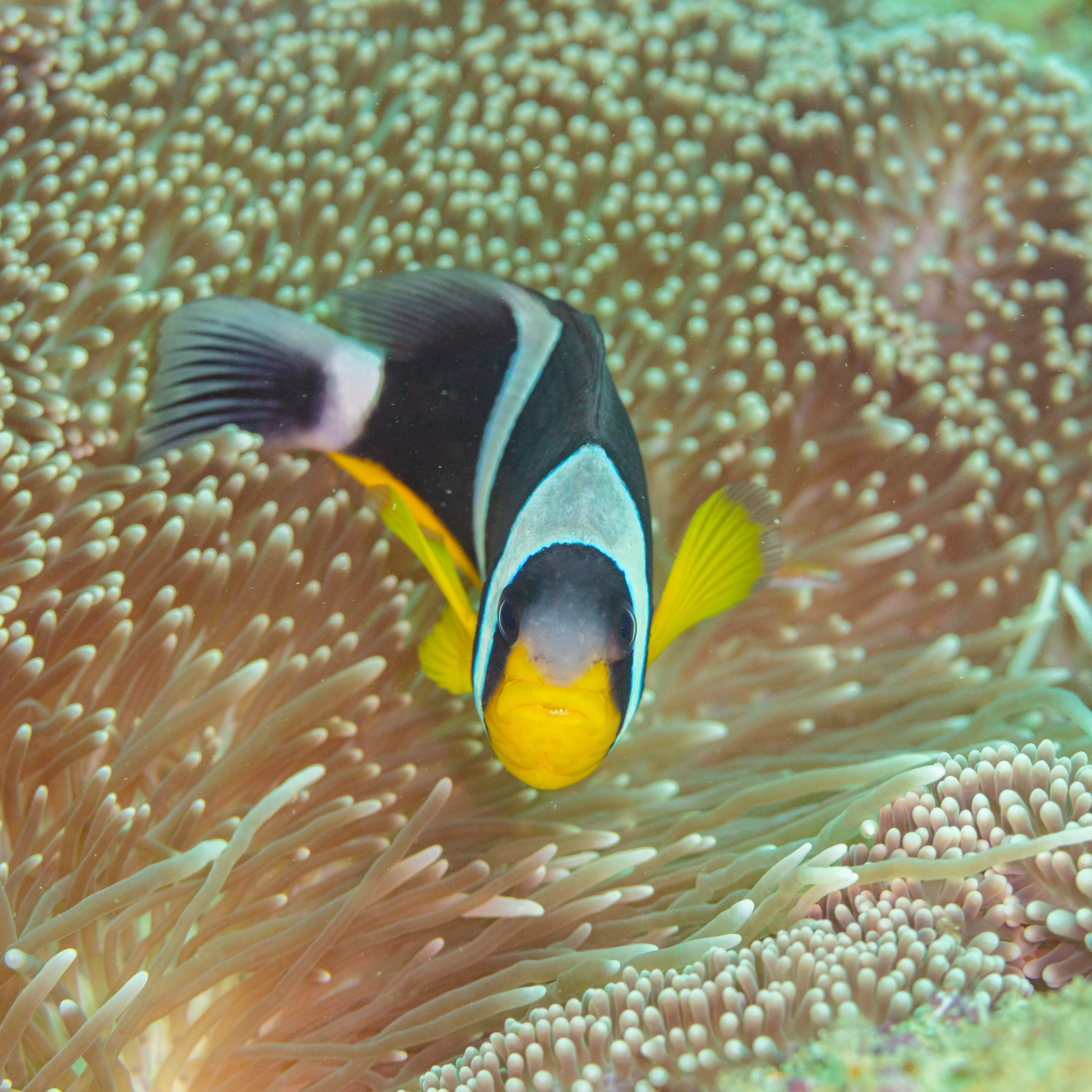
A. chrysogaster (Mauritian anemonefish)

== Distribution and habitat ==
A. fuscocaudatus is found only in the Seychelles Islands and Aldabra in the western Indian Ocean.

=== Host anemones ===
A. fuscocaudatus is associated with the following species of anemone:

- Stichodactyla mertensii Mertens' carpet sea anemone
