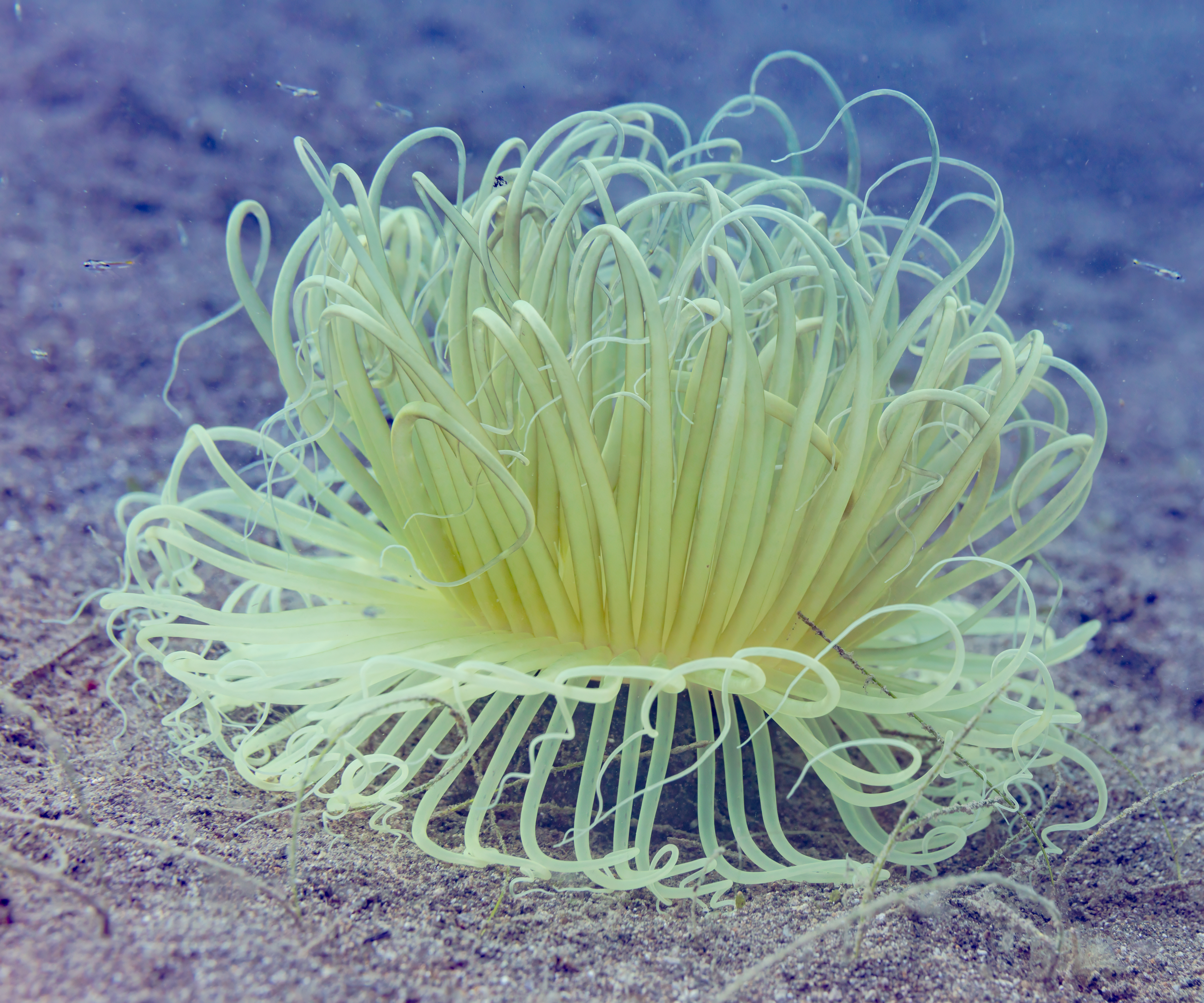

Scientific classification
- Kingdom: Animalia
- Phylum: Cnidaria
- Subphylum: Anthozoa
- Class: Hexacorallia
- Order: Actiniaria
- Family: Stichodactylidae
- Genus: Radianthus
- Species: R. doreensis

Binomial name
- Radianthus doreensis (Quoy & Gaimard, 1833)

Synonyms
- List: Actinia doreensis Quoy & Gaimard, 1833; Antheopsis doreensis (Quoy & Gaimard, 1833); Anthopleura gelam (Haddon & Shackleton, 1893); Cereactis doreyensis (Quoy & Gaimard, 1833); Condylactis doreensis (Quoy & Gaimard, 1833); Condylactis gelam Haddon & Shackleton, 1893; Heteractis doreensis (Quoy & Gaimard, 1833); Macrodactyla doorensis; Macrodactyla doreenensis; Macrodactyla doreensis (Quoy & Gaimard, 1833); Macrodactyla gelam (Mariscal 1972); Paractis doreyensis

= Radianthus doreensis =

Species of sea anemone

Radianthus doreensis, also known as long tentacle anemone and corkscrew tentacle sea anemone, is a species of sea anemone in the family Stichodactylidae.

== Description ==
Radianthus doreensis has relatively few tentacles. They are all similar to one another in size and colour, being purplish-gray to brown. Each grows to about 1.75 inches, are sinuous, and each taper evenly toward the tip. In some cases they have a corkscrew shape.

The oral disc is normally purplish-gray to brown, and sometimes has a green cast. It has a flared shape, and grows to a maximum of 5 cm wide, but is often far smaller. It has white lines that are oriented radially, sometimes extending onto the tentacles.

This species remains at the surface of the sediment, with the column buried. The lower portion of the column is a dull orange to bright red colour, with the upper portion being brownish, containing a round to ovoid verrucae in rows oriented longitudinally.

== Distribution and habitat ==
This species is found in Japan, and south to the waters of New Guinea and northern Australia. This species is commonly found at depths of 5 metres or less in muddy bottoms, and is commonly seen without fish present.

== Behaviour ==
The tentacles of Radianthus doreensis may either shrivel, or stick to the hand of a person who disturbs it. This anemone can retract entirely into the sediment.

== Symbionts ==
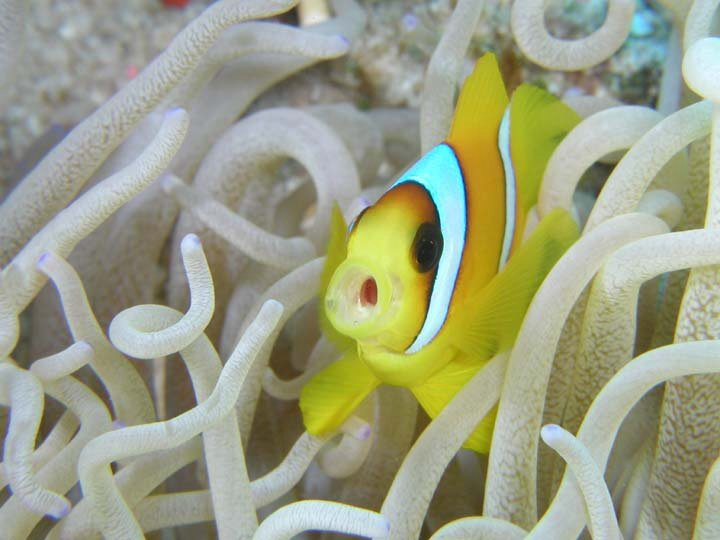
Amphiprion clarkii on Radianthus doreensis

R. doreensis is a host of 5 different species of fish. (Note: R. doreensis was recorded as a host of Amphiprion chrysogaster, the Mauritian anemonefish, however this was an error.)

- Amphiprion chrysopterus orange-fin anemonefish
- A. clarkii, the yellowtail anemonefish
- A. ocellaris Western clownfish
- A. perideraion pink skunk anemonefish.
- Dascyllus trimaculatus 3 spot dascyllus.
