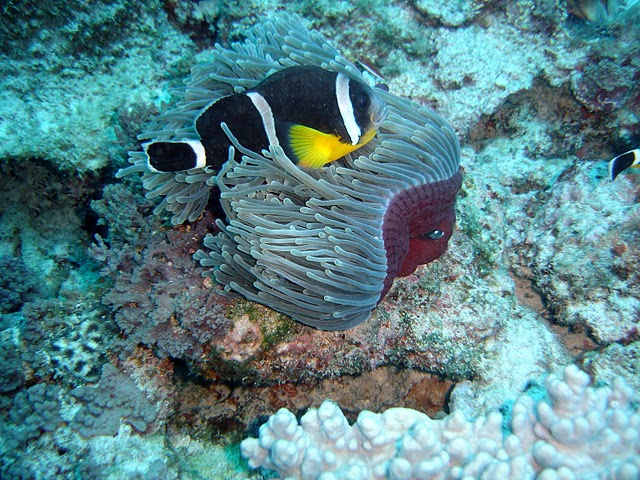

Conservation status
- Least Concern (IUCN 3.1)

Scientific classification
- Kingdom: Animalia
- Phylum: Chordata
- Class: Actinopterygii
- Order: Blenniiformes
- Family: Pomacentridae
- Genus: Amphiprion
- Species: A. chrysogaster

Binomial name
- Amphiprion chrysogaster Cuvier, 1830

= Amphiprion chrysogaster =

Species of fish

Amphiprion chrysogaster, the Mauritian anemonefish, is a marine fish belonging to the family Pomacentridae, the clownfishes and damselfishes. It is endemic to Mauritius and probably Réunion.

== Characteristics of Anemonefish ==
Clownfish or anemonefish are fishes that, in the wild, form symbiotic mutualisms with sea anemones and are unaffected by the stinging tentacles of the host anemone, see Amphiprioninae § Mutualism. The sea anemone protects the clownfish from predators, as well as providing food through the scraps left from the anemone's meals and occasional dead anemone tentacles. In return, the clownfish defends the anemone from its predators and parasites. Clownfish are small-sized, 10–18 centimetres (3.9–7.1 in), and depending on species, they are overall yellow, orange, or a reddish or blackish color, and many show white bars or patches. Within species there may be color variations, most commonly according to distribution, but also based on sex, age and host anemone. Clownfish are found in warmer waters of the Indian and Pacific oceans and the Red Sea in sheltered reefs or in shallow lagoons.

In a group of clownfish, there is a strict dominance hierarchy. The largest and most aggressive fish is female and is found at the top. Only two clownfish, a male and a female, in a group reproduce through external fertilization. Clownfish are sequential hermaphrodites, meaning that they develop into males first, and when they mature, they become females.

== Description ==
Adults are very dark brown, nearly black with three white bars. The snout and breast are orange. The caudal fin is blackish or dark brown and the anal fin may be blackish or orange-yellow. They have 10 dorsal spines, 2 anal spines, 16-17 dorsal soft rays and 13-14 anal soft rays. They reach a maximum length of 14 cm (5 1/2 in).

=== Color variations ===
Fish that are generally blackish except for the three white bars are associated with the host anemone Stichodactyla mertensii, Mertens' carpet sea anemone.

=== Similar species ===
The Seychelles anemonefish, A. fuscocaudatus, is distinguished by location, the number of dorsal spines and the solid dark tail of A. chrysogaster compared with dark streaks on the tail of A. fuscocaudatus. A. tricinctus (Three-band anemonefish) is also distinguished by location, being found only in the Marshall Islands in the Pacific and has a narrower bar across the tail base than A. chrysogaster

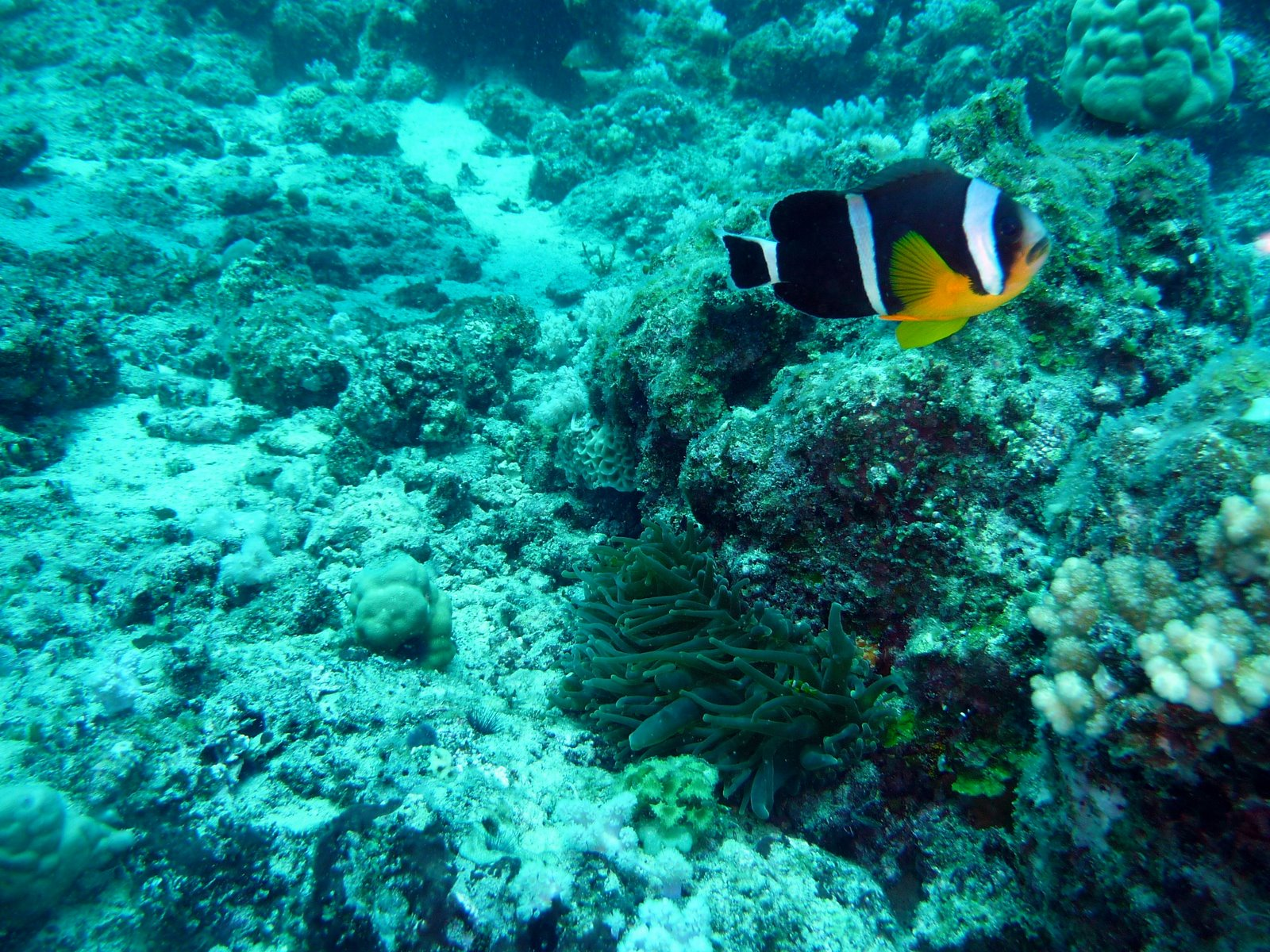
A. chrysogaster (Mauritian anemonefish)

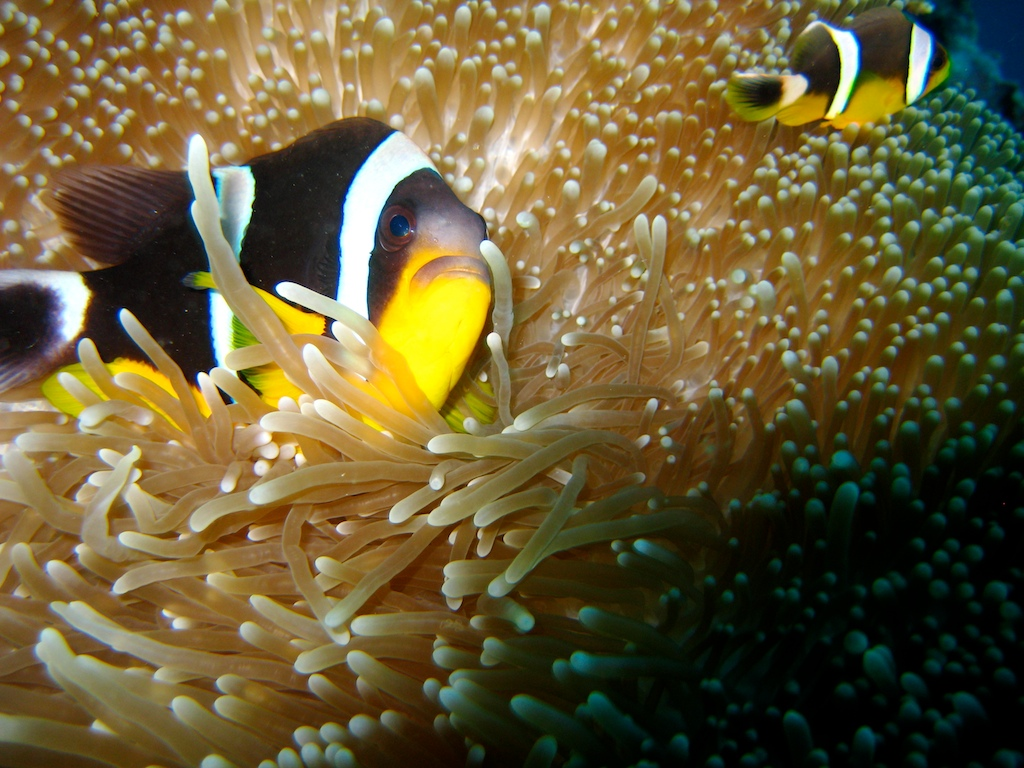
A. fuscocaudatus (Seychelles anemonefish)

== Distribution and habitat ==
The Mauritian anemonefish is found only in Mauritius and probably Réunion.

=== Host anemones ===
The Mauritian anemonefish is hosted by the following species of anemones: (Note: Macrodactyla doreensis was recorded as a host of A. chrysogaster, however this was an error.)

- Heteractis magnifica magnificent sea anemone
- Stichodactyla haddoni
- Stichodactyla mertensii Mertens' carpet sea anemone
