= Nestedness =

Nestedness is a measure of structure in an ecological system, usually applied to species-sites systems (describing the distribution of species across locations), or species-species interaction networks (describing the interactions between species, usually as bipartite networks such as hosts-parasites, plants-pollinators, etc.).

A system (usually represented as a matrix) is said to be nested when the elements that have a few items in them (locations with few species, species with few interactions) have a subset of the items of elements with more items. Imagine a series of islands that are ordered by their distance from the mainland. If the mainland has all species, the first island has a subset of mainland's species, the second island has a subset of the first island's species, and so forth, then this system is perfectly nested.

== Measures of nestedness ==
One measurement unit for nestedness is a system's 'temperature' offered by Atmar and Patterson in 1993. This measures the order in which species' extinctions would occur in the system (or from the other side - the order of colonizing a system). The 'colder' the system is, the more fixed the order of extinction would be. In a warmer system, extinctions will take a more random order. Temperatures go from 0°, coldest and absolutely fixed, to 100° absolutely random.

For various reasons, the Nestedness Temperature Calculator is not mathematically satisfying (no unique solution, not conservative enough). A software (BINMATNEST) is available from the authors on request and from the Journal of Biogeography to correct these deficits In addition, ANINHADO solves problems of large matrix size and processing of a large number of randomized matrices; in addition it implements several null models to estimate the significance of nestedness.

Almeida-Neto et al introduced NODF (Nestedness metric based on overlap and decreasing fill), in which both key elements that lead to nested subsets (overlap among partners and differences in number of interactions) are incorporated. Bastolla et al. introduced a similar measure of nestedness based on the number of common neighbours for each pair of species, but without the assumption of differences in the number of interactions. Their work also connect nested patterns to implications to dynamics under some model assumptions. They argue that this can help reduce the effective competition between nodes in certain situations. For instance, two insect species might "help" each other by pollinating the same subset of plants, thereby reducing the extent to which they are harmful to each other. The authors suggest that this effect is behind a correlation between nestedness and diversity in plant-pollinator ecosystems. However, Johnson et al. have shown that this measure does not, in fact, properly account for the desired effect. These authors propose a refined version of the measure, and go on to show how certain network properties affect nestedness.

== Software ==
- Nestedness Temperature Calculator Program
- an Fortran Version correcting some of the initial problems, by Werner Ulrich, Poland
- ANINHADO, a Nestedness Temperature Calculator Program improving NTC for large matrices and implementing additional null models, by Paulo Guimarães and Paulo R. Guimarães Jr., Brazil
- Weighted Interaction Nestedness Estimator. It works with weighted matrices (i.e. species abundance)
- NeD - Nestedness for Dummies. A user friendly interface for nestedness analysis
