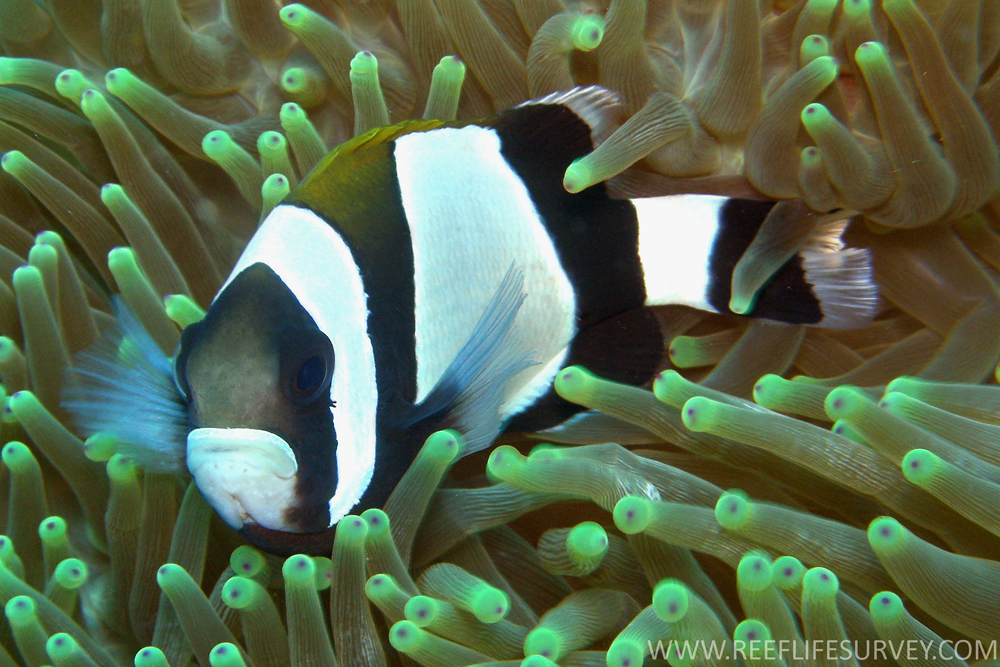

Conservation status
- Data Deficient (IUCN 3.1)

Scientific classification
- Kingdom: Animalia
- Phylum: Chordata
- Class: Actinopterygii
- Order: Blenniiformes
- Family: Pomacentridae
- Genus: Amphiprion
- Species: A. latezonatus

Binomial name
- Amphiprion latezonatus Waite, 1900

= Amphiprion latezonatus =

Species of fish

Amphiprion latezonatus, also known as the wide-band anemonefish, is a species of anemonefish found in subtropical waters off the east coast of Australia. Like all anemonefishes, it forms a symbiotic mutualism with sea anemones and is unaffected by the stinging tentacles of its host. It is a sequential hermaphrodite with a strict size-based dominance hierarchy; the female is largest, the breeding male is second largest, and the male nonbreeders get progressively smaller as the hierarchy descends. They exhibit protandry, meaning the breeding male changes to female if the sole breeding female dies, with the largest nonbreeder becoming the breeding male.

== Description ==
A. latezonatus grows to 14 cm (5 1/2 in) and is dark brown with three white bars and a broad white margin on the caudal fin. As the common name suggests, the middle bar is very wide, about twice the average width of other anemonefishes and is shaped like a flat-topped pyramid. They have 10 dorsal spines, two anal spines, 15–16 dorsal soft rays, and 13–14 anal soft rays.

=== Color variations ===
A. latezonatus often has bright blue markings on the upper lip and the edges of the bars. The dorsal fin may be orange or yellow

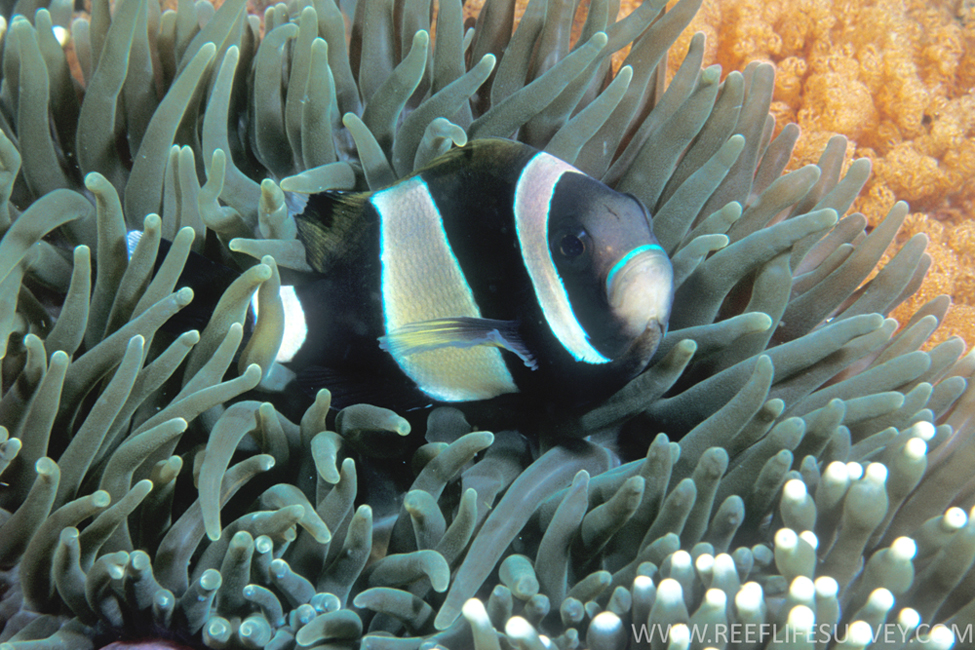
A. latezonatus showing blue markings

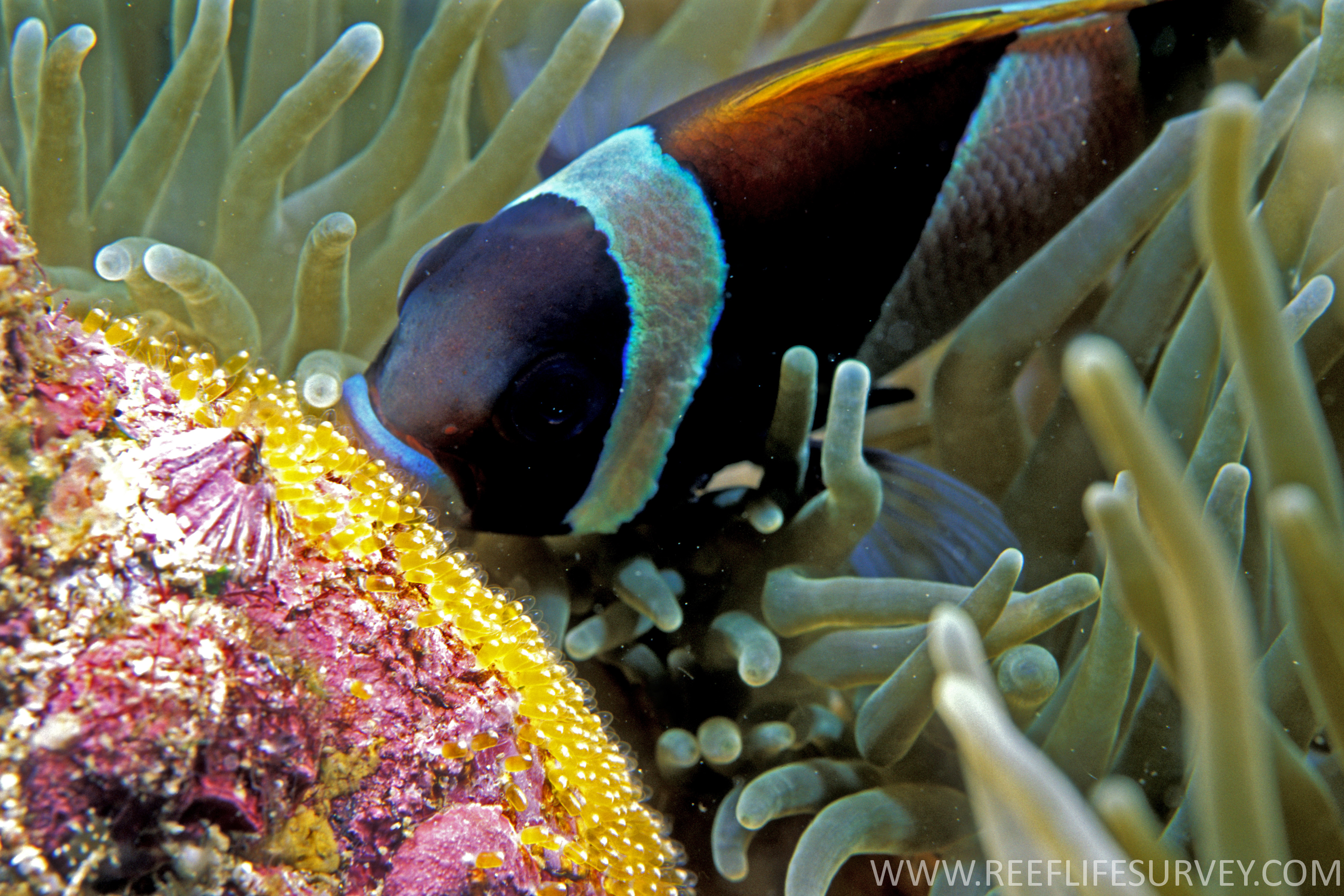
A. latezonatus showing orange dorsal fin

=== Similar species ===
The broad midbody bar is distinctive, and A. latezonatus is unlikely to be confused with any other anemonefish. The closest in appearance are A. polymnus (saddleback anemonefish) and A. sebae (sebae anemonefish), but A. latezonatus has a broader midband and lacks the characteristic slope of A. polymnus or A. sebae. Historically, anemonefish have been identified by morphological features and color pattern in the field, while in a laboratory, other features such as scalation of the head, tooth shape, and body proportions are used. These features have been used to group species into complexes, and A. latezonatus was considered as part of the saddleback complex with A. polymnus and A. sebae. Genetic analysis has shown that the saddleback complex is not a monophyletic group and that A. latezonatus has a monospecific lineage, and is more closely related to A. percula and Premnas biaculeatus than to the saddleback group.

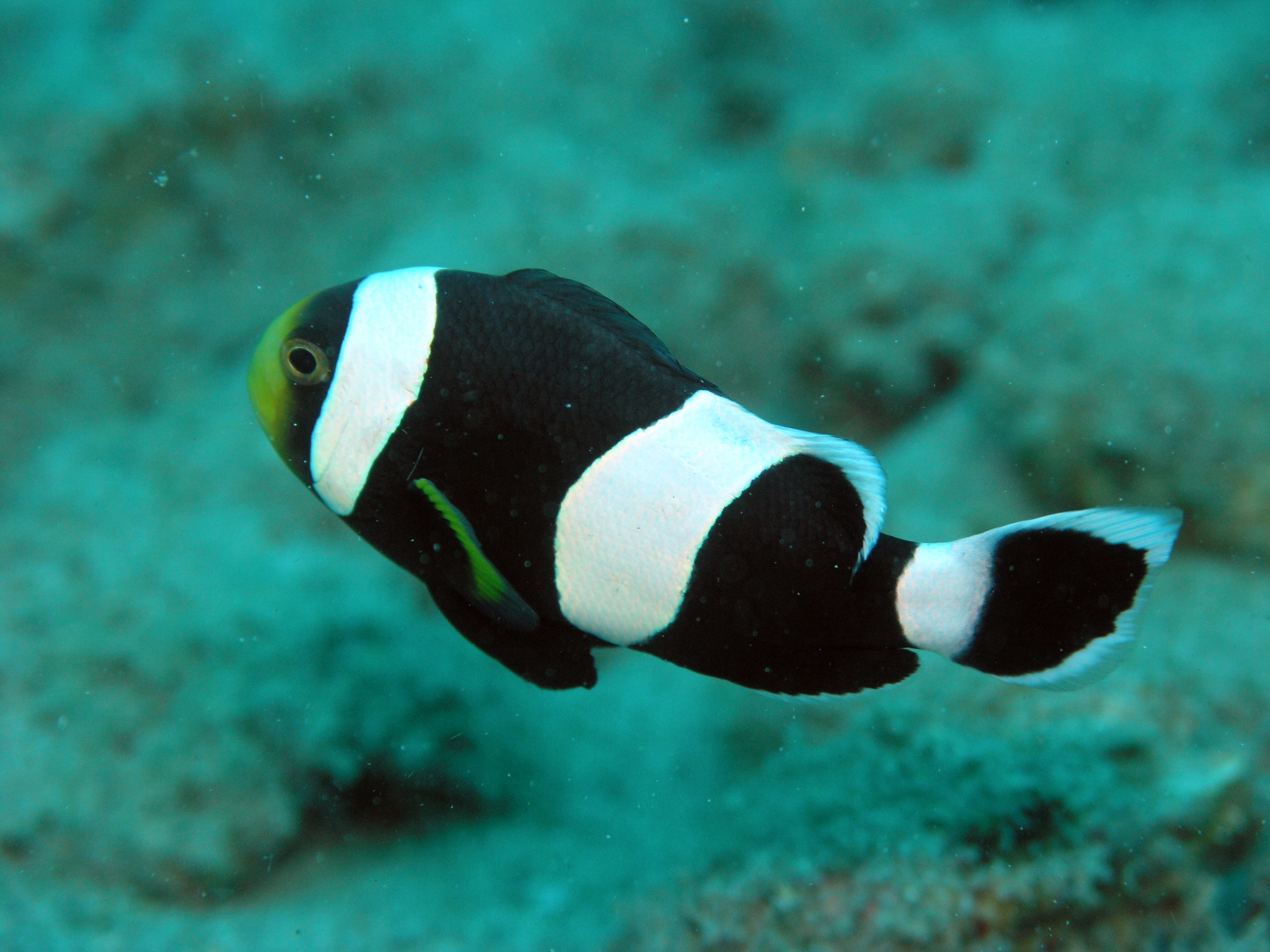
A. polymnus (saddleback anemonefish)

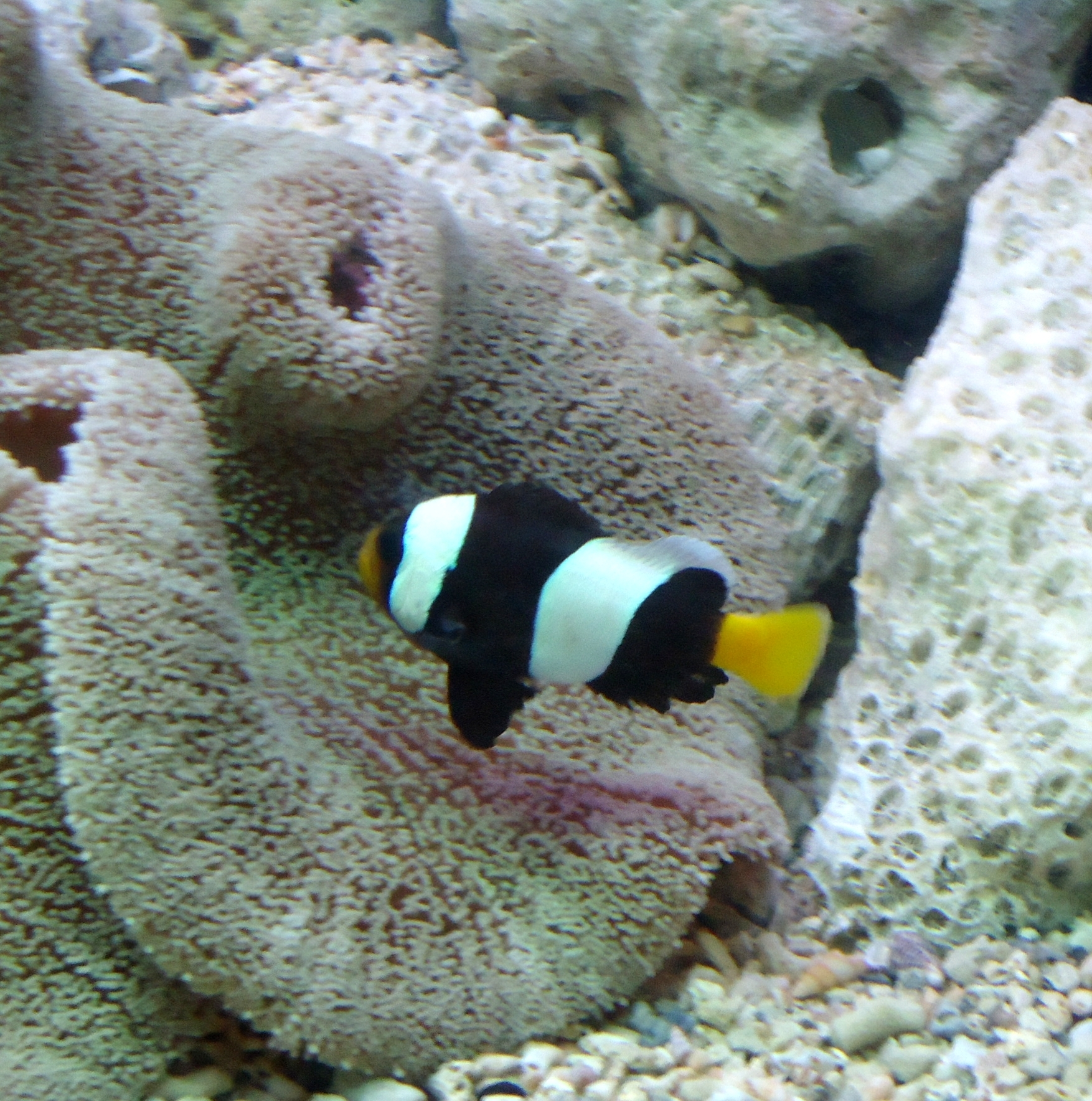
A. sebae (sebae anemonefish)

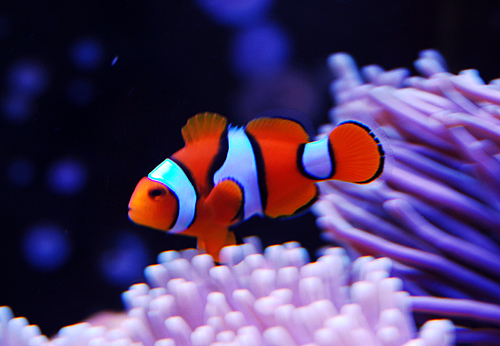
The genetically related A. percula (clownfish)

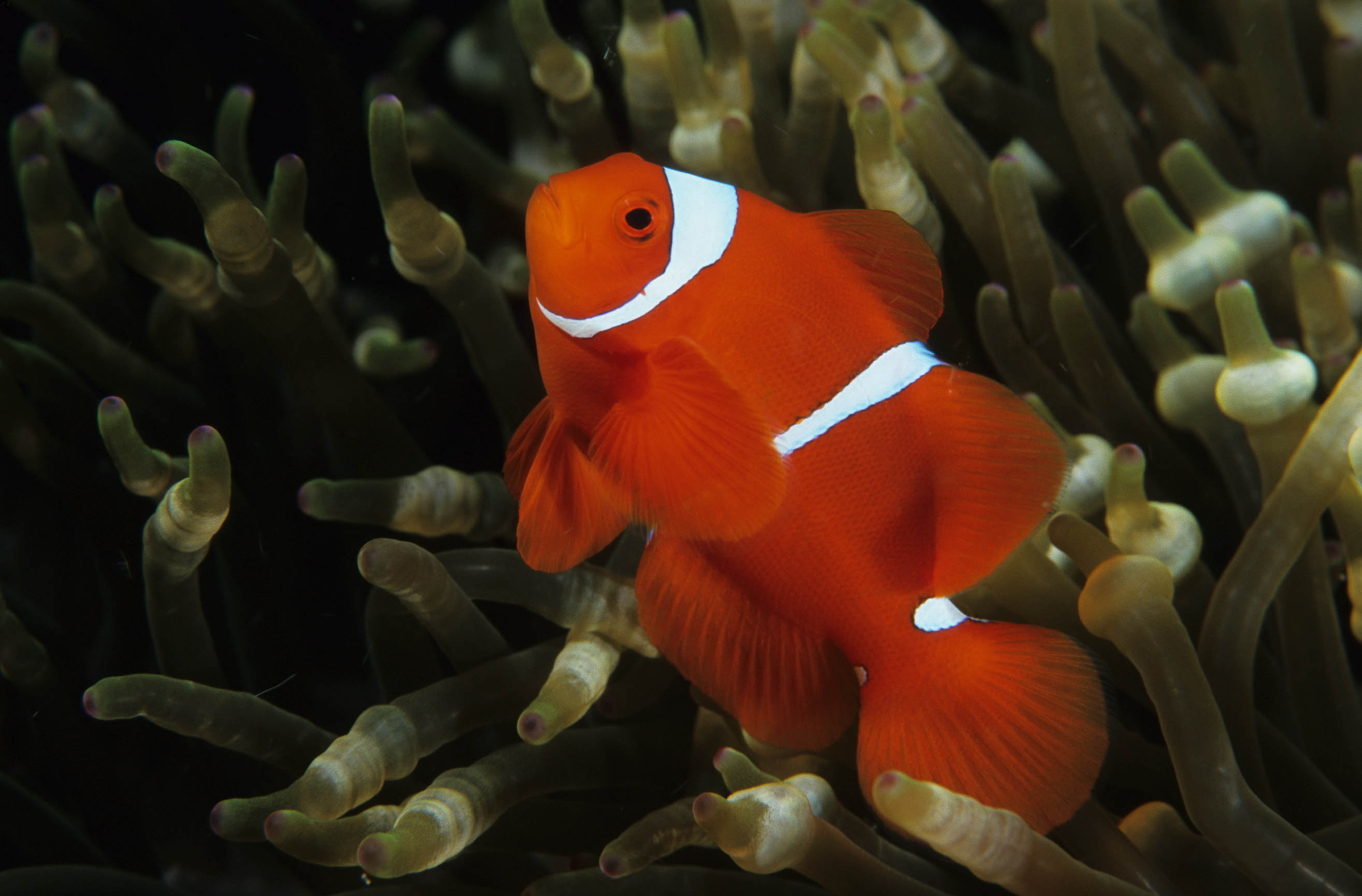
The genetically related Premnas biaculeatus (maroon or spine-cheeked anemonefish)

== Distribution and habitat ==
A. latezonatus is found in subtropical waters of Australia, from southern Queensland to northern New South Wales, Norfolk Island, and Lord Howe Island.

=== Host anemones ===
The relationship between anemonefish and their host sea anemones is not random and instead is highly nested in structure. A. latezonatus is highly specialised with only one species anemone host, Heteractis crispa (sebae anemone). A. latezonatus has been found in two additional host sea anemone species.

== Conservation status ==
Anemonefish and their host anemones are found on coral reefs and face similar environmental issues. Like corals, anemone's contain intracellular endosymbionts, zooxanthellae, and can suffer from bleaching due to triggers such as increased water temperature or acidification. Characteristics known to elevate the risk of extinction are small geographic range, small local population, and extreme habitat specialisation. A. latezonatus is an endemic species, confined to the subtropical east coast of Australia. The finding of A. latezonatus being hosted by two additional sea anemone species may reduce the risk of extinction associated with specialisation. This species was not evaluated in the 2012 release of the IUCN Red List

== In aquaria ==
A. latezonatus has been bred in captivity.
