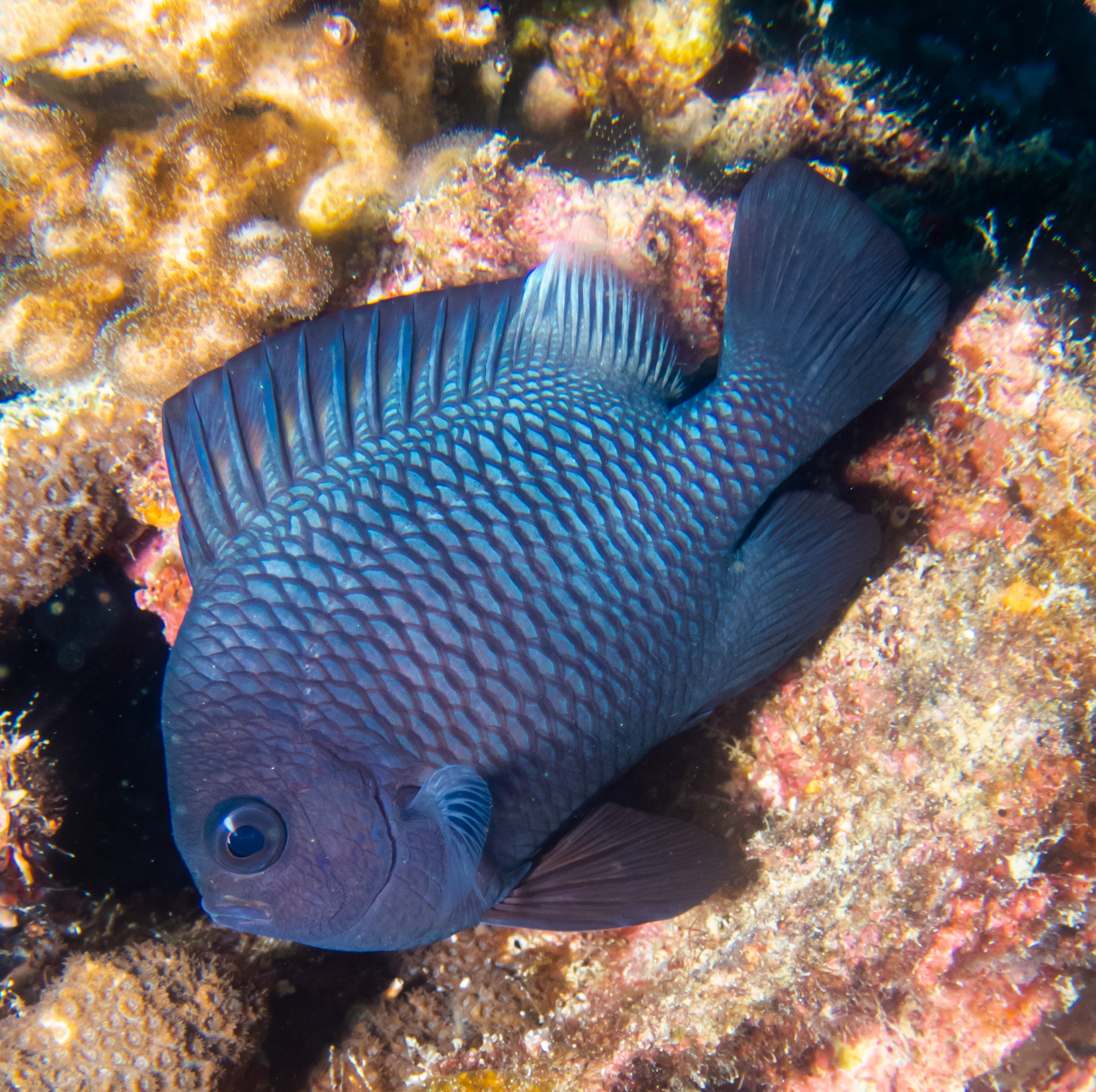

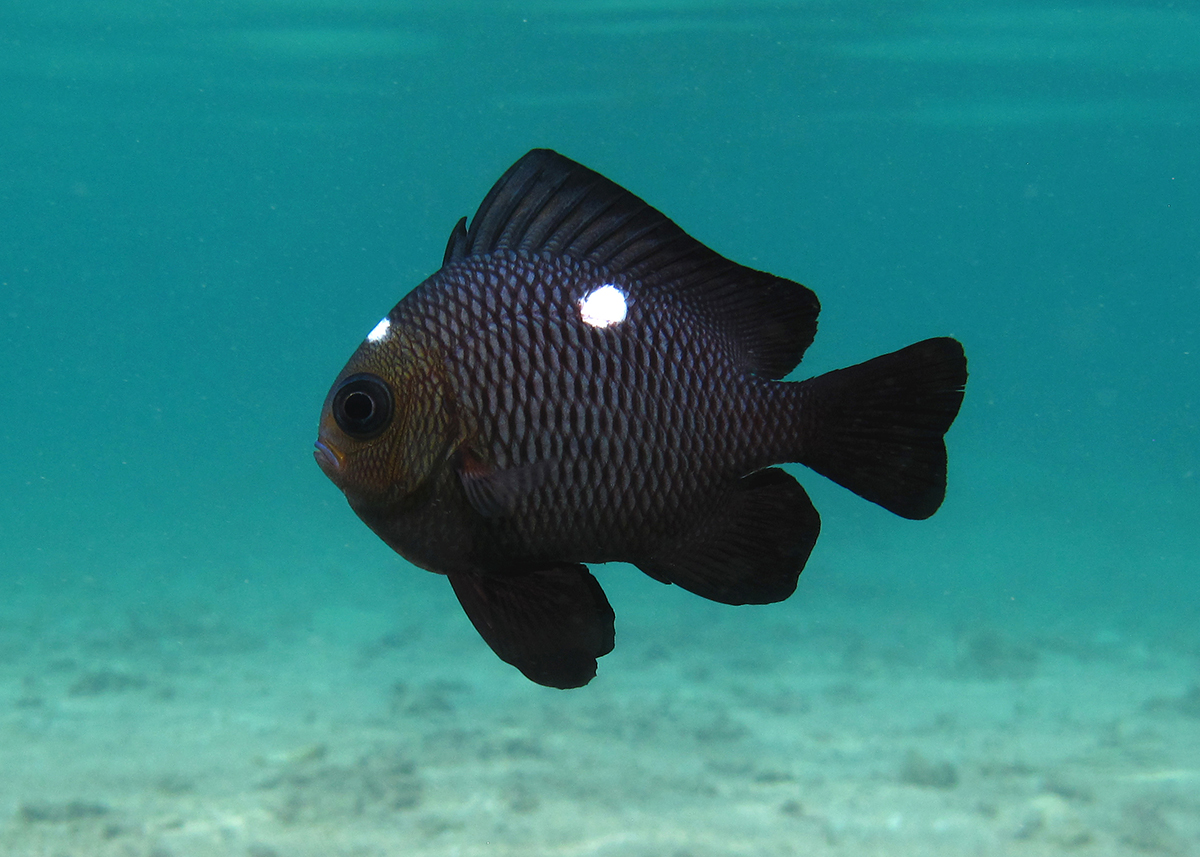
- Adult (top) and juvenile (bottom)

Conservation status
- Least Concern (IUCN 3.1)(Global)

- Vulnerable (IUCN 3.1) (Persian Gulf)

Scientific classification
- Kingdom: Animalia
- Phylum: Chordata
- Class: Actinopterygii
- Division: Teleostei
- Order: Blenniiformes
- Family: Pomacentridae
- Genus: Dascyllus
- Species: D. trimaculatus

Binomial name
- Dascyllus trimaculatus (Rüppell, 1829)

Synonyms
- Pomacentrus trimaculatus Rüppell, 1829; Pomacentrus nuchalis Anonymous [Bennett], 1830; Dascyllus unicolor Bennett, 1831; Dascyllus niger Bleeker, 1847; Sparus nigricans Gronow, 1854; Dascyllus axillaris J.L.B. Smith, 1935

= Threespot dascyllus =

Species of fish

The threespot dascyllus (Dascyllus trimaculatus), also known as the domino damsel or simply domino, is a species of damselfish from the family Pomacentridae. It is native to the Indo-Pacific from the Red Sea and East Africa, to the Pitcairn Islands, southern Japan, and Australia, and can also be found in some parts of the Philippines.

== Taxonomy ==
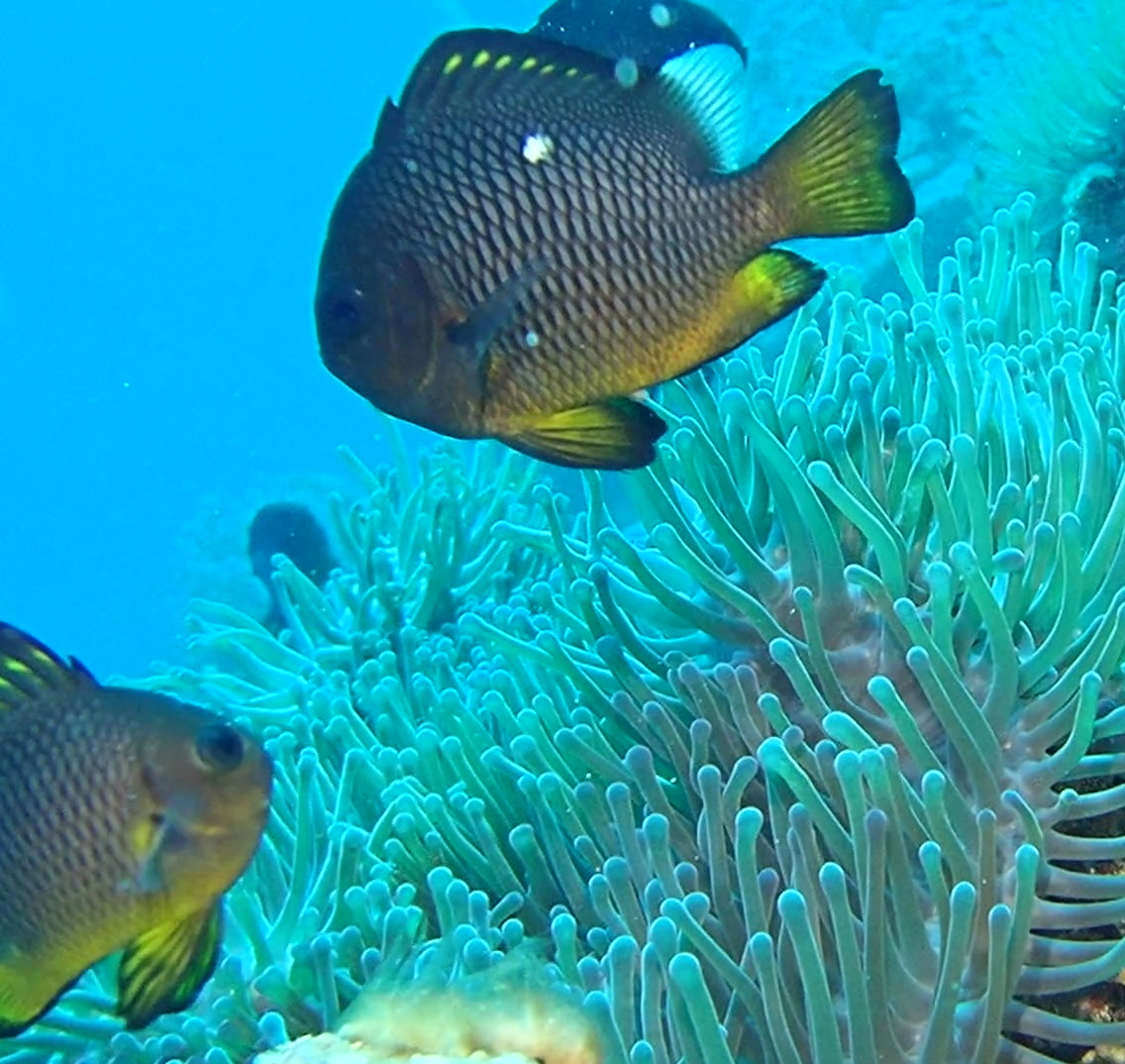
Adults in Fiji, showing yellow colouration from D. auripinnis introgression.

Dascyllus trimaculatus is one of four species in its namesake D. trimaculatus species complex. The other three species in this complex are D. albisella, D. strasburgi, and D. auripinnis. D. trimaculatus and D. auripinnis are parapatric (their ranges overlap in the Northern Cook Islands), but the four species are otherwise all allopatric. The D. trimaculatus complex diverged from the D. reticulatus complex 3.9 million years ago, in the Pleistocene.

Mitochondrial genome analysis found that D. trimaculatus itself can be split into three populations: Indian Ocean, southern French Polynesia, and West-Central Pacific. D. auripinnis has been found to clade with the West-Central Pacific population of D. trimaculatus, which raises some doubts as to the former's validity. Fish described as D. trimaculatus in Fiji have yellow pelvic and anal fins, and streaks of orange in the dorsal and caudal fins. These physically appear intermediate between D. trimaculatus and D. auripinnis; genomic analysis shows that they are a result of introgression of D. auripinnis into D. trimaculatus through repeated backcrossing.

=== Etymology ===
Trimaculatus, meaning "three-spotted", refers to the fish's three white spots. This accounts also for the common name "domino".

== Description ==
Its grey to black body has two lateral white spots and one between the eyes like domino hence the name; the threespot dascyllus grows up to 13 cm (5.1 in) in length. Coloration is somewhat variable; the spot on the forehead may be absent and the lateral spots very much reduced. It feeds on algae, copepods and other planktonic crustaceans.

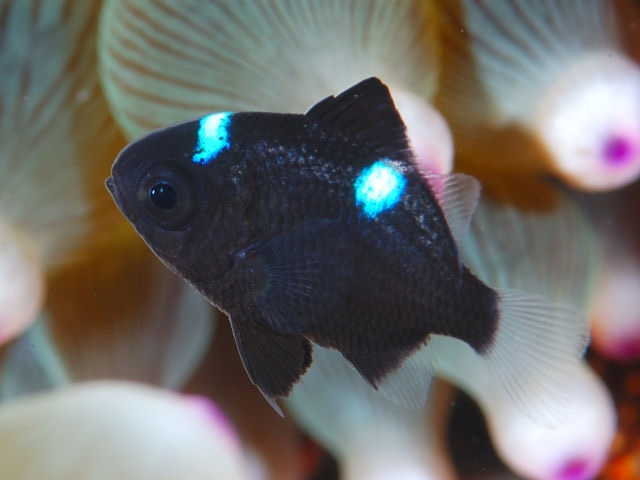
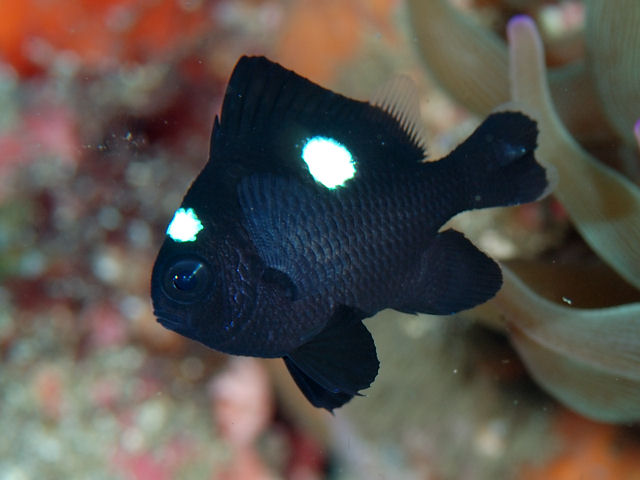
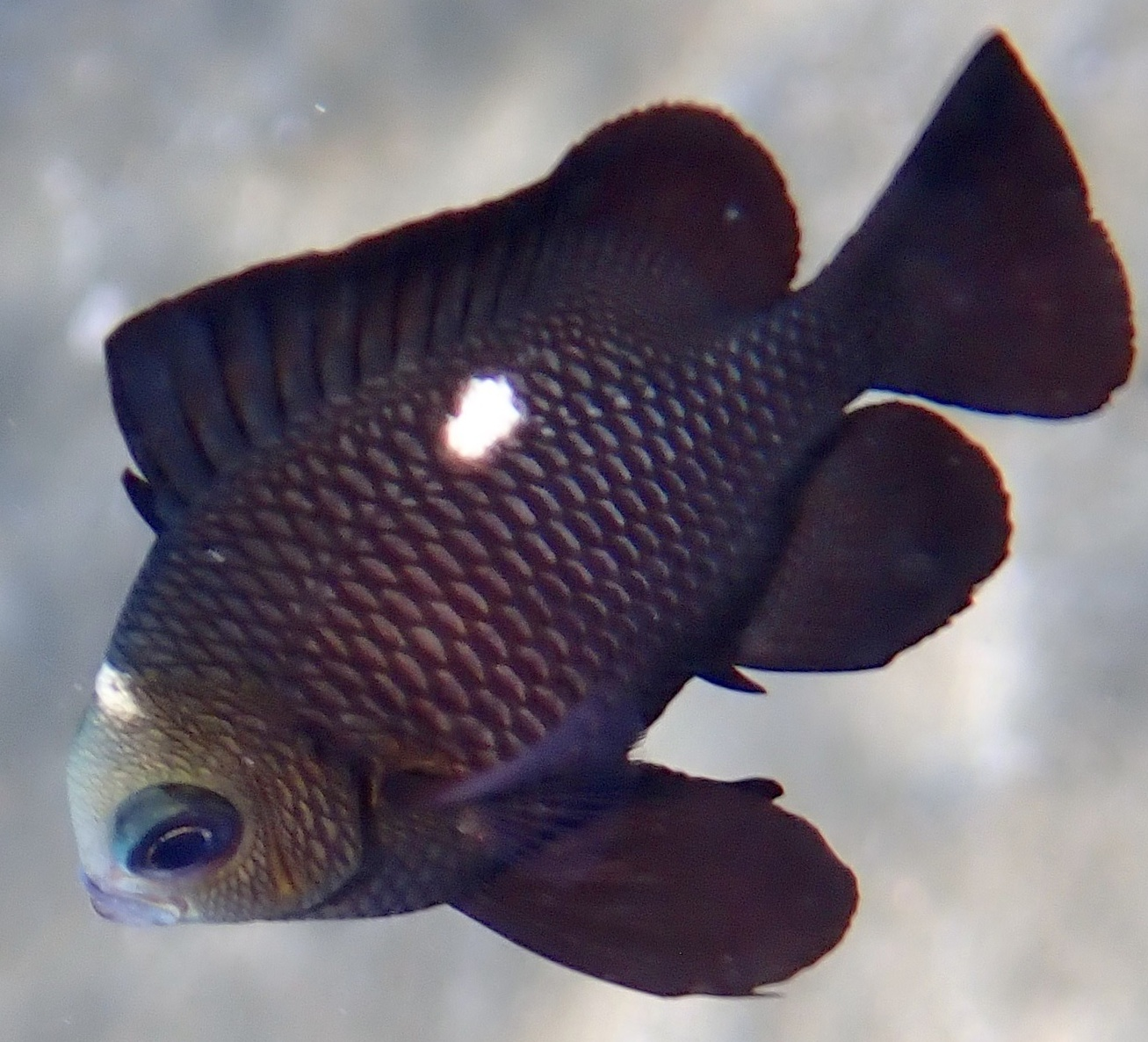
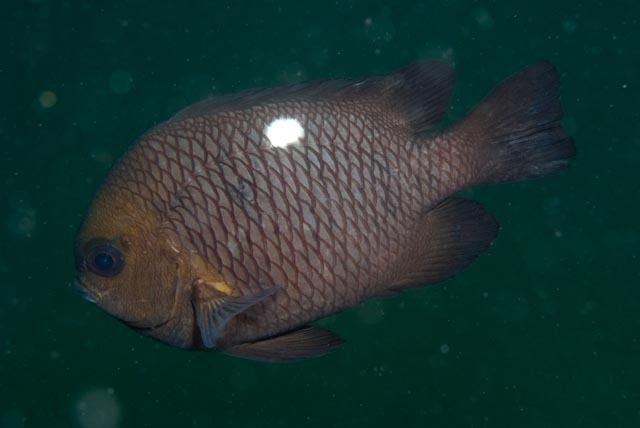
Growth series: from youngest juvenile to adult

== Habitat ==
Generally, adults are found in small groups around coral heads or large rocks. Juveniles may be found associated with large sea anemones or sheltering between the spines of diadema sea urchins or branching corals. This species may be found to depths of 55 m (180 ft).

== Biology ==
Like other species in the D. trimaculatus species complex, D. trimaculatus recognizes conspecifics using sound.

=== Symbiosis with anemones ===
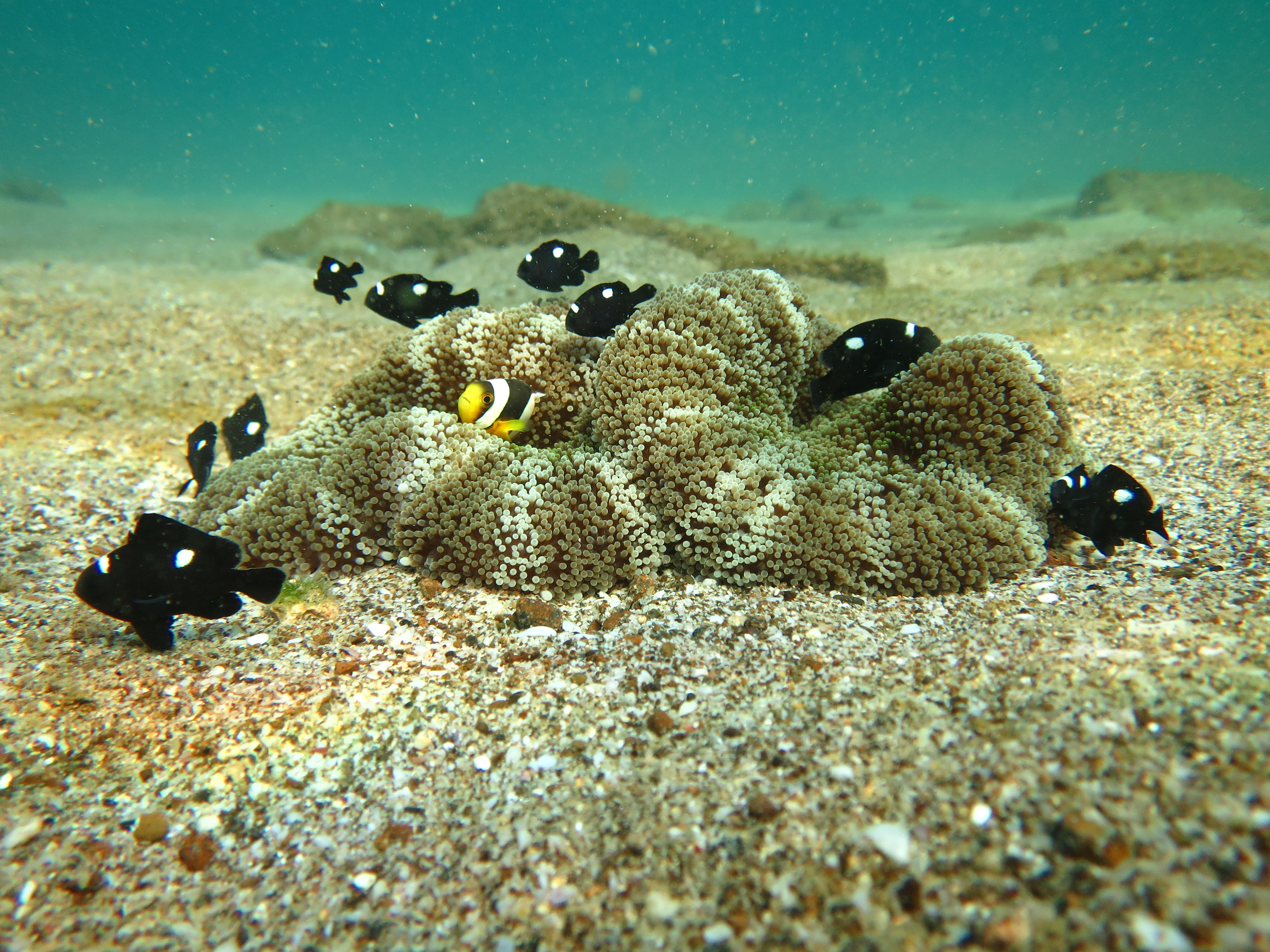
Juveniles hosting Stichodactyla haddoni with a sebae clownfish.

Juveniles dwell with anemones such as Stichodactyla mertensi for shelter. This relationship with anemones is lost as they mature into adults. On very rare occasions, the juveniles may use corals instead.

Juveniles may co-habit their hosted anemones with certain species of clownfish, although more aggressive clownfish species may refuse to share anemones.

Symbiosis with anemones is also seen in every other species of the D. trimaculatus species complex.

== In aquarium ==
During the juvenile period, they live with the sea anemone. They grow fast and can grow up to 14 cm (5.5 in) in length in a large fish tank.

== Gallery ==
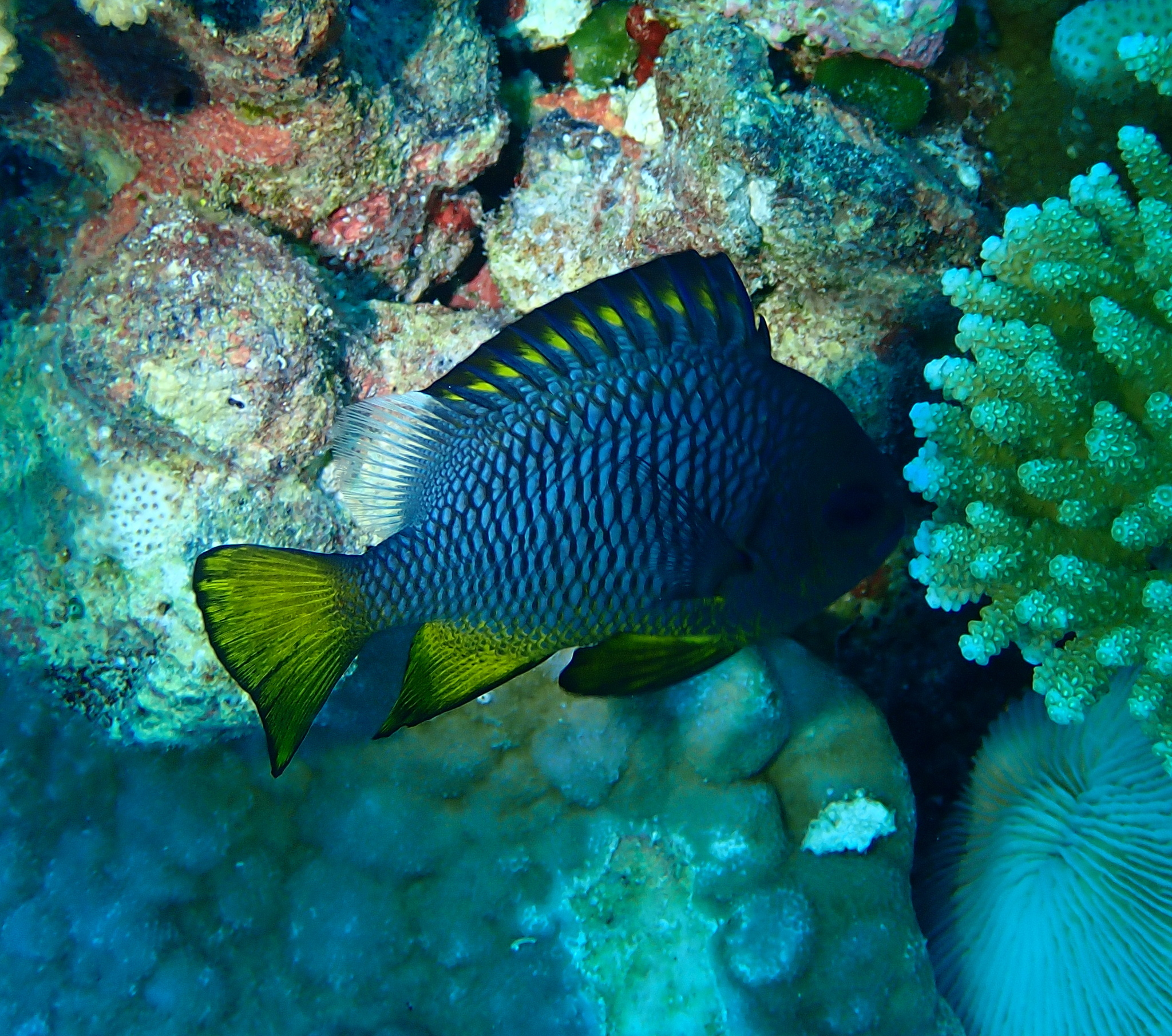
In Fiji, showing yellow colouration from D. auripinnis introgression.

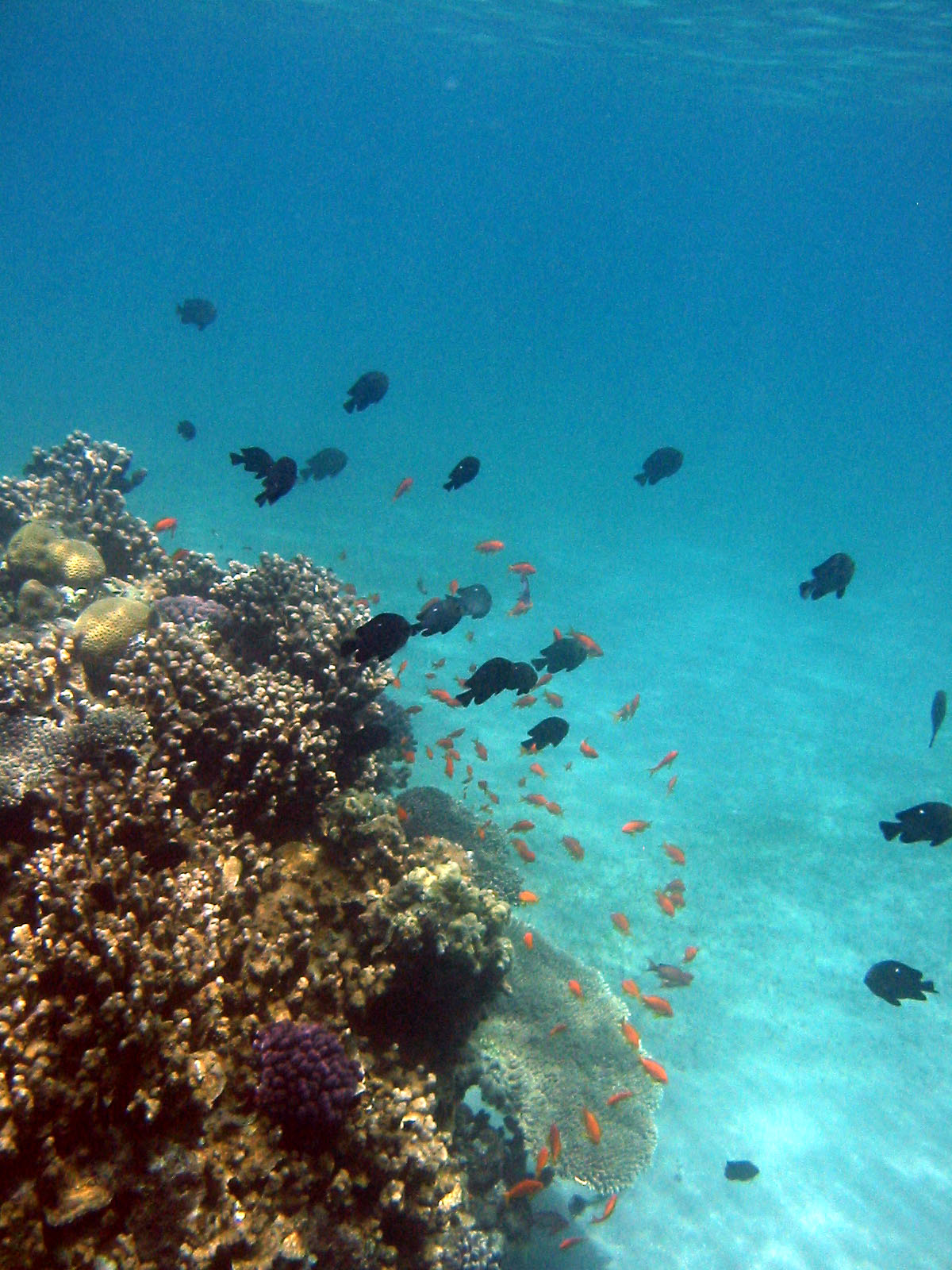
Threespot dascyllus and anthias grouping over coral near Taba, Egypt

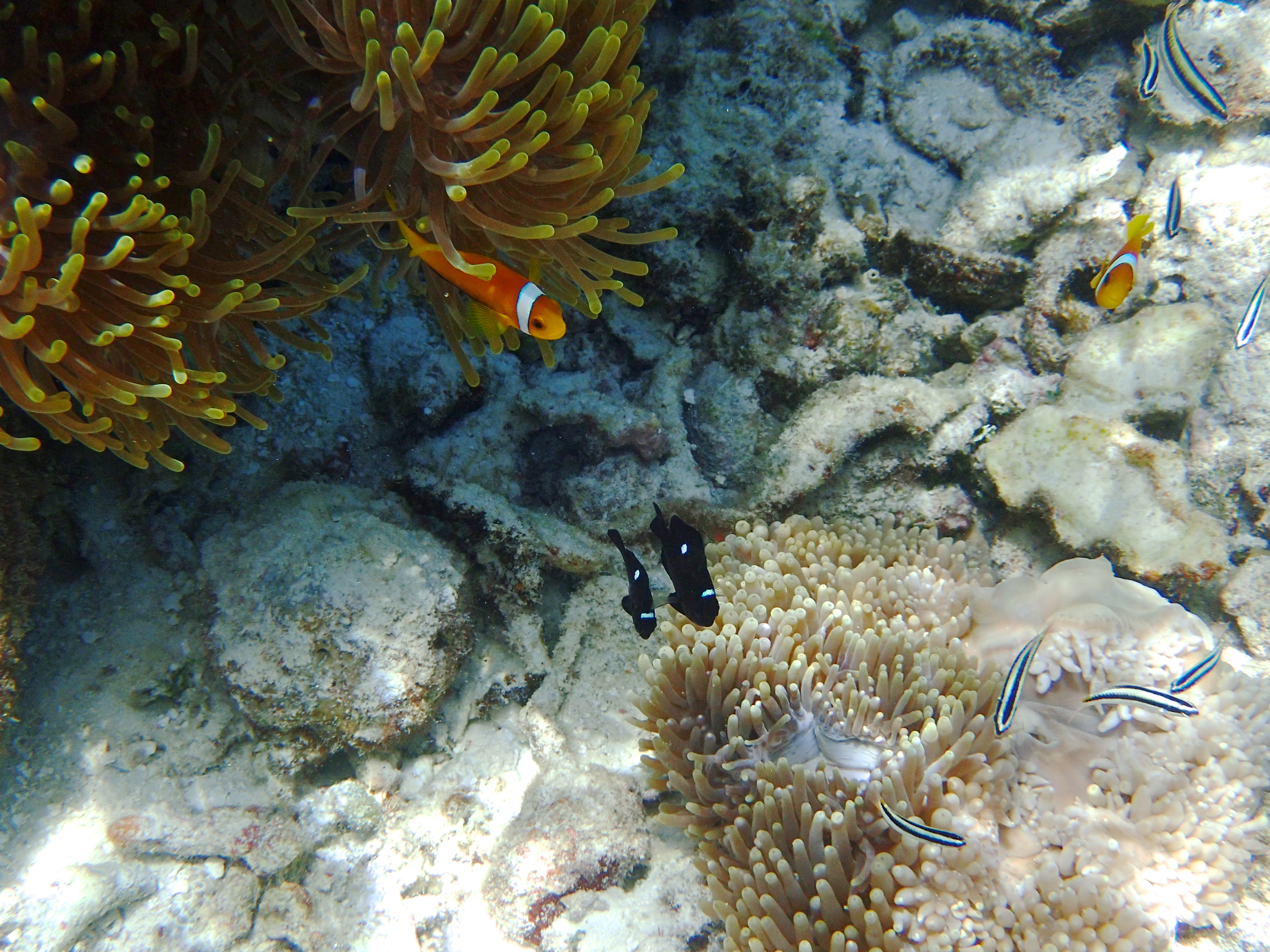
A pair of juvenile three-spot dascylluses with their anemone in the Maldives: A pair of black-foot anemonefish can be seen to the top.

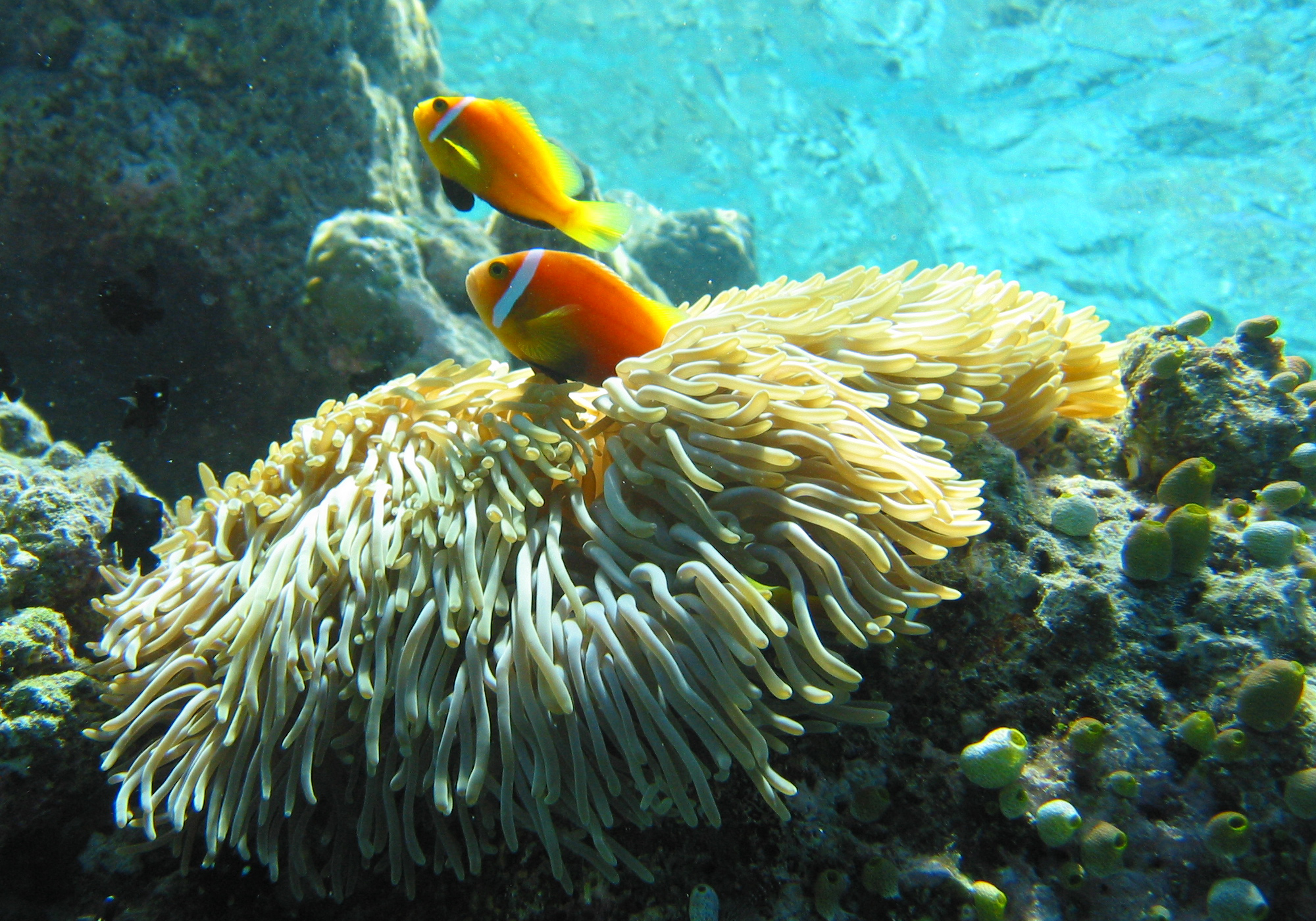
Juvenile threespot dascyllus (left) and a pair of Maldives anemonefish associated with the sea anemone Heteractis magnifica

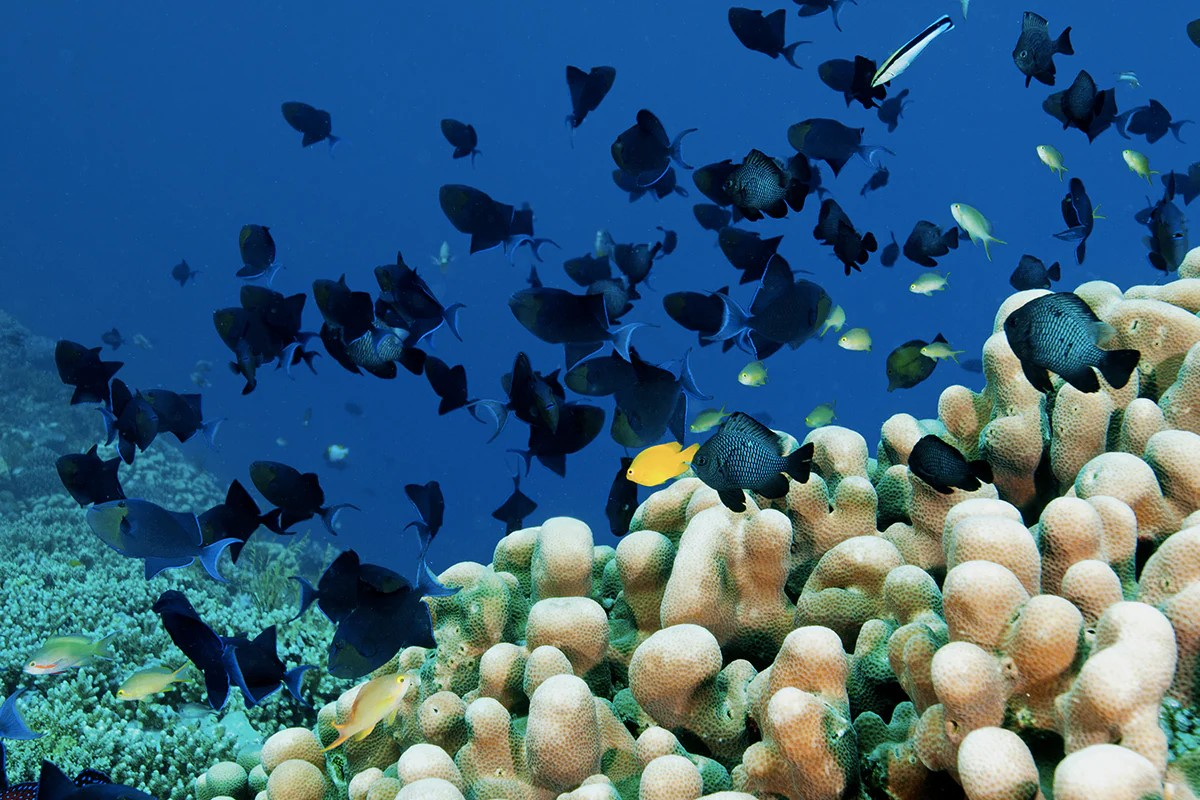
Shoals of threespot dascyllus fish at Wakatobi National Park
