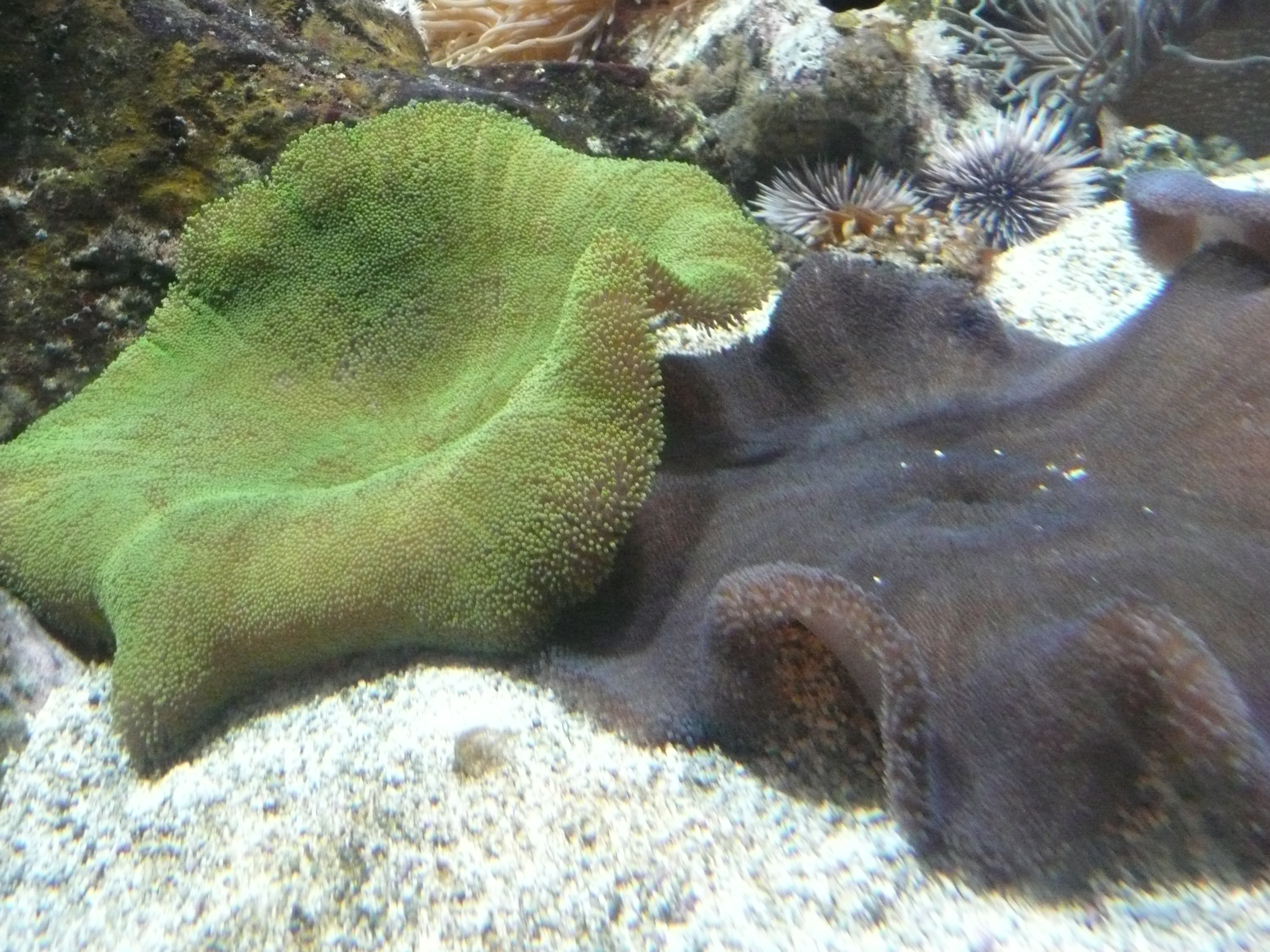

Scientific classification
- Kingdom: Animalia
- Phylum: Cnidaria
- Subphylum: Anthozoa
- Class: Hexacorallia
- Order: Actiniaria
- Family: Stichodactylidae
- Genus: Stichodactyla
- Species: S. haddoni

Binomial name
- Stichodactyla haddoni (Saville-Kent, 1893)

Synonyms
- Actinia gigantea (Forskål); Discosoma haddoni Saville-Kent, 1893; Stoichactis haddoni (Saville-Kent, 1893)

= Stichodactyla haddoni =

Species of sea anemone

Stichodactyla haddoni, commonly known as Haddon's sea anemone, is a species of sea anemone belonging to the family Stichodactylidae. It occurs in the Indo-Pacific region.

== Description ==
S. haddoni is characterized by a folded oral disc that reaches 50–80 cm (20–31 in) in diameter with a 1–2 cm (0.4–0.8 in) tentacle-free oral area. The tentacles have a rounded tip and the end may be green, yellow, gray, or rarely, blue and pink. The column, visible when the animal is closed, has small, non-adhesive bumps (verrucae) which are usually the same color as the column and not visible. The tentacles are yellowish or tan. At the circumference it has alternating short and long tentacles.

== Distribution and habitat ==
S. haddoni is found on sandy substrates and is widely distributed throughout the tropical and subtropical waters of the Indo-Pacific region, from Mauritius to Fiji and from the Ryukyu Islands of southern Japan to Australia.

== Biology ==
S. haddoni feeds in two ways. The first is internal, through photosynthesis carried out by symbiotic zooxanthellae living within its tissues. And the second is through capturing its prey via its tentacles that allow it to immobilize its prey (small invertebrates, fry or juvenile fish), by using toxins such as SHTX.

S. haddoni lives in association with six different species of clownfish:

- Amphiprion akindynos (Barrier reef anemonefish)
- A. chrysogaster (Mauritian anemonefish)
- A. chrysopterus (Orange-fin anemonefish)
- A. clarkii (Clark's anemonefish)
- A. polymnus (Saddleback anemonefish)
- A. sebae (Sebae anemonefish)

Juvenile Dascyllus trimaculatus also associate with S. haddoni. A number of other species are associated with S. haddoni, however the relationship is commensal rather than mutual as the species does not appear to benefit from the association. These species are

- Neopetrolisthes maculatus, a porcelain crab
- Shrimp from the genus Periclimenes
- Thor amboinensis, the squat or sexy shrimp

== As food ==
In Thailand, S. haddoni is called Hed lub (เห็ดหลุบ, "bob up and down mushroom") what with its appearance, which resembles a mushroom that pops up and down. On some islands, such as Ko Samui or Ko Pha-ngan, these sea anemones are used as an ingredient in a local seasonal dish called Kaeng kua (แกงคั่ว), even though they are protected animals in Thailand.

== Gallery ==
Anemonefish in S. haddoni

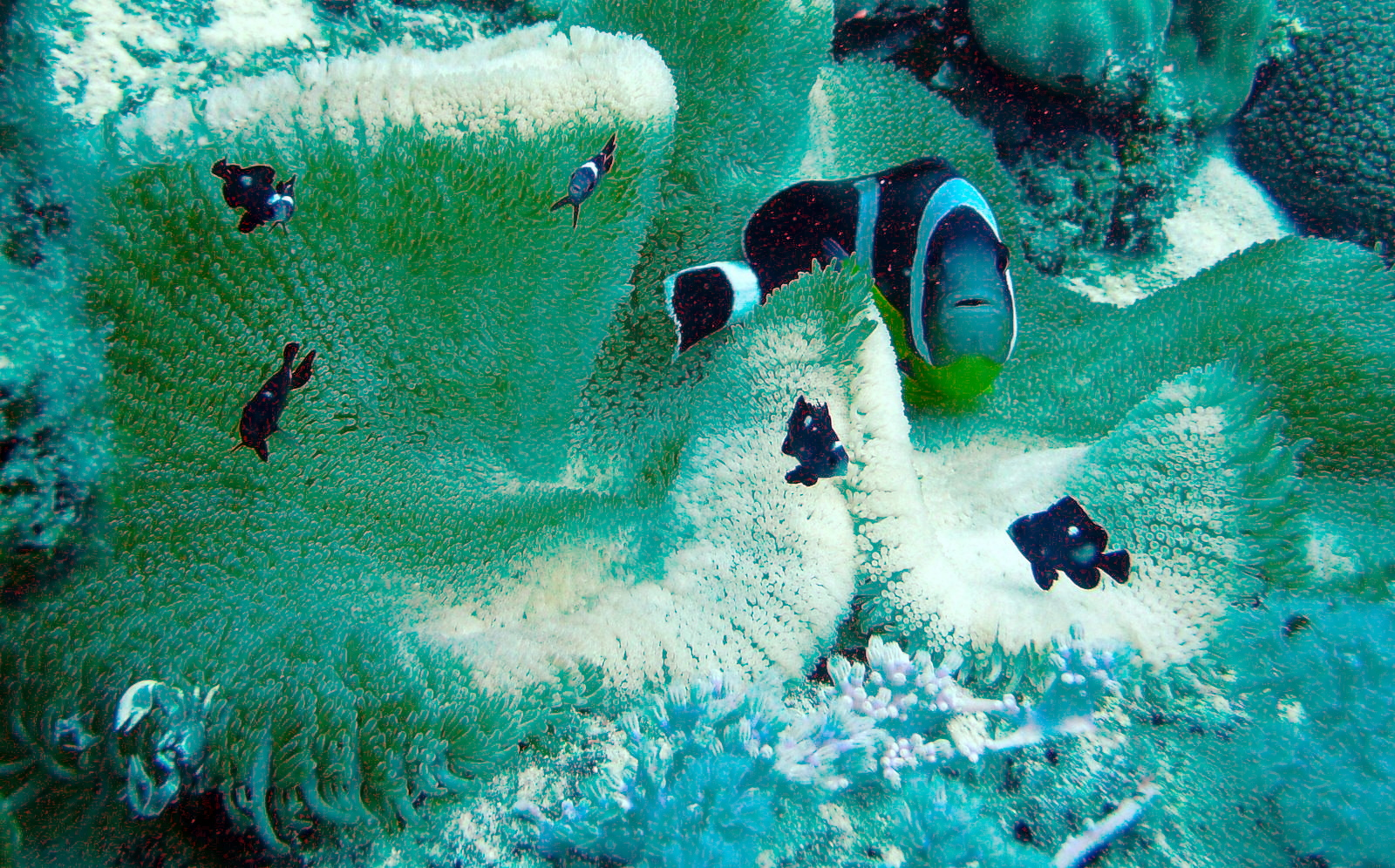
A. chrysogaster (Mauritian anemonefish) with juvenile Dascyllus trimaculatus

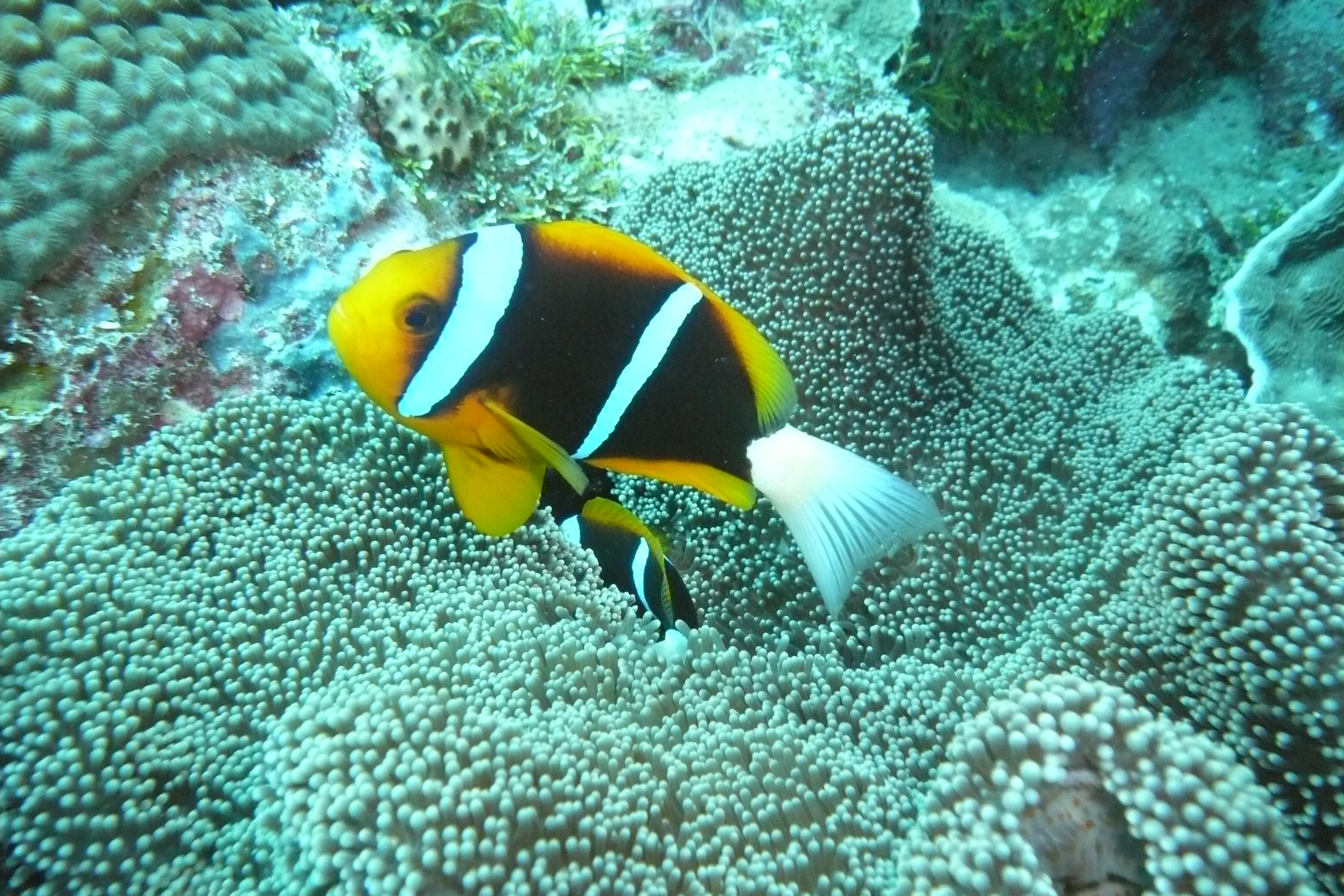
A. chrysopterus (Orange-fin anemonefish)

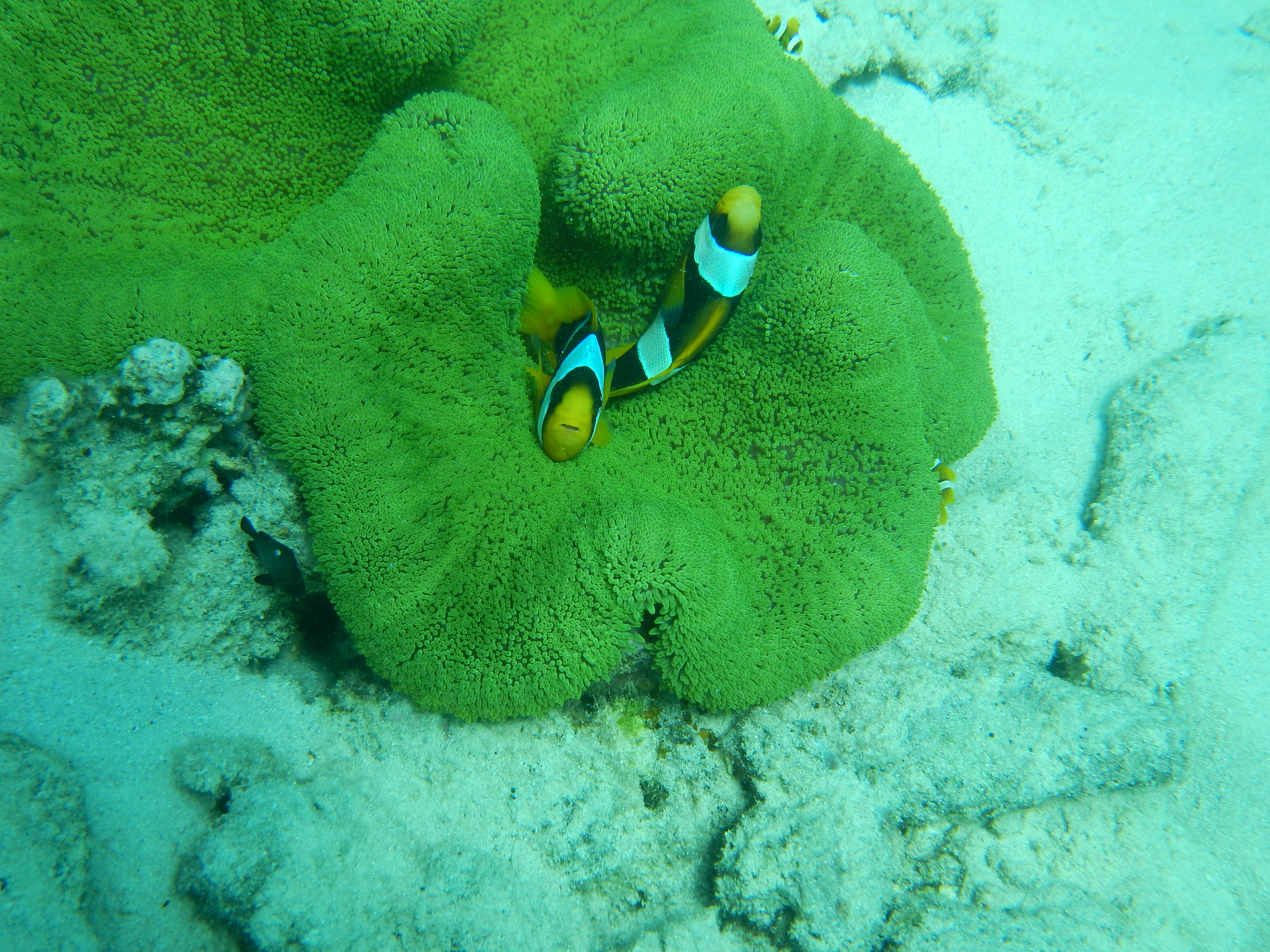
A. clarkii (Clark's anemonefish)

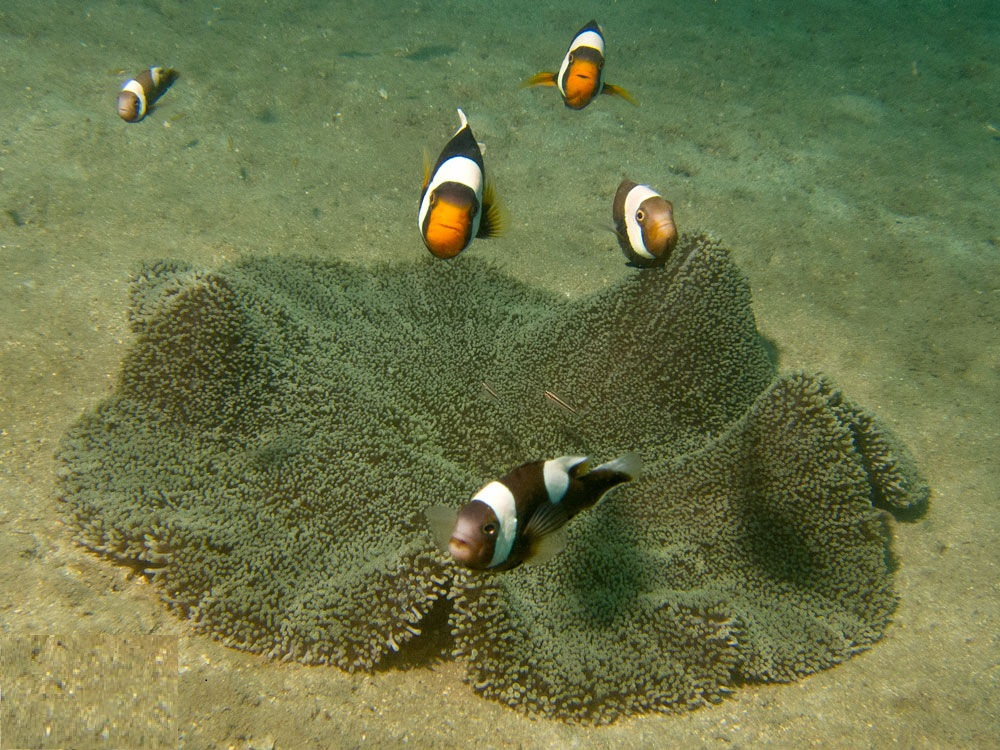
A. polymnus (Saddleback anemonefish)

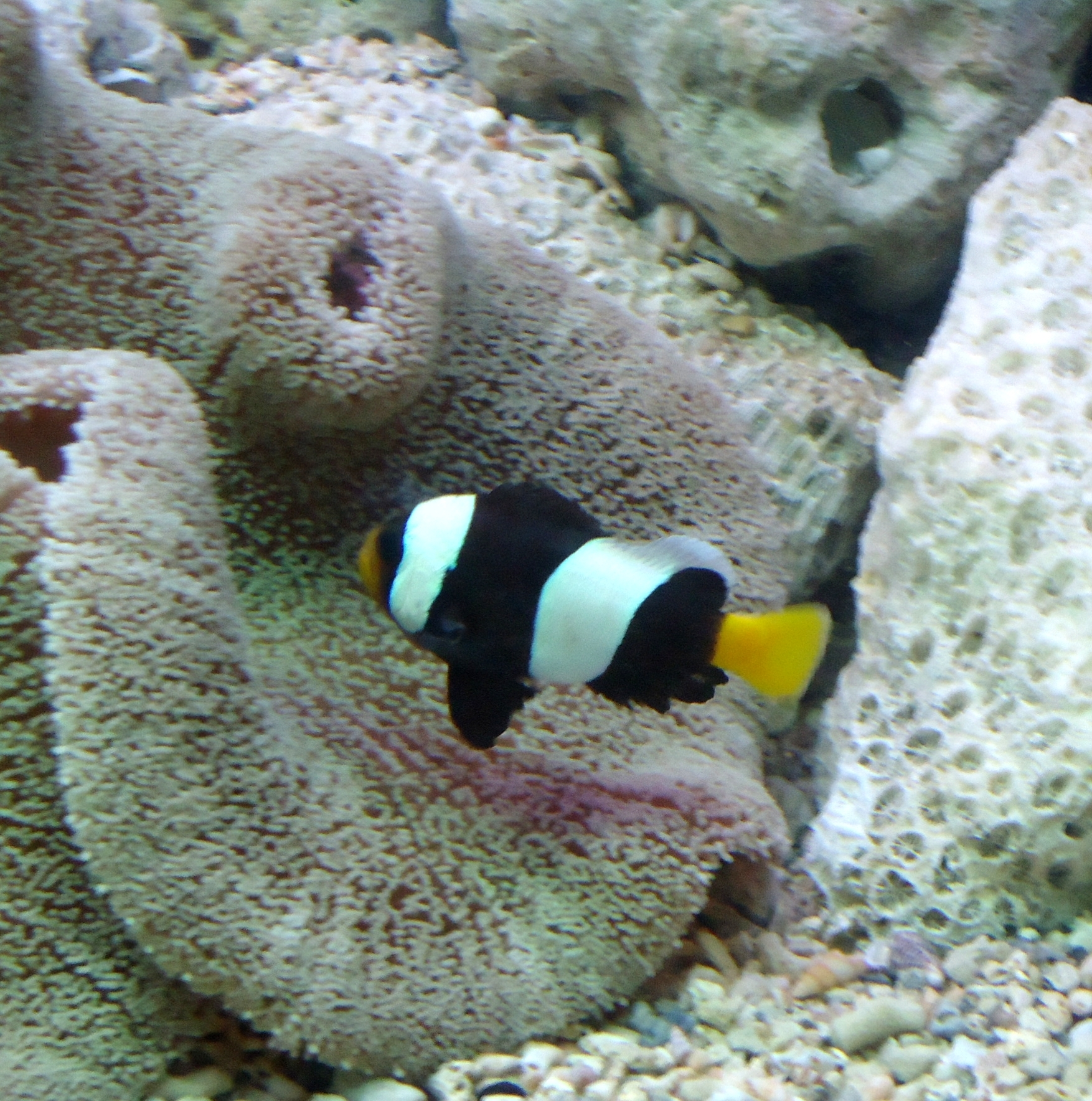
A. sebae (Sebae anemonefish)

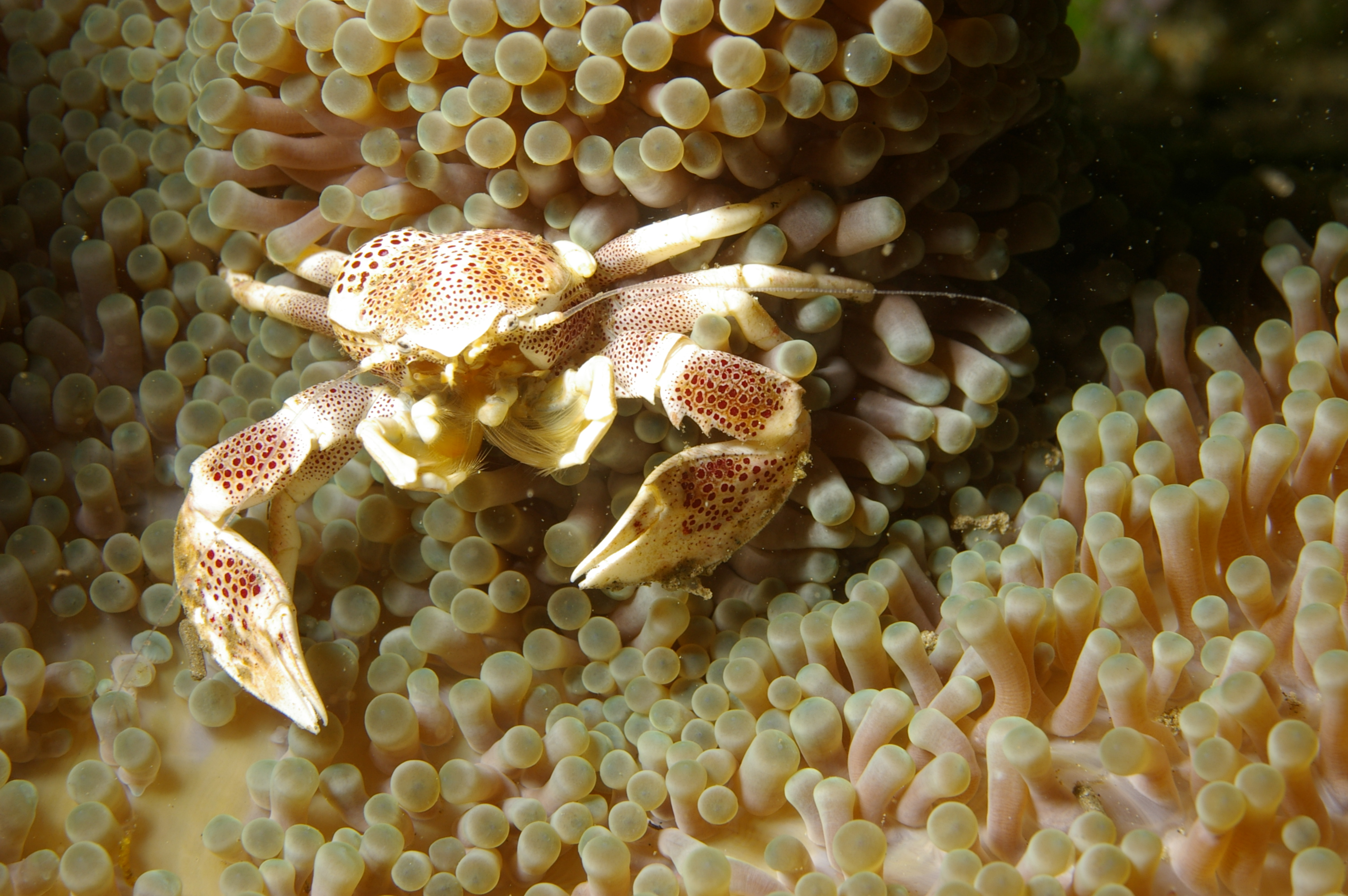
Neopetrolisthes maculatus (porcelain crab)

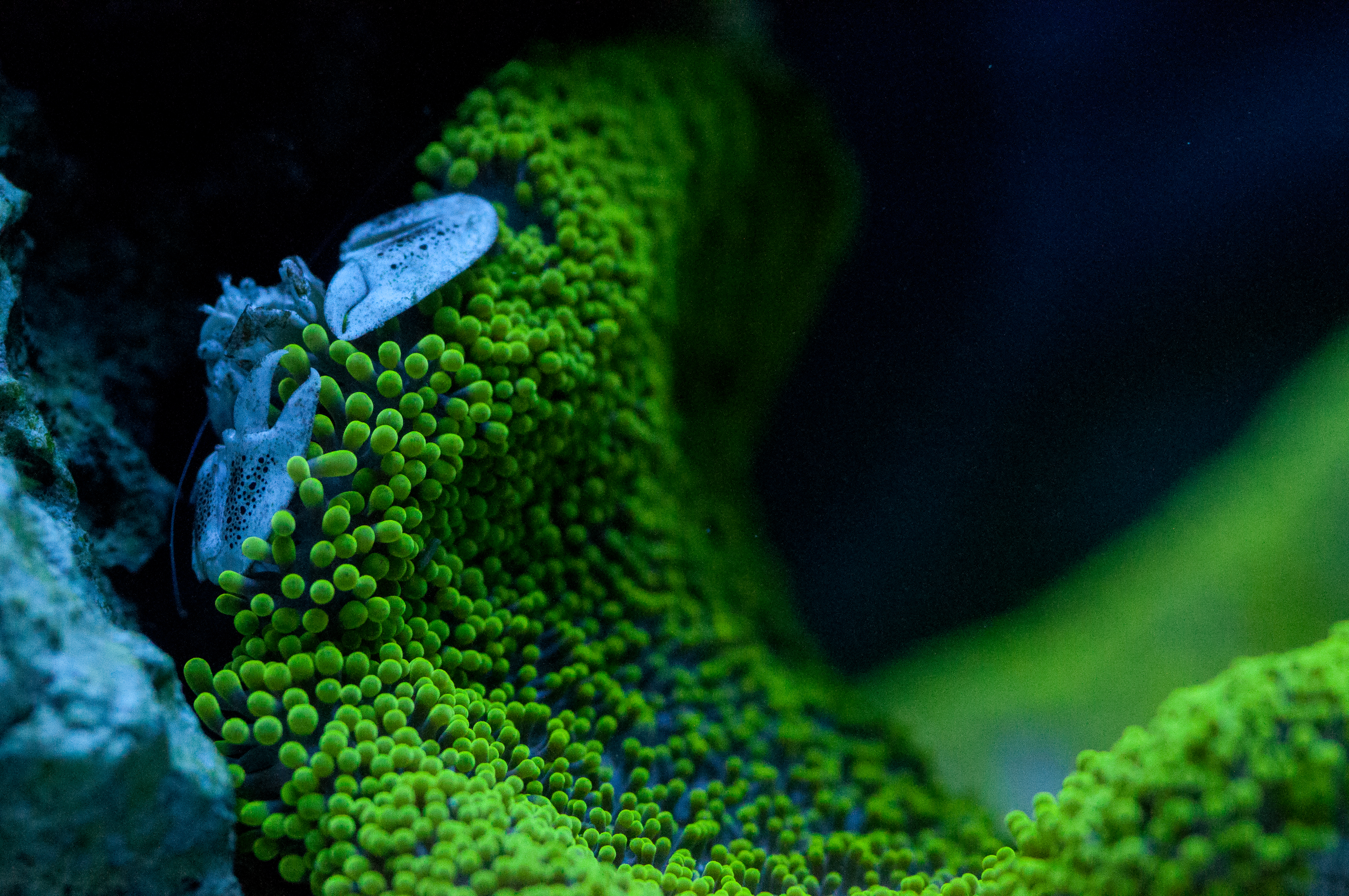
Neopetrolisthes maculatus (porcelain crab)

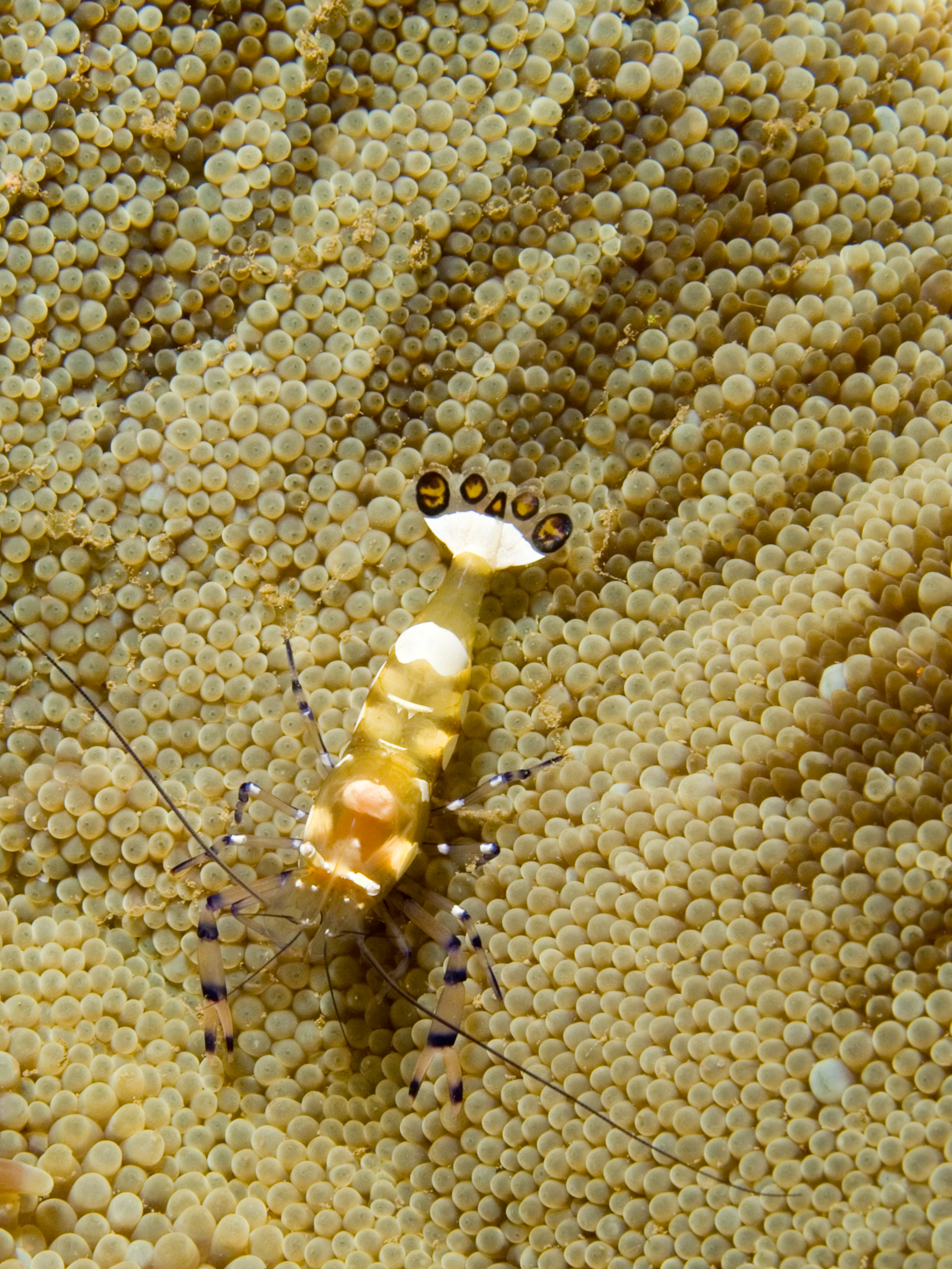
Periclimenes brevicarpalis (glass anemone shrimp)

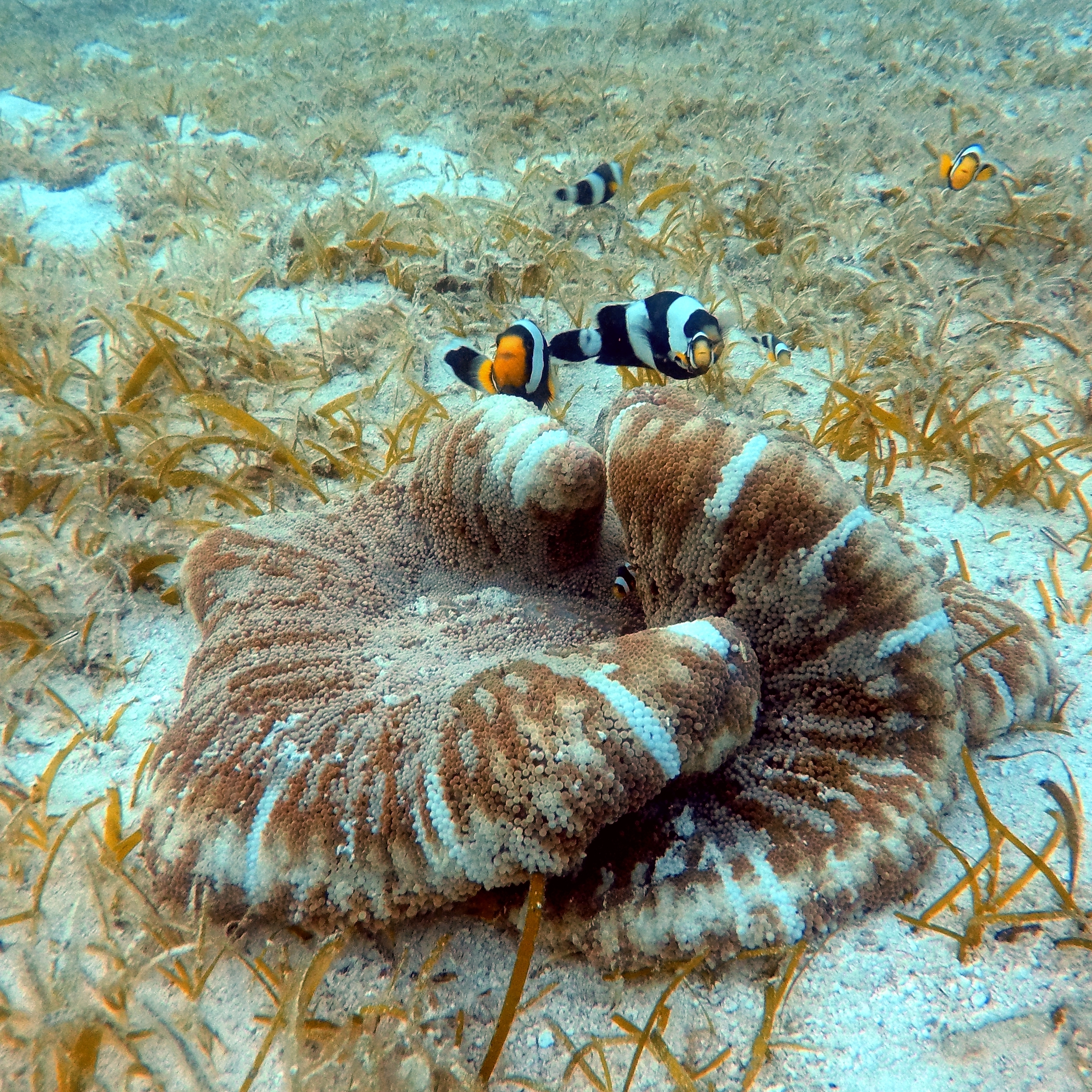
S. haddoni with A. polymnus
