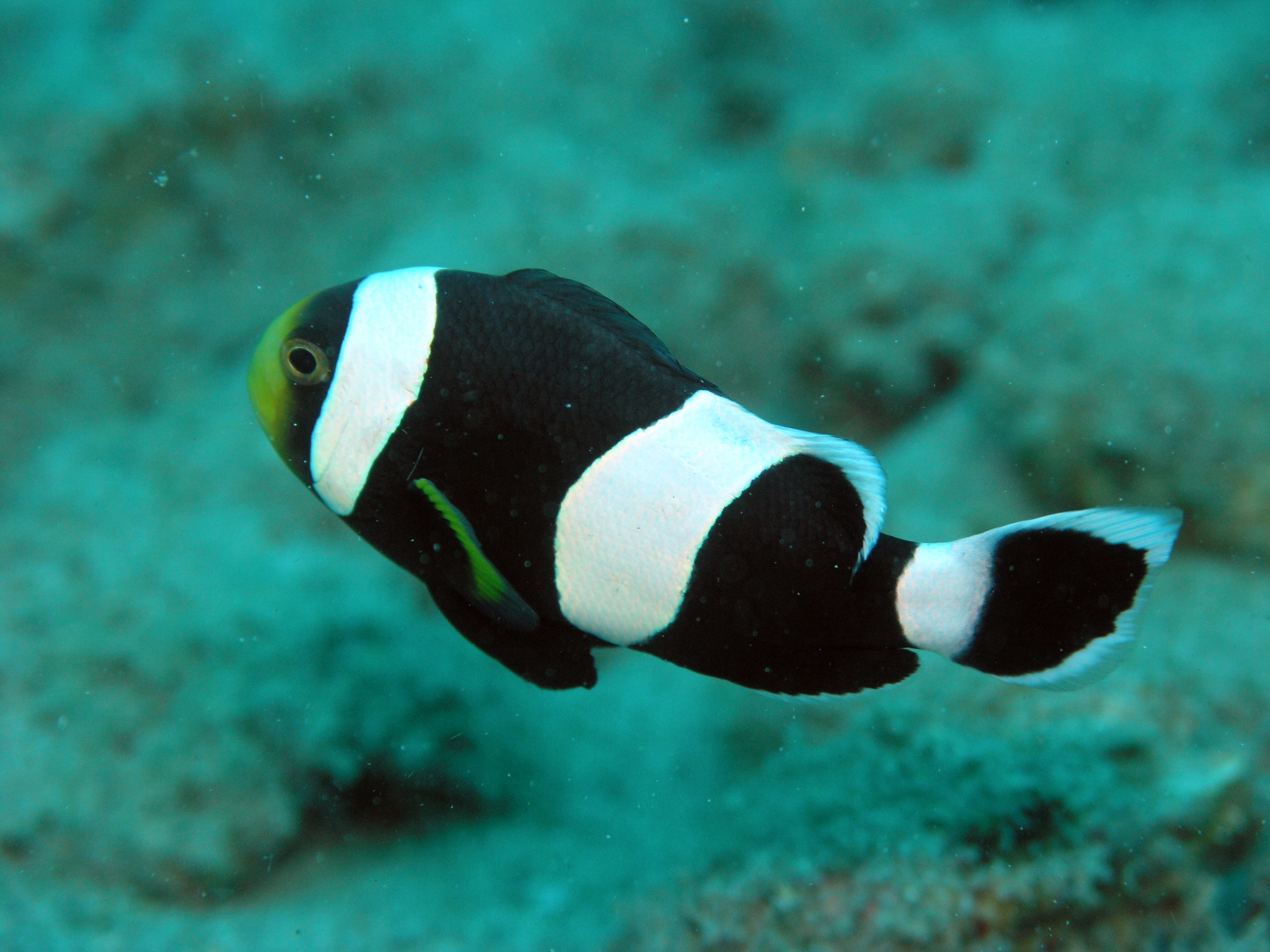

Conservation status
- Least Concern (IUCN 3.1)

Scientific classification
- Kingdom: Animalia
- Phylum: Chordata
- Class: Actinopterygii
- Division: Teleostei
- Order: Blenniiformes
- Family: Pomacentridae
- Genus: Amphiprion
- Species: A. polymnus

Binomial name
- Amphiprion polymnus (Linnaeus, 1758)

Synonyms
- List: Perca polymna Linnaeus, 1758; Sciaena unimaculata Meuschen, 1781; Coracinus unimaculata Meuschen, 1781; Anthias bifasciatus Bloch, 1792; Amphiprion bifasciatus (Bloch, 1792); Lutjanus jourdin Lacépède, 1802; Amphiprion laticlavius Cuvier, 1830; Amphiprion trifasciatus Cuvier, 1830; Amphiprion intermedius Schlegel & Müller, 1839; Paramphiprion hainanensis Wang, 1941

= Saddleback clownfish =

Species of fish

Amphiprion polymnus, also known as the saddleback clownfish or yellowfin anemonefish, is a black and white species of anemonefish with a distinctive saddle. Like all anemonefishes it forms a symbiotic mutualism with sea anemones and is unaffected by the stinging tentacles of the host anemone. It is a sequential hermaphrodite with a strict sized-based dominance hierarchy: the female is largest, the breeding male is second largest, and the male non-breeders get progressively smaller as the hierarchy descends. They exhibit protandry, meaning the breeding male will change to female if the sole breeding female dies, with the largest non-breeder becomes the breeding male.

== Distribution ==
A. polymnus is found in the center of the Indo-Pacific area, known as the Coral Triangle, from the Philippines to Indonesia and New Guinea.It is also found in northern Australia, Melanesia and to the Ryukyu Islands of southern Japan. Adults inhabit silty lagoons and harbour areas in depth range from 2 to 30 metres (6.6 to 98.4 ft).

== Description ==
A. polymnus is a small sized fish which grows up to 13 centimetres (5.1 in). In any anemonefish group, the female is always larger than the male, but in this species the male is almost equal in size to the female. Its body has a stock appearance, oval shape, compressed laterally and with a round profile. The body color ranges from dark brown to yellow orange and this species has two or three white bars. The white head bar is thick and located just behind the eyes. A large white abbreviated saddle shape or slanted white bar across the middle of the fish's body makes it quite obvious to see how it got the name Saddleback. In some varieties, typically those specimens initially associated with Heteractis crispa anemone, the saddle shape may extend up onto the fish's Dorsal fin with a third white bar or margin located across the caudal peduncle, (pictured in taxobox). The external edge of the caudal and the anal fins are underlined with a white line. The snout and the pectoral fin are in any case of color variation orange yellow to brownish orange.

=== Color variations ===
Melanistic variation has also been partially correlated with the fish's host anemone. Specimens associated with Heteractis crispa tend to be darker than those associated with Stichodactyla haddoni. Aquarium specimens have been observed becoming lighter or darker after accepting a new host anemone species, sometimes within a few hours.

=== Similar species ===
Historically anemonefish have been identified by morphological features, color pattern in the field, while in a laboratory other features such as scalation of the head, tooth shape and body proportions. These features have been used to group species into complexes and A. polymnus is part of the saddleback complex with A. sebae and A. latezonatus. Genetic analysis has shown that A. latezonatus did not fit within this clade and has a monospecific lineage. The yellow tail of A. sebae distinguishes that species from A. polymnus.

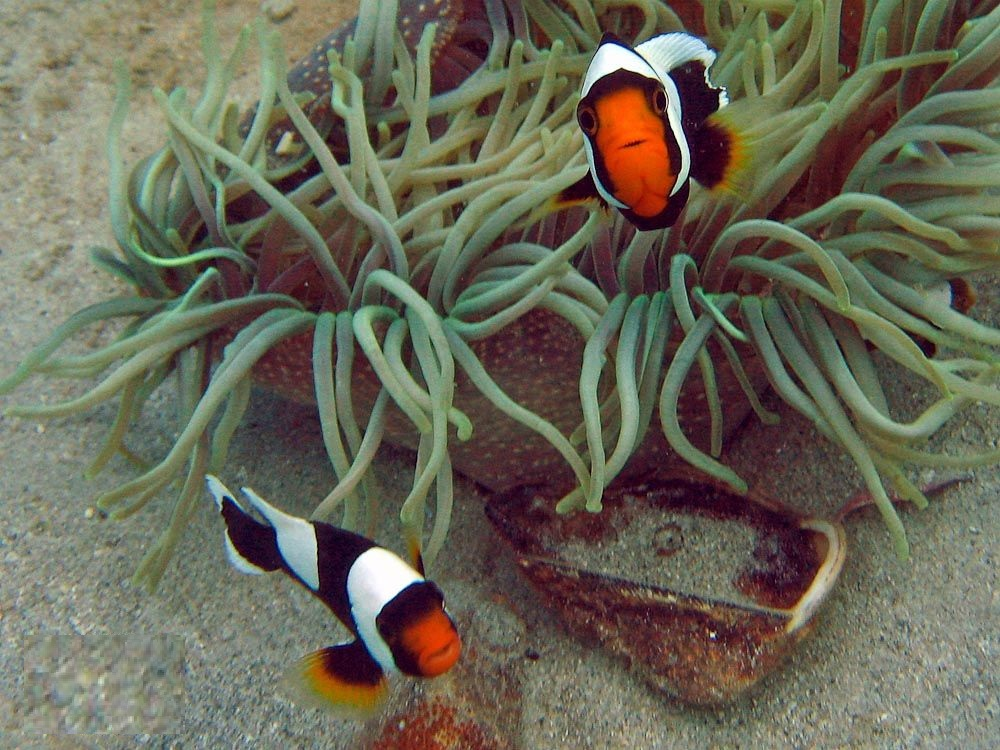
A. polymnus showing the similar sizes of male and female.

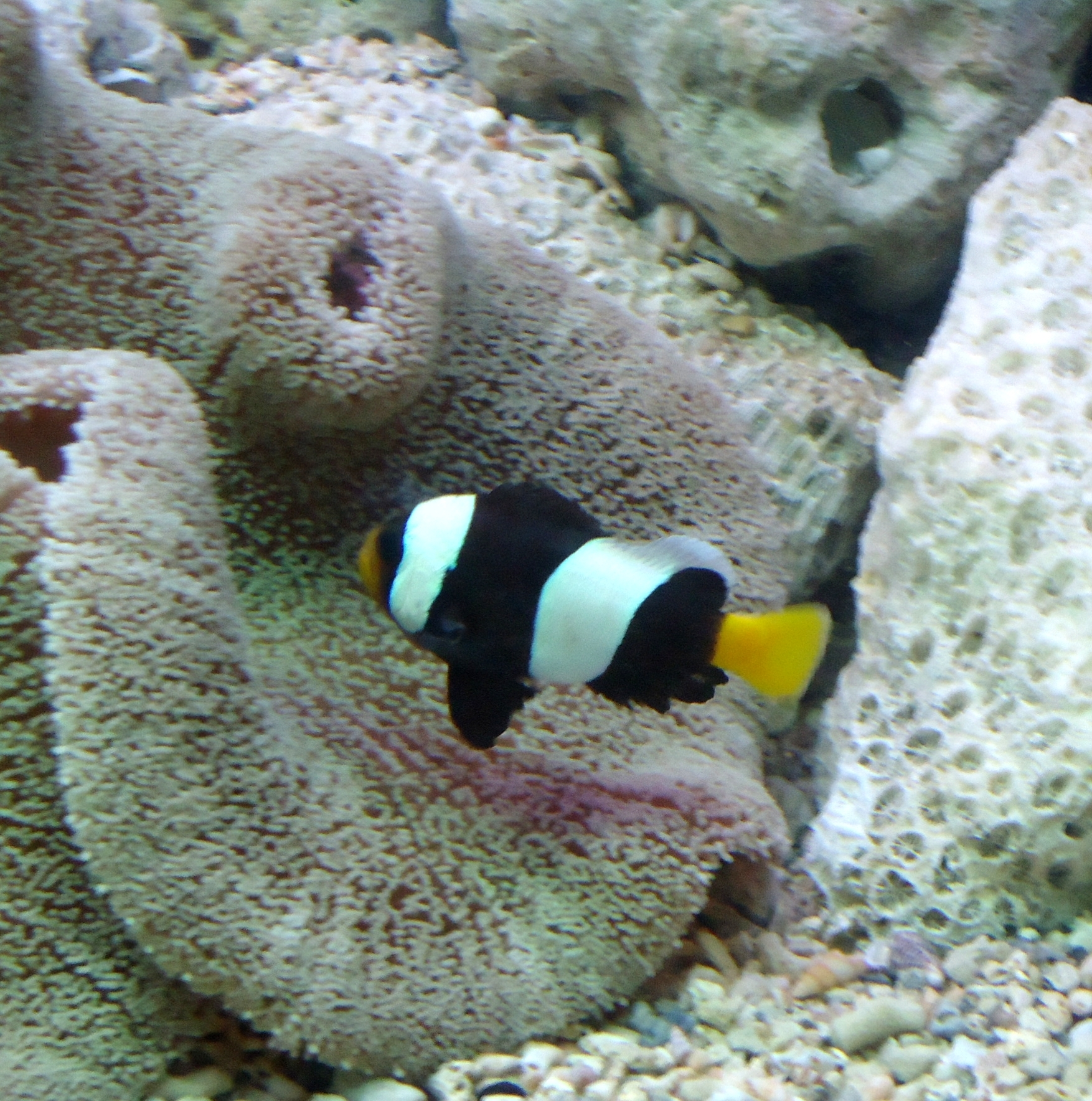
A. sebae is distinguished by its yellow tail.

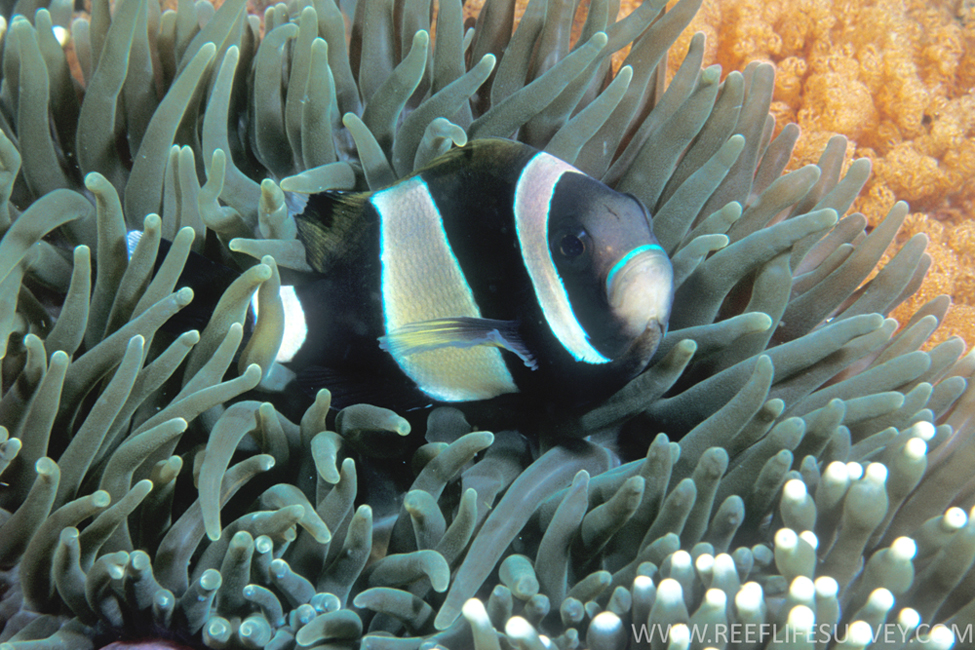
A. latezonatus

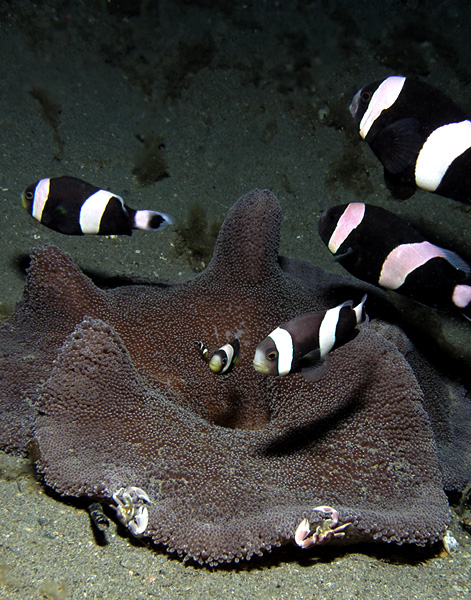
A group of saddleback anemonefish over Stichodactyla haddoni from East Timor.

== Ecology ==
=== Host anemones ===
The relationship between anemonefish and their host sea anemones is not random and instead is highly nested in structure. A. polymnus is a specialist, being hosted by 2 out of the 10 host anemones:

- Heteractis crispa Sebae anemone (rarely)
- Stichodactyla haddoni (Saddle carpet anemone)

=== Diet ===
Like all anemonefish, A. polymnus is omnivorous and its diet is based on zooplankton, small benthic crustaceans and algae.

=== Behaviour ===
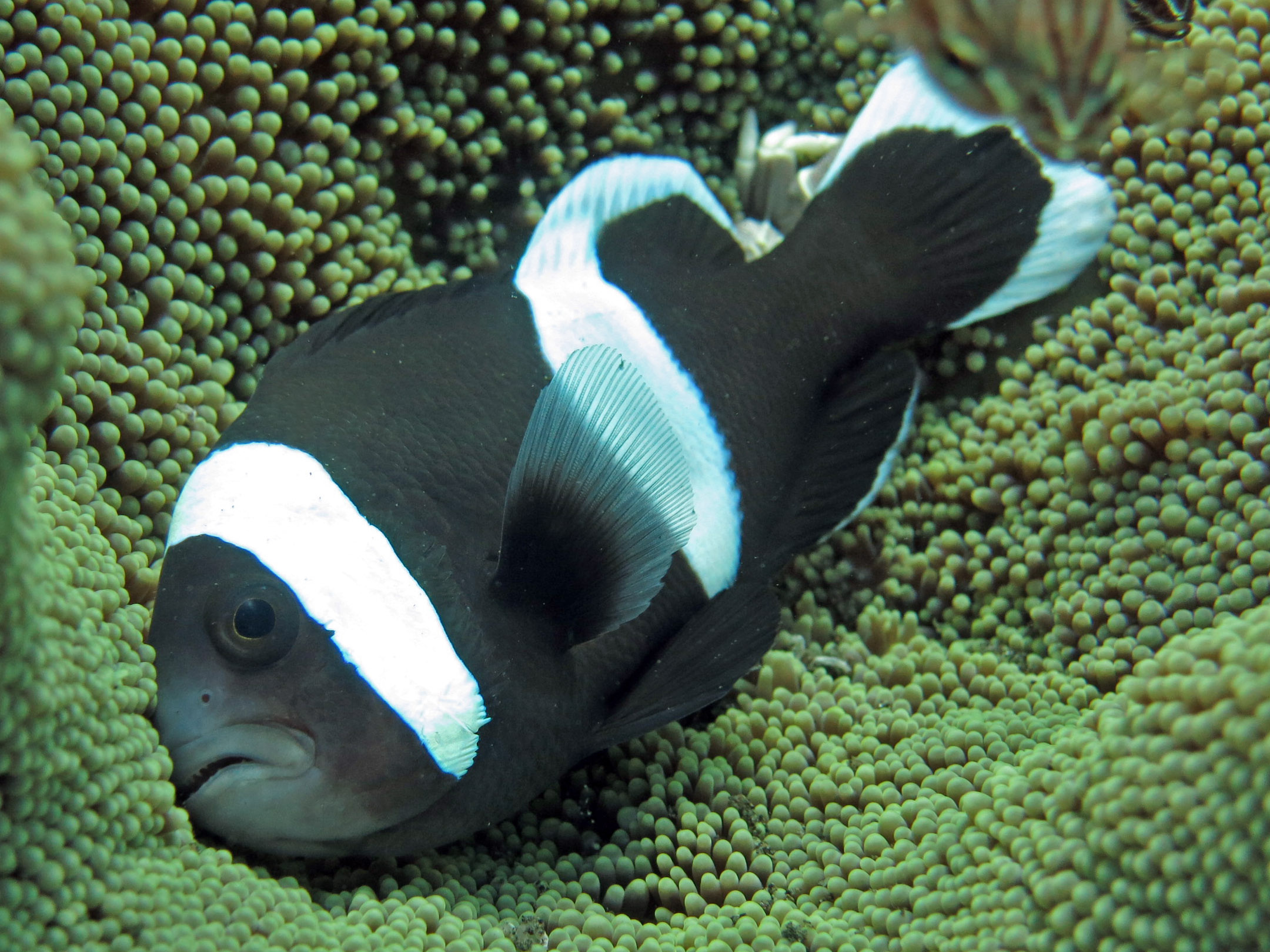
In Bali

A. polymnus has a diurnal activity, is aggressively territorial and is dependent on its host sea anemone which it uses as a shelter for the group and for the nest. The anemonefish can also defend the anemone against some reef fishes which could eat the tentacles such as butterflyfishes. Both species of sea anemone, which host A. polymnus, are known to bury themselves in the sand when they are under stress, leaving the fish vulnerable to predation. It has been suggested that the almost equal size of the male is an adaptation to allow it to elude predators by erratic swimming in the water column or covering the relatively long distance to shelter in coral rubble.

== Conservation status ==
Anemonefish and their host anemones are found on coral reefs and face similar environmental issues. Like corals, anemones contain intracellular endosymbionts, zooxanthellae, and can suffer from bleaching due to triggers such as increased water temperature or acidification. The other threat to anemonefish is collection for the marine aquarium trade where anemonefish make up 43% of the global marine ornamental trade, and 25% of the global trade comes from fish bred in captivity, while the majority are captured from the wild, accounting for decreased densities in exploited areas. While bleaching is a significant threat to anemonefish and their host anemones, there is evidence suggesting that collection compounds the localised impact of bleaching. This species was not evaluated in the 2012 release of the IUCN Red List.

== In the aquarium ==
A. polymnus has been bred in captivity. The protection of a host anemone is not required in an aquarium and attempting to keep either of the species of anemones commonly associated with this fish in a captive aquarium environment is not recommended, even for experienced aquarists. This is due to the poor survival rate of wild collected specimens and the overall shortened lifespans these normally centarian organisms often experience in captivity.
