= SHTX =

SHTX is a toxin derived from the sea anemone Stichodactyla haddoni; there are four different subtypes, SHTX I, II, III and IV. SHTX I, II and III can paralyze crabs by acting on potassium channels, while SHTX IV works on sodium channels, and is lethal to crabs.

== Sources ==
SHTX I, II, III and IV are toxins derived from the sea anemone Stichodactyla haddoni.

== Chemistry ==
SHTX I and II consist of 28 amino acids. SHTX I and II have been classified as members of the type IV potassium channel toxin family. The protein sequences of SHTX I and II differ only at amino acid position 6, where the SHTX I protein contains a hydroxyproline and SHTX II contains a proline. SHTX I contains two disulfide bridges between Cys-7 and -19 and between Cys-10 and -25., whereas most peptide toxins derived from sea anemones have three disulfide bridges. Because of the extensive homology between SHTX I and II, it is plausible that SHTX II will share the location of the disulfide bridges. SHTX I and II also share homology with Am I, a toxin isolated from the sea anemone Antheopsis maculata. These proteins have the same positions of cysteines in their amino acid sequences, which points towards a comparable structure. Am I is toxic to crabs and is lethal in high doses (LD_{50} 830 μg/kg), but the target of this toxin is still unknown.

The protein SHTX III is a Kunitz-type protease inhibitor, with a length of 62 amino acids. It shows homology to other members of the Kunitz-type protease inhibitor family and the highest similarity is shown with AEPI-I, a toxin derived from the sea anemone Actinia equina.

SHTX IV is composed of 48 amino acids and is a member of the type 2 sea anemone sodium channel toxin family. The protein shares homology with the other members of this family, especially with the toxin Rp II from the sea anemone Radianthus paumotensis. The amino acid glycine at the C-terminus of the SHTX IV protein is deleted after completing translation. As a result, the mature protein has an amidated lysine at its C-terminus instead of a glycine.

The amino acid sequences of the subtypes of SHTX. Unknown amino acids are listed as 'X' and hydroxyproline is listed as 'O'.
Toxin	Amino acid sequence
SHTX I	X I I G A O C R R C Y H S D G K G G C V R D W S C G Q Q
SHTX II	X I I G A P C R R C Y H S D G K G G C V R D W S C G Q Q
SHTX III	T E E M P A L C H L Q P D V P K C R G Y F P R Y Y Y N P E V G K C E Q F I Y G G C G G N K N N F V S F E A C R A T C I I P L
SHTX IV	A A C K C D D D G P D I R S A T L T G T V D F W N C N E G W E K C T A V Y T A V A S C C R K K K

== Target ==
SHTX II acts on voltage-gated potassium channels and was reported to be approximately 50 times less potent than ^{125}I-a-dendrotoxin to synaptosomal membranes, with an IC_{50} of 270 nM. The affinity and target of SHTX I has not been assessed yet, however, due to the similarities of SHTX I with SHTX II in both sequence and crab paralyzing activity, it is considered to show the same affinity to potassium channels as SHTX II.

SHTX III is known to be a Kunitz-type protease inhibitor and a potassium (Kv1.2) channel blocker. It was reported to be approximately 110 times less potent than ^{125}I-a-dendrotoxin to synaptosomal membranes, with an IC_{50} of 650 nM.

SHTX IV is a type 2 sea anemone sodium channel toxin and shows 91% sequence overlap with Rp II from the sea anemone R. paumotensis. The affinity of SHTX IV to sodium channels has not been studied yet. However, the affinity of the toxin would most likely depend on the species, the issue and state of innervation it is exposed to.

== Mode of action ==
The modes of action of SHTX I and II are currently unknown.

SHTX III has a Kunitz-domain and therefore has a protease inhibitor. In sea anemones, it has been suggested that these protease inhibitors are to protect the toxins injected to the prey and contribute to the paralysis. It also works on potassium (Kv1.2) channels as a blocker, the precise mechanism is still unknown.

SHTX IV is a type 2 sea anemone sodium channel toxin, of which the mode of action has not been studied yet. However, due to the high similarity in its sequence with Rp II it might be possible that it shares the same effect, which is prolonging the inactivation of the sodium channel.

== Toxicity ==
SHTX I, II, III and IV are tested on crabs to reveal their paralytic activity (ED_{50}) and lethal activity (LD_{50}). SHTX I, II and III are not lethal to crabs, but they induce paralysis. The values of ED_{50} are 430 μg/kg for SHTX I and II and 183 μg/kg for SHTX III. However, SHTX IV can be lethal to crabs, with an estimated LD_{50} of 93 μg/kg.

Contact with the sea anemone S. haddoni can induce an anaphylactic shock.

== Treatment ==
No specific treatment is available for intoxication with SHTX I, II, III or IV. In addition, it is not known what the specific symptoms of an intoxication with one of these toxins are in humans, since the effects of these toxins have only been tested on crabs.
