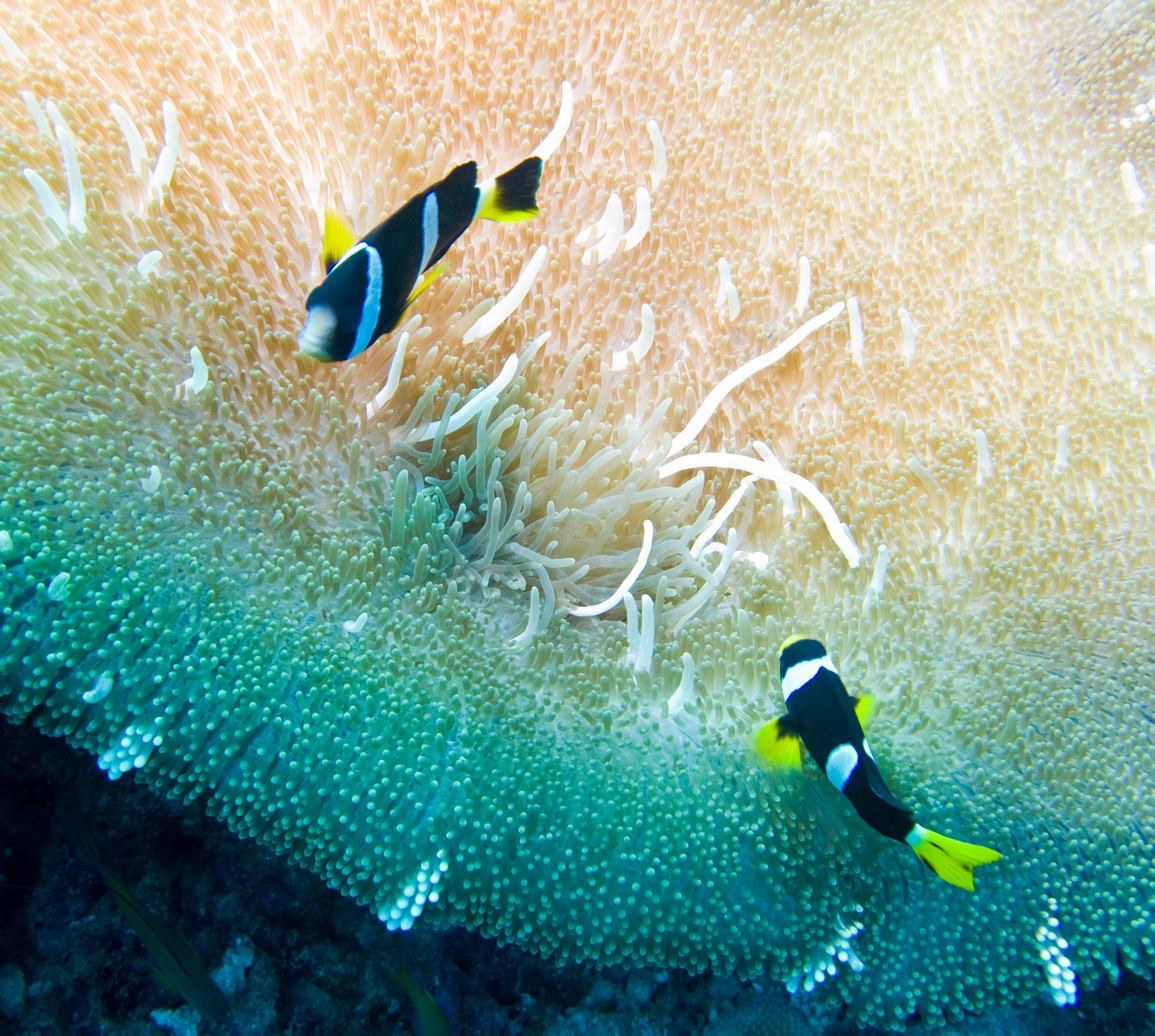

Conservation status
- Least Concern (IUCN 3.1)

Scientific classification
- Kingdom: Animalia
- Phylum: Chordata
- Class: Actinopterygii
- Order: Blenniiformes
- Family: Pomacentridae
- Genus: Amphiprion
- Species: A. sebae

Binomial name
- Amphiprion sebae Bleeker, 1853

= Sebae clownfish =

Species of fish

Amphiprion sebae, also known as the sebae clownfish, is an anemonefish found in the northern Indian Ocean, from Java to the Arabian Peninsula. Like all anemonefish it is usually found living in association with sea anemones. While the common name of Heteractis crispa, the sebae anemone, suggests an association, it is normally found with the Stichodactyla haddoni or saddle anemone. A. sebae, like all anemonefish, lives in a symbiotic relationship with the host anemone where the fish is unaffected by the stinging tentacles of the anemone. In a group of clownfish, Only two clownfish, a male and a female, in a group reproduce through external fertilization. Clownfish are sequential hermaphrodites, changing from male to female, with a strict dominance hierarchy and only the largest fish being female.

== Description ==
The body of A. sebae is blackish or dark brown with a yellow snout, breast and belly. It has two broad white bars., with the mid-body bar angled backwards. The tail is yellow or orange. They have 10–11 dorsal spines, 2 anal spines, 14–17 dorsal soft rays and 13–14 anal soft rays. They can grow to 14 centimetres (5.5 in).

=== Color variations ===
There is a melantistic variation where the fish lacks the yellow snout, breast and belly. It is not known whether this variation is associated with a species of anemone.

=== Similar species ===
A. polymnus (Saddleback anemonefish) is similar, but can be distinguished by its characteristic black or dark wedge shape on the tail. There are reports of A. sabae being incorrectly labeled in the aquarium trade as A. clarkii, however the similarities are superficial in that, while a melanistic variation of A. clarkii has similar color, A. clarkii lacks the characteristic sloping mid-band.

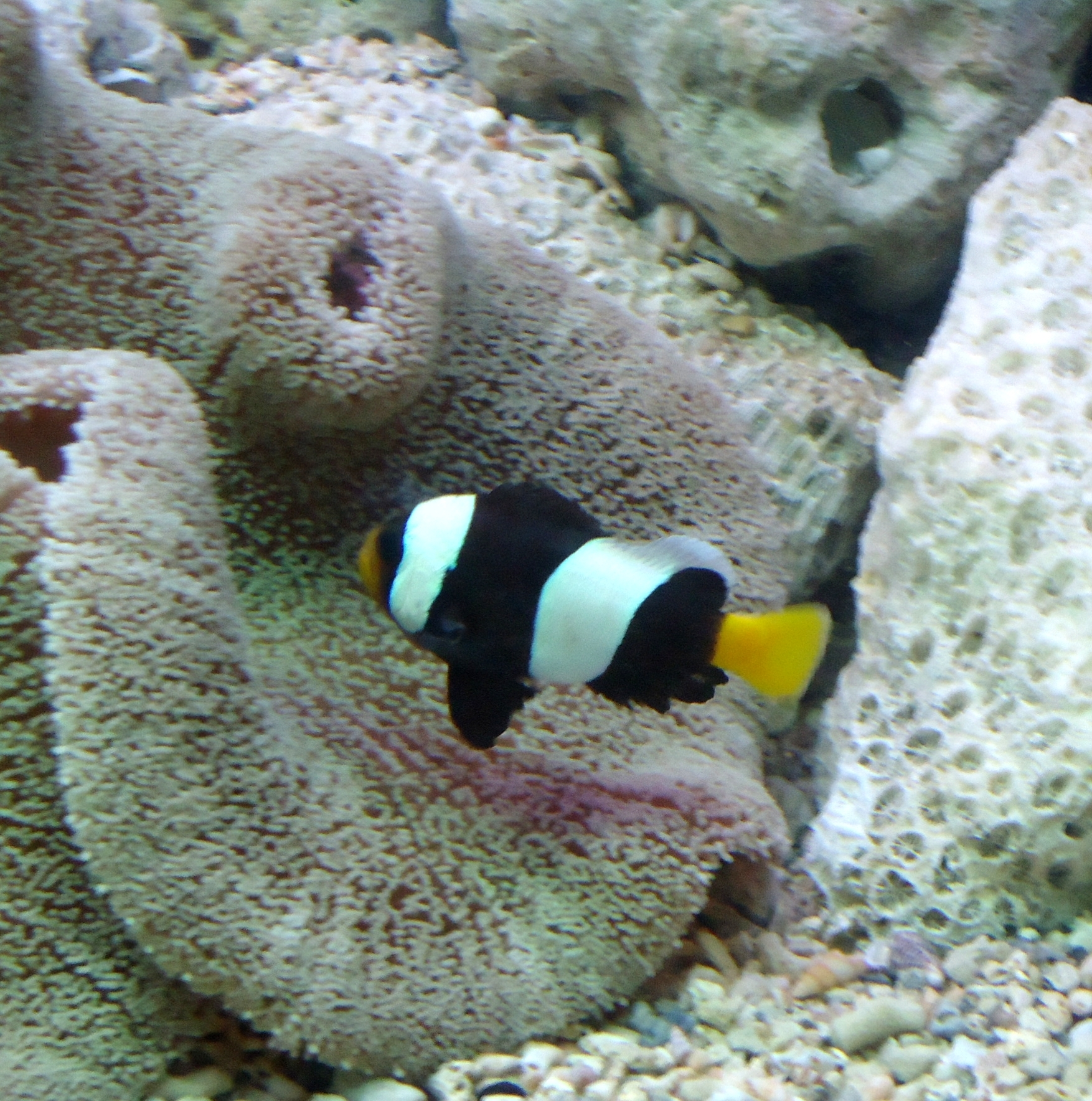
Melanistic variation of A. sebae (Sebae anemonefish)

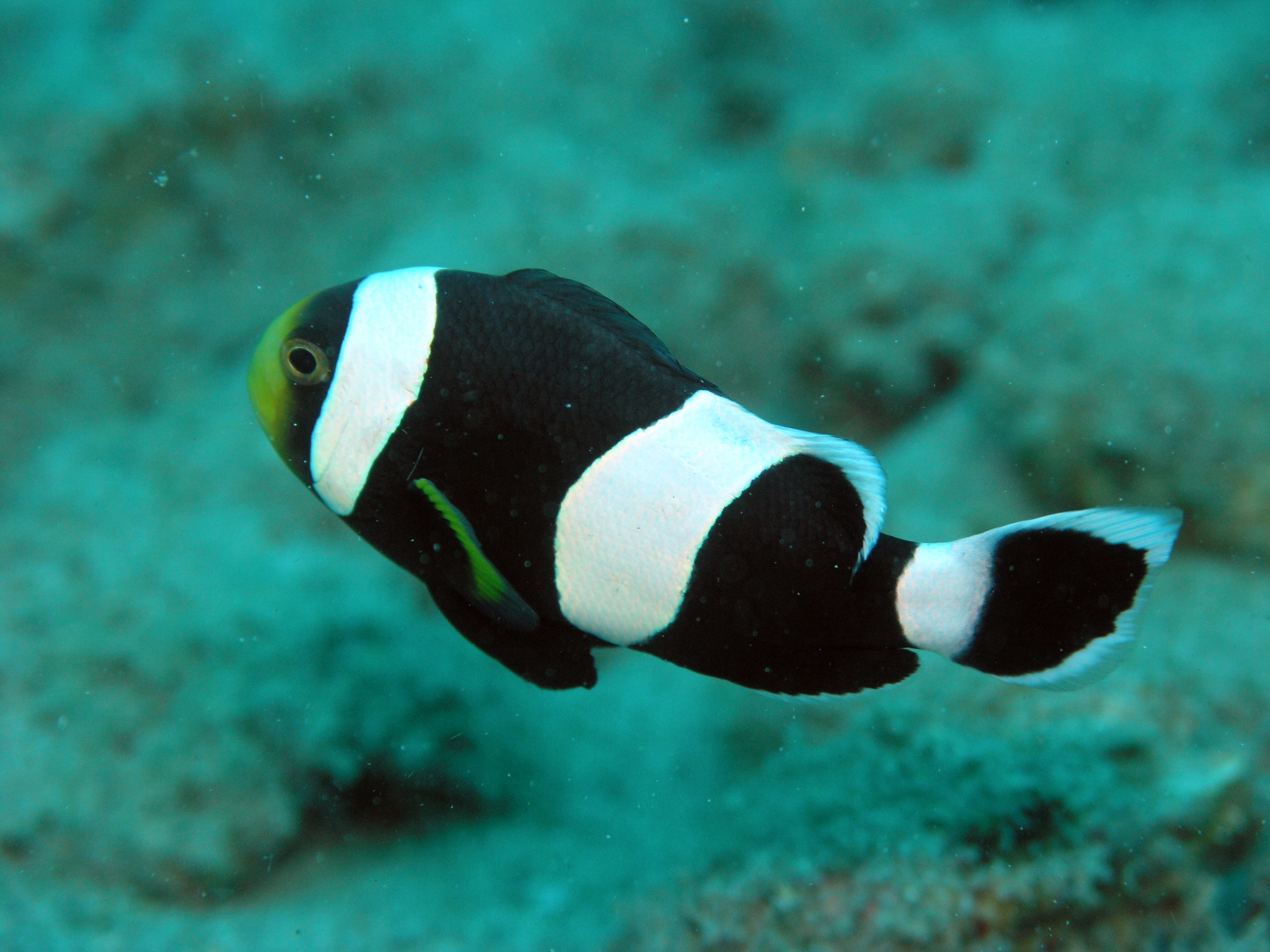
A. polymnus (Saddleback anemonefish) showing the characteristic wedge on the tail

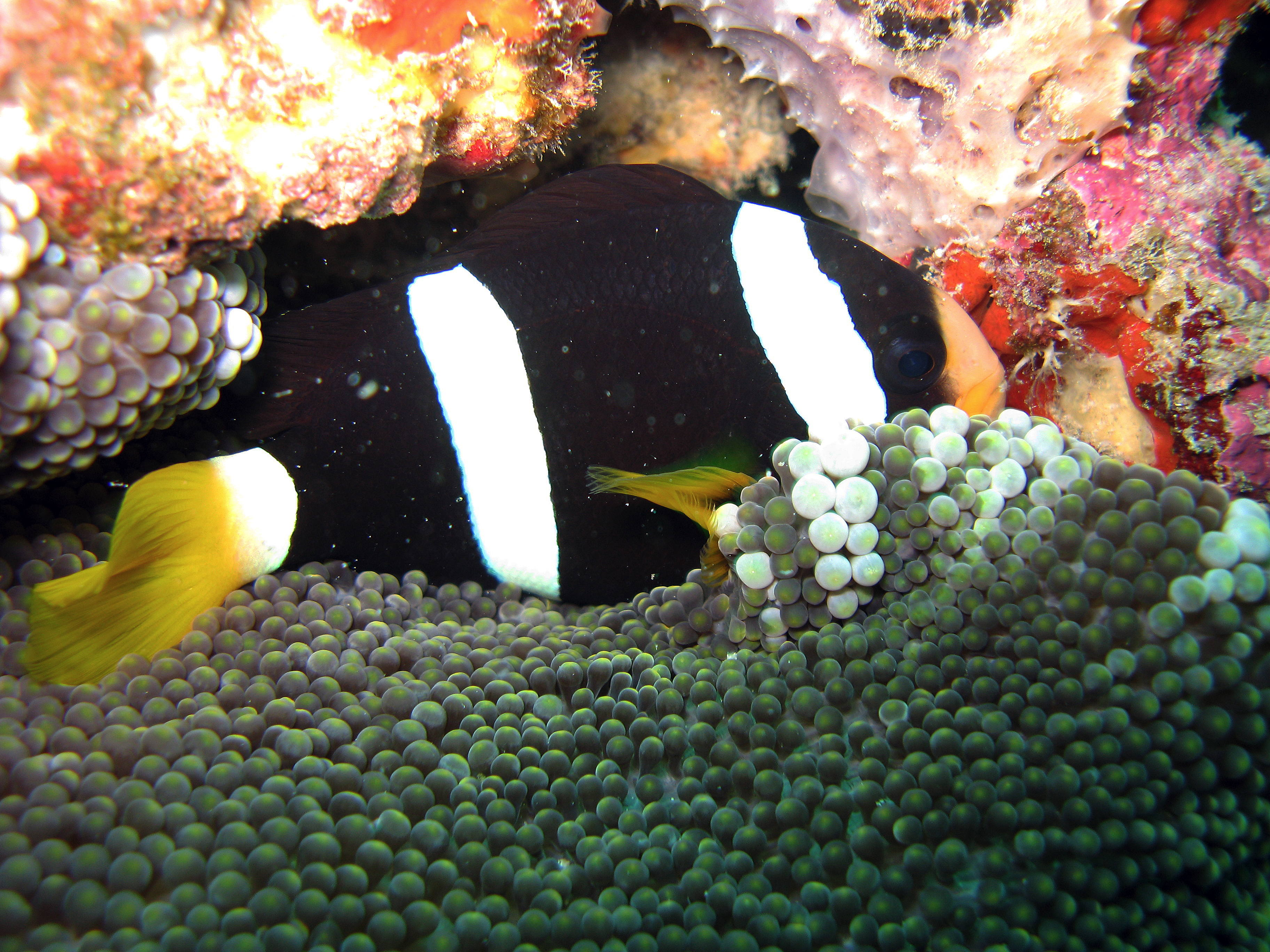
the superficially similar melanistic variation of A. clarkii lacking the characteristic sloping mid-band

== Distribution and habitat ==
A. sebae is found in the northern Indian Ocean, from Java to the Arabian Peninsula, including India, Sri Lanka, the Maldives, Sumatra, and the Andaman Islands.

=== Host anemones ===
A. sebae is associated with the following species of anemone:

- Stichodactyla haddoni

== Life cycle ==
A study using estuarine water was done to look at captive breeding and larval rearing of the species Amphiprion sebae. The male starts courting the female a week before they spawn. The male initiates maintenance of the site chosen for habitation. The female enters the nest to lay her eggs. About 300 to 600 eggs are laid. The males usually guard the eggs, which hatch after six to eight days. The yolk sacs of the larvae were small. Between the third and fourth day they fed and their body shape changed. On days fifteen to eighteen in their life cycle they enter metamorphosis.

Eggs

When A. sebae eggs are recently fertilized, they are transparent (yellow/clear) with oil droplets. Amphiprion sebae eggs mature, they become bright yellow to orange color, the size of the eggs can range from length: 1.7- 2.6 mm and width: 0.8-1.3 mm.
