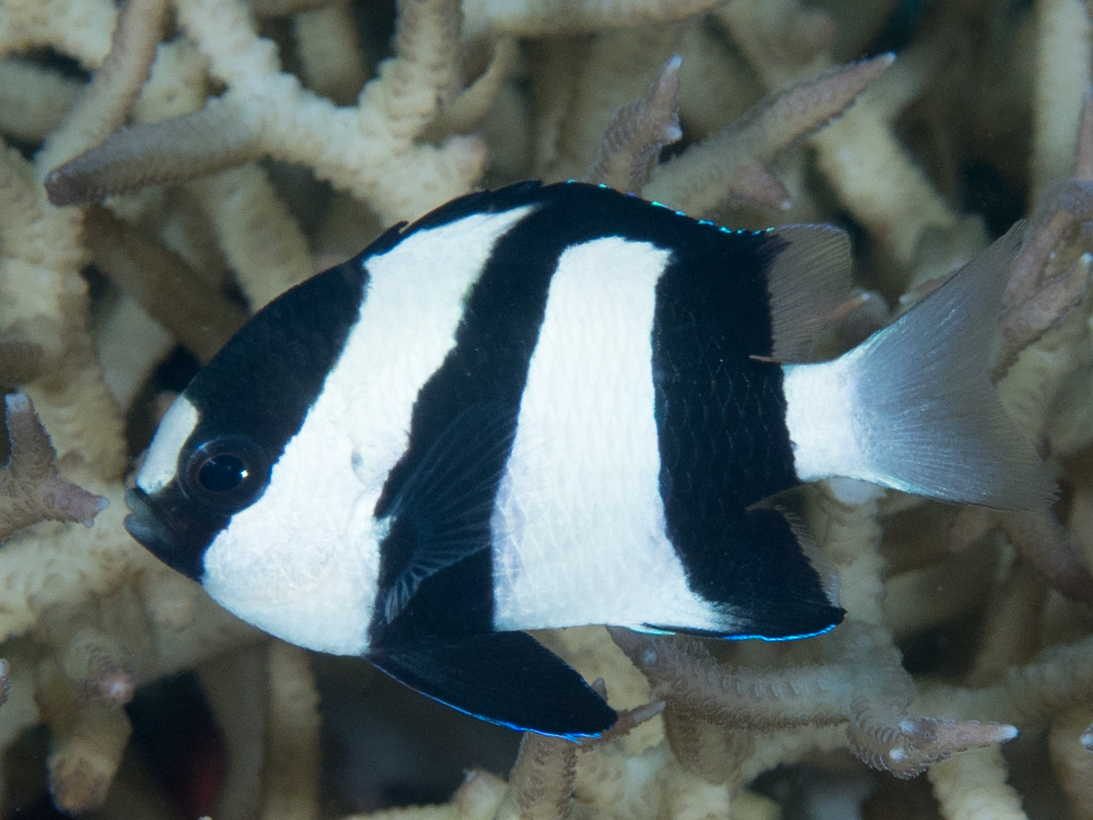

Conservation status
- Least Concern (IUCN 3.1)

Scientific classification
- Kingdom: Animalia
- Phylum: Chordata
- Class: Actinopterygii
- Order: Blenniiformes
- Family: Pomacentridae
- Genus: Dascyllus
- Species: D. aruanus

Binomial name
- Dascyllus aruanus (Linnaeus, 1758)

Synonyms
- List: Tetradrachmum arcuatum Cantor, 1850; Chaetodon aruanus Linnaeus, 1758; Tetradrachmum aruanum (Linnaeus, 1758); Chaetodon arcuanus Gmelin, 1789; Pomacentrus emamo Lesson, 1831; Dascyllus blochii Castelnau, 1875; Pomacentrus trifasciatus De Vis, 1884; Pomacentrus devisi D.S. Jordan & Seale, 1906; Abudefduf caroli Curtiss, 1938

= Whitetail dascyllus =

Species of fish

Dascyllus aruanus, known commonly as the whitetail dascyllus or humbug damselfish among other vernacular names, is a species of marine fish in the family Pomacentridae.

== Description ==
Whitetail dascyllus is up to 10 centimetres (3.9 in) in length but its common size is 6 centimetres (2.4 in) and is white with three black vertical bars.

It is morphologically identical to D. emamo, differing only in the sounds they make and their geographic distribution. It also appears very similar to the closely related D. abudafur. It may also be mistaken for D. melanurus, which has four black stripes instead of three. They have a small mouth, a flat spine, a black and white body with a large white spot between the eyes.

In the first year of life, the damselfish grows to be about 6 centimeters. However, it is fully grown by the end of its second year and remains at around 10 centimeters for another three to four years until it dies. The colors remain the same throughout their lives and serve multiple purposes. It has been hypothesized that the bold contrast of black and white attract fish of the same species, yet display as a sign of their host coral's toxicity to potential predators.

== Habitat ==
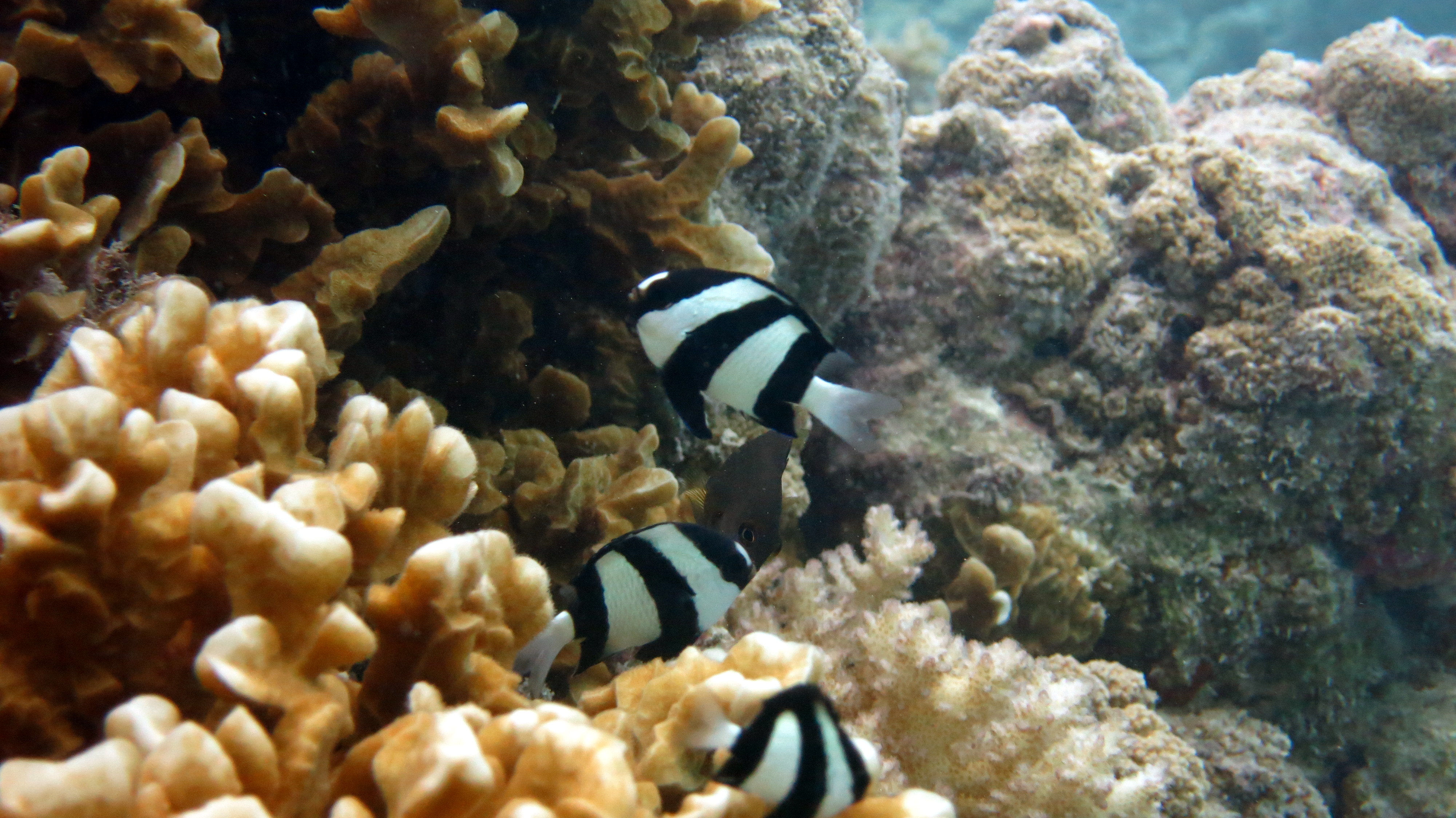
Humbug dascyllus swim near Palmyra Atoll corals

Associated with coral reefs, most usually in groups above Acropora coral heads. The black and white damselfish maintains a symbiotic relationship with its coral reef through exchange of nutrients for shelter. As planktivores, the humbug acts as a "gardener" by grazing on unwanted algae and excreting its waste in the form of phosphate and ammonium. In return, they can use the coral reef for protection and shelter, leaving only when necessary. To remain in the safety of the reef, the humbug will feed on waste and small prey nearby.

== Distribution ==
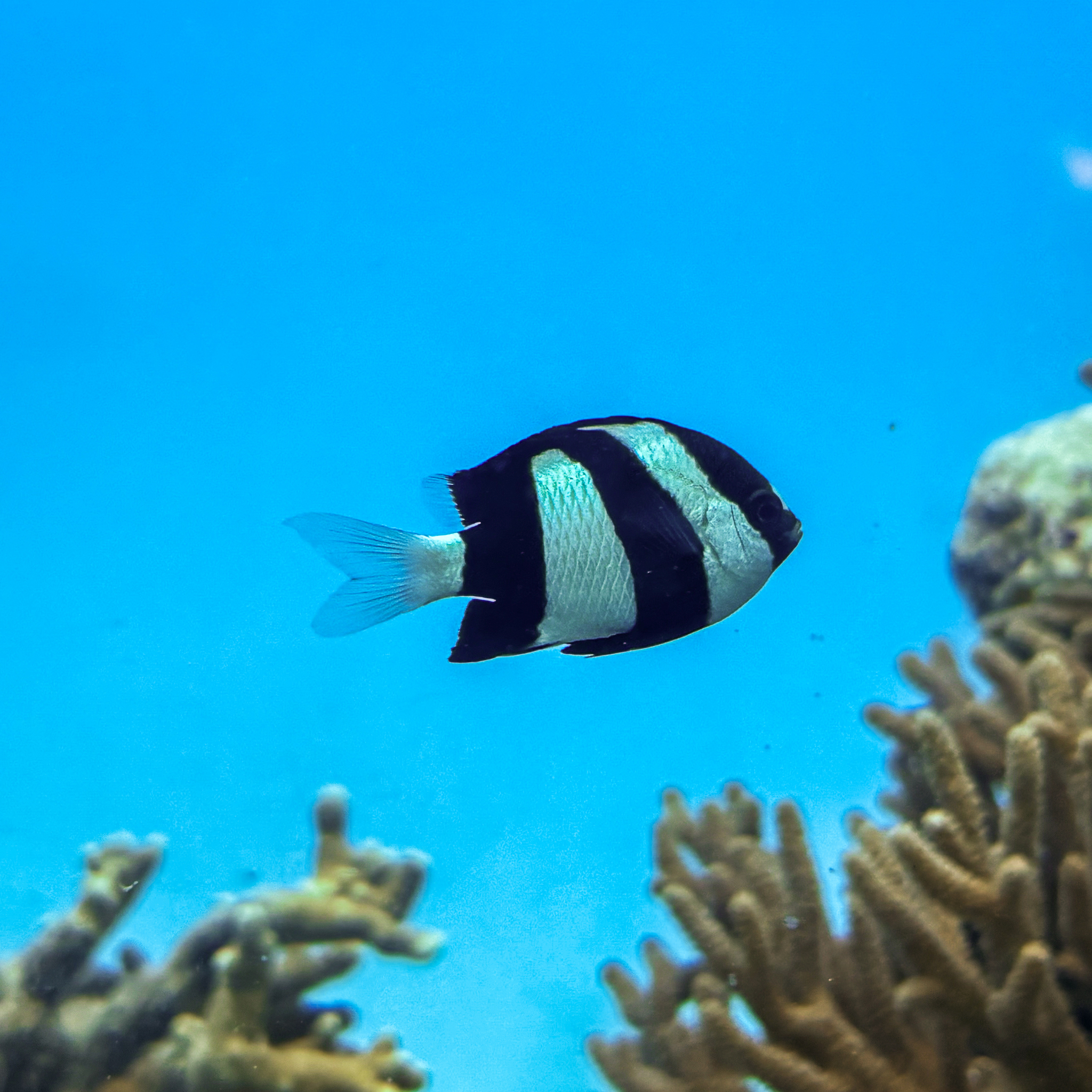
In Guam

Dascyllus aruanus inhabits the Indo-Pacific, east and north of the Sunda Shelf. The population in French Polynesia are now considered their own cryptic species, D. emamo.

They live in small groups of around 30 individuals and prefer smaller territories in the shallow coral reefs. The shallow reefs can range from around one to ten meters deep and the inhabiting damselfish rarely stray far from the home they were born in.

Most of these coral reefs are smaller with less species diversity. The humbug damselfish are particularly territorial and will act accordingly to protect their coral shelters. However, the humbug is found to reside in some of the same coral as Dascyllus marginatus. Instead of seeing this fish as competition, they adapted similar behaviors and are able to cohabitate with each other efficiently.

== Behavior ==
As a group that will stay at the same coral reef for their entire life, Dascyllus aruanus is very aggressive when it comes to their territory. All resources are heavily guarded and any unfamiliar species is seen as a threat. Living in a coral reef in shallow waters can make protection a full time job for some of these fish, making them extremely observant and wary. Some individuals are more aggressive than others, making an attack first response rather than observing for warning signs. As a species residing in shallow waters, there are multiple species of fish that come across the damselfish habitat. The humbug recognizes individuals of its own species by the dominant color pattern of the black stripes rather than movement.

The social behaviors of the damselfish begin at a very young age. Juveniles stay in their schools and heavily rely on each other at all times. Communication in these groups is used for warning signals when threats come across or when food is available around the shelter. Similar to adults, juveniles remain close to their home at all times and will retreat at any sign of danger. Hierarchies are also used in these schools with an early establishment of dominance based on size. Larger fish (males and females) lead the foraging groups and get first priority of food, which usually corresponds to larger size prey. Smaller fish stay in the back of the school and eat smaller and fewer prey than the others.

== Reproduction ==
Unlike other fish, black and white damselfish do not have a spawning season. Mating occurs daily, with females mating with multiple males in a season. A new batch of eggs can be produced every two days with up to two thousand eggs per batch and males court females constantly. Male preference is the only factor affecting the consistency of spawning, with non-random mating selected by females. However, many factors come into play when selecting a male. Courting and mate copying are the two dominant behaviors that correlate to female preference. Mate copying is when a female will mate with a male that just previously mated with another female. Males with higher courtship rates positively correlate with higher reproductive success.

Males use the "signal jump" to attract mates by quickly rising up a water column before swimming down. On the other hand, males that have recently mated are more likely to mate again with a female. Females prefer to spawn at sites that already contain eggs, signifying that a male has higher qualities than others in successful spawning with another female. This copying strategy reduces energy and effort for females to choose a mate while also reducing the chances of selecting a low-quality mate, increasing the reproduction rate and success of a female. Males are highly territorial of their nesting sites and aggressive towards other males when courting a female. They also build and guard the nests once spawning is complete. This constant and efficient reproduction system is likely a large contributing factor to the stable conservation status of Dascyllus aruanus.

== Conservation status ==
As climate change continues to raise ocean temperatures, the humbug's lifestyle dwindles in response. Despite maintaining a status of Least Concern according to the IUCN Red List, the damselfish population remains susceptible to thermal stress and habitat loss by coral bleaching. According to a climate change study conducted in 2020, warmer oceans will result in an increase in mobility and a decrease in aggression by Dascyllus aruanus. The change in behavioral patterns are predicted to shift the social dynamics of a variety of fish that live in cohabitation with the humbug.

While coral reefs are one of the most critical habitats put at risk by climate change, its relationship with Dascyllus aruanus increases its resistance to these effects. When residing in the coral branches, the humbug damselfish will excrete nutrients such as phosphate and ammonium. Coral with these nutrients are able to store more macromolecules which not only increases their energy levels, but also their resistance to thermal stress. The symbiotic relationship between Dascyllus aruanus and its habitat is beneficial and critical to both species as ocean waters continue to rise in temperature.

The current hope of this species rests in their plasticity, as the black and white damselfish have been found to adapt to dead coral colonies. This ability makes them more adaptable to different environments, but the extent of how long they could maintain this change is yet to be determined. The significance of the nutrients provided by living coral has not been quantified, but the humbug damselfish does prefer living coral reefs to dead ones. Not only can they adapt to dead coral, but they can also adapt in their diets. While originally planktivores, black and white damselfish will also eat other small fish and debris in their habitats. Over time, they have developed a broad range of diet and living conditions. These adaptations will help preserve the Dascyllus aruanus, but the effects of climate change could still put them at risk of endangerment or extinction. Overall, the future of the humbug, like many other species, remains uncertain. The current focus of the scientific community is preserving the coral reefs that serve as the habitat for many different species.

== In aquaculture ==
They are called aquarium 'Starter fish' as they are quite tolerant of variable conditions and aid in conditioning the tank environment for less hardy fish. These fish have been reared in captivity. They can be territorial with other fish. The adult is quite aggressive.

== Gallery ==
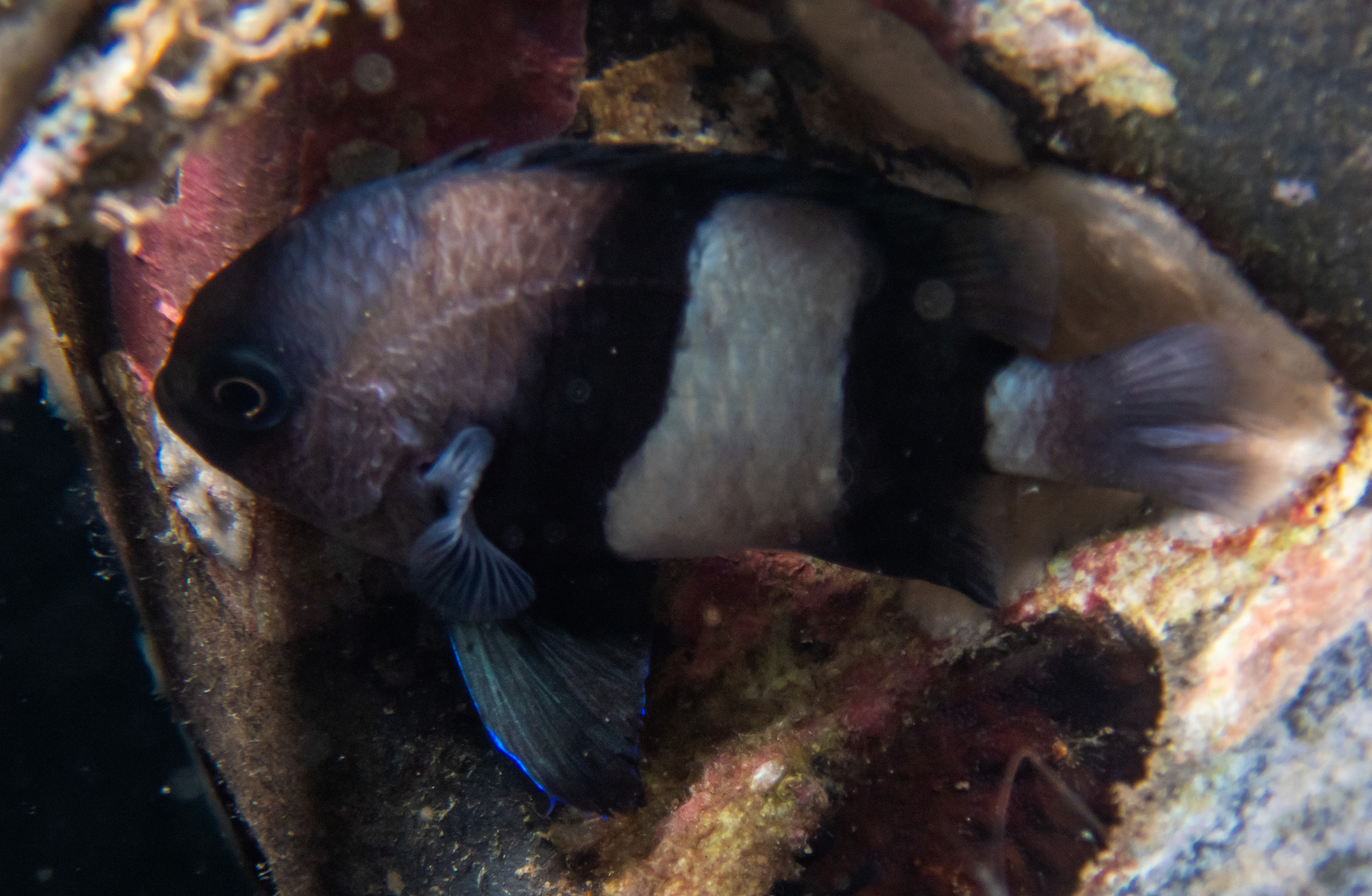

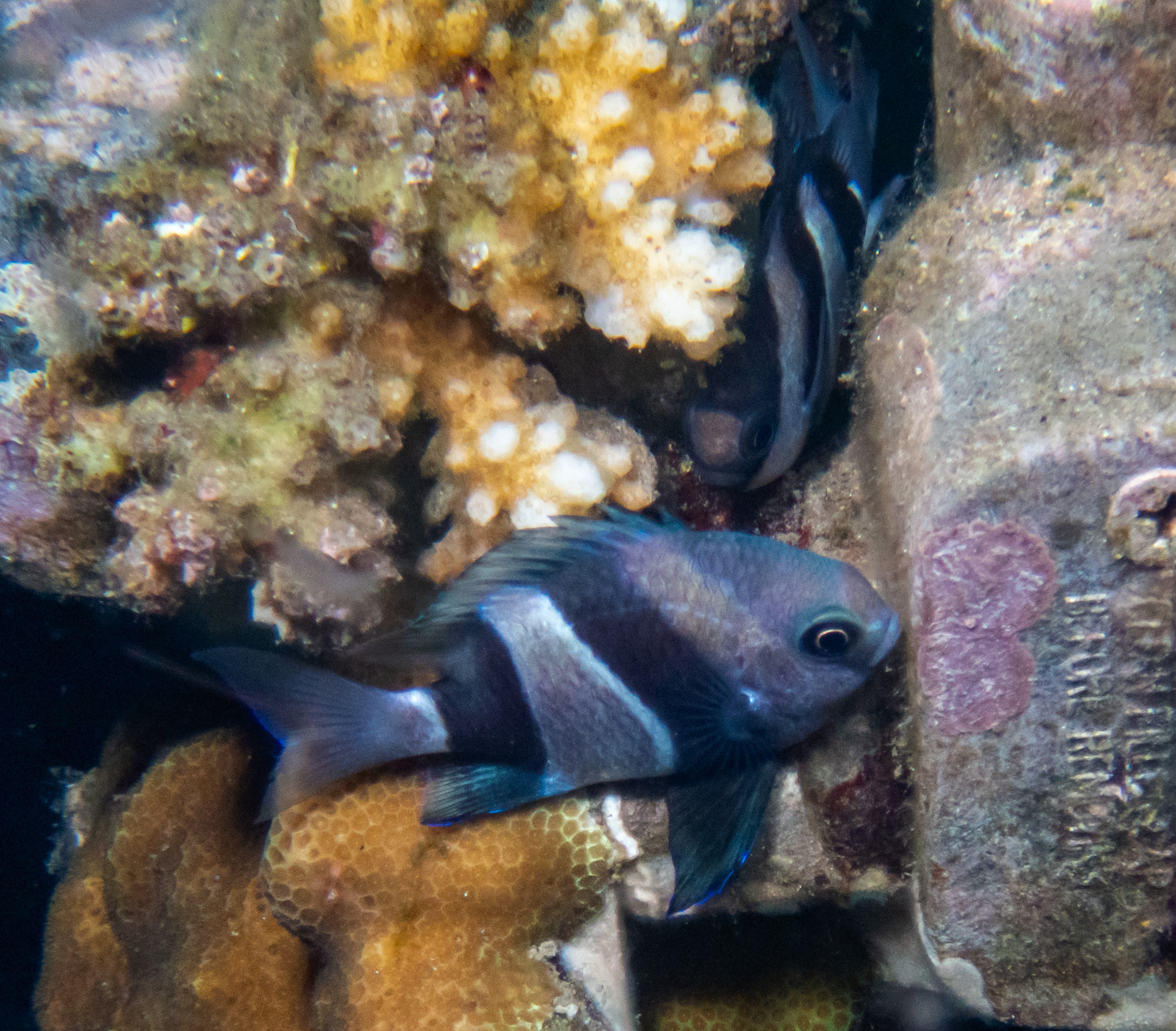

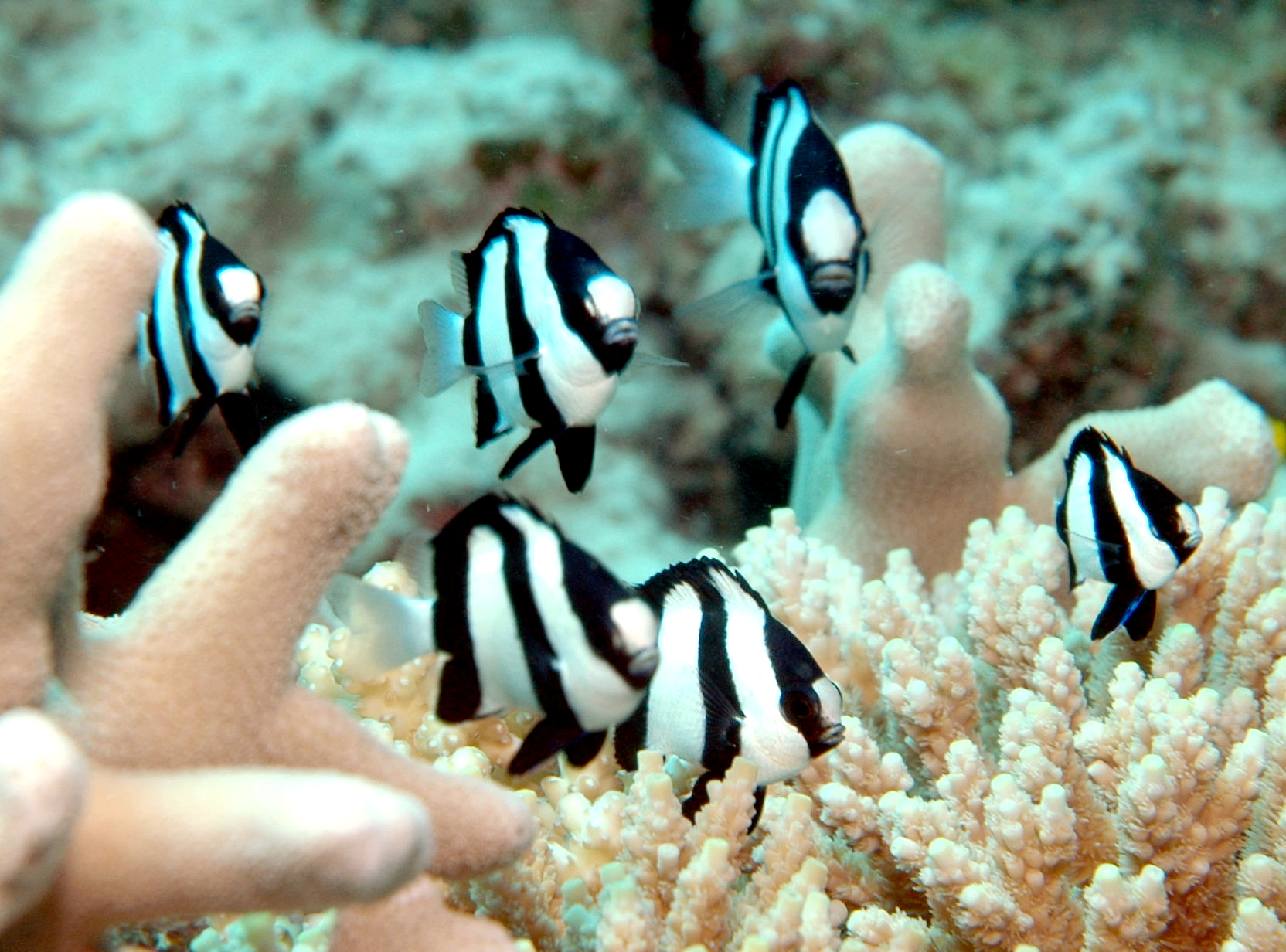

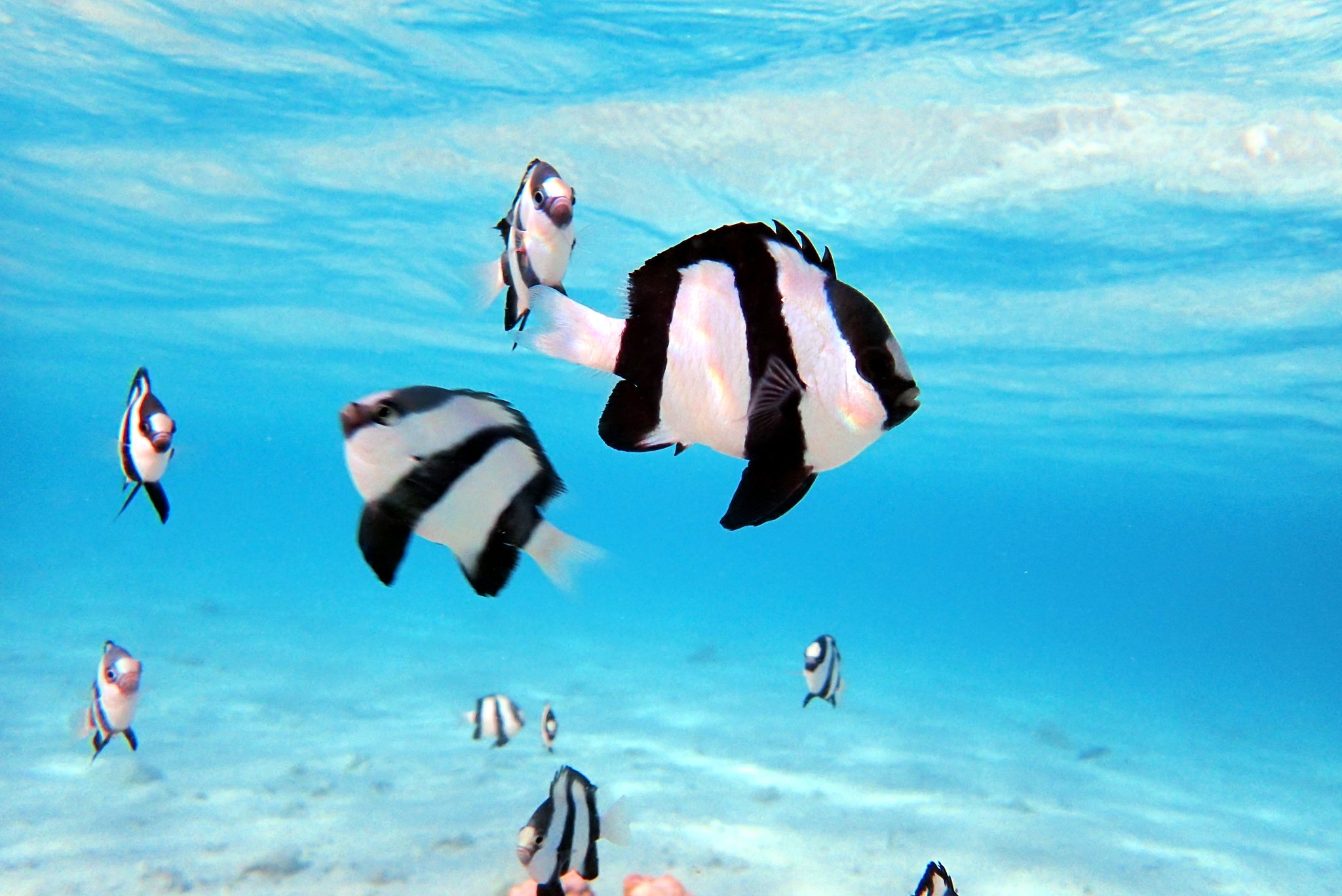

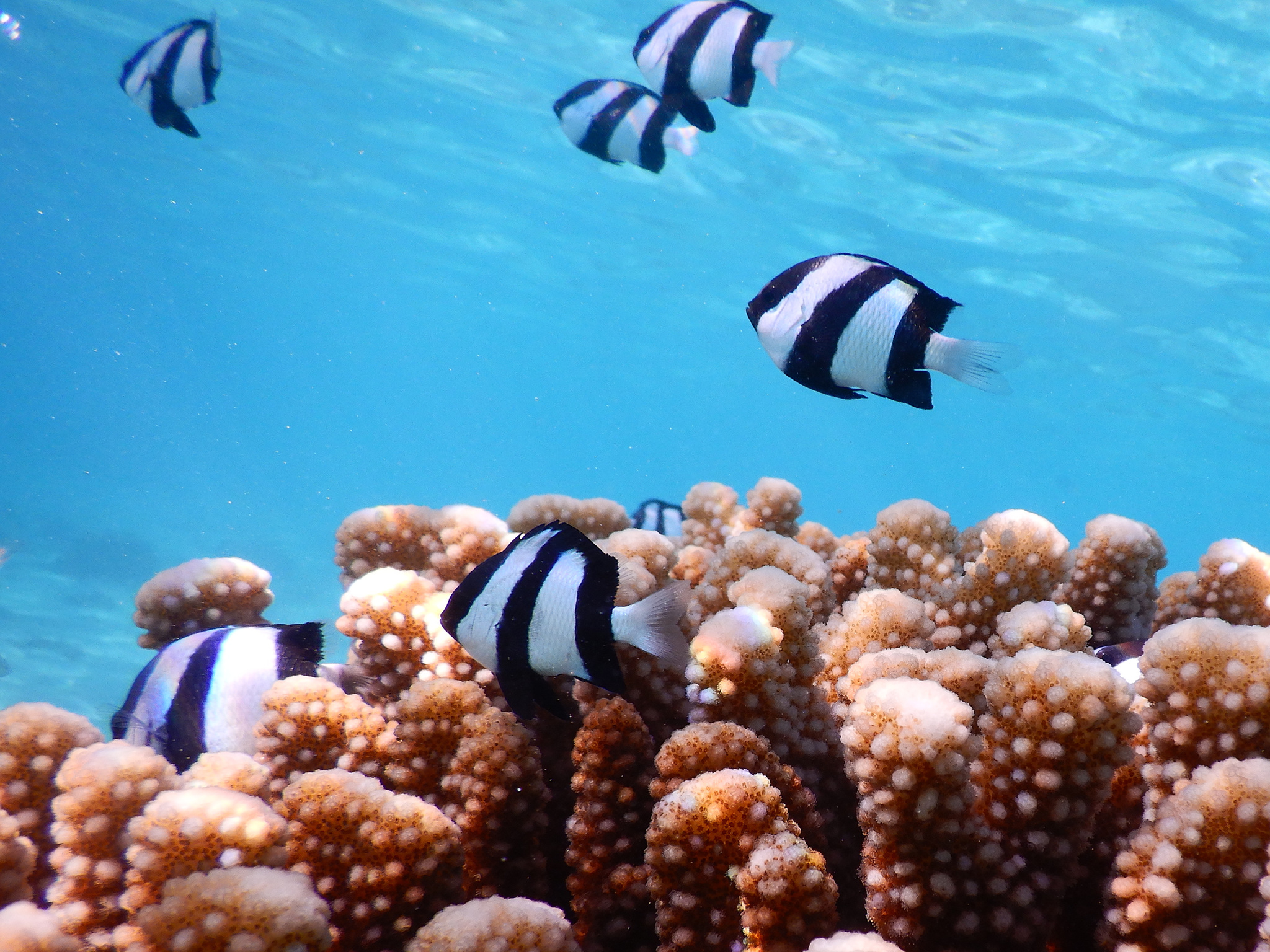
