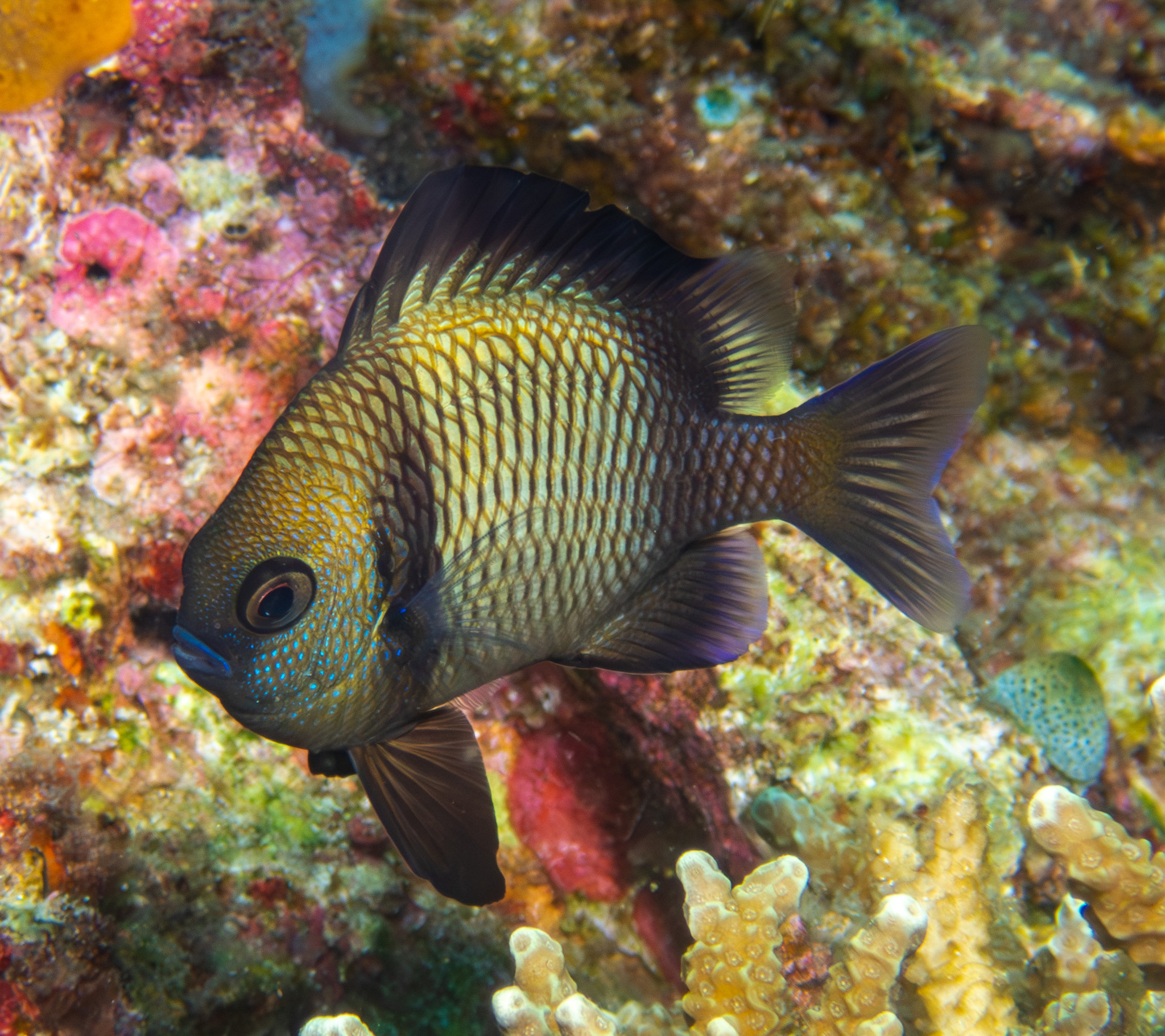
- In Bali, Indonesia

Conservation status
- Least Concern (IUCN 3.1)

Scientific classification
- Kingdom: Animalia
- Phylum: Chordata
- Class: Actinopterygii
- Order: Blenniiformes
- Family: Pomacentridae
- Genus: Dascyllus
- Species: D. reticulatus

Binomial name
- Dascyllus reticulatus (Richardson, 1846)

Synonyms
- Heliases reticulatus Richardson, 1846; Dascyllus xanthosoma Bleeker, 1851; Pomacentrus unifasciatus Kner, 1868

= Dascyllus reticulatus =

Species of fish

Dascyllus reticulatus, known commonly as the reticulate dascyllus or two-stripe damselfish among other vernacular names, is a species of marine fish in the family Pomacentridae.

Reticulate dascyllus is widespread throughout the tropical waters of the central Indo-Pacific region.

In captivity, it is known among aquarium owners for its hardiness, and is thus often recommended to novice saltwater aquarium owners.

== Taxonomy ==
The taxonomy of Dascyllus reticulatus is problematic, because mitochondrial DNA analysis of the species shows that the species is not monophyletic. Although distributed across the Western Pacific, the northern population has been found to clade with D. flavicaudus, while the southern population has been found to clade with D. carneus instead.

== Description ==
Dascyllus reticulatus is a small marine fish that reaches up to 9 centimetres (3.5 in) in length. It is grey, with two vertical stripes and a blue-green tail.

== Behavior ==
Dascyllus reticulatus is an aggressive fish, and will often harass similarly sized fish. It is also territorial with members of its own species, and (in an aquarium context) with new additions to a tank, but does not harm corals or invertebrates.

== Gallery ==
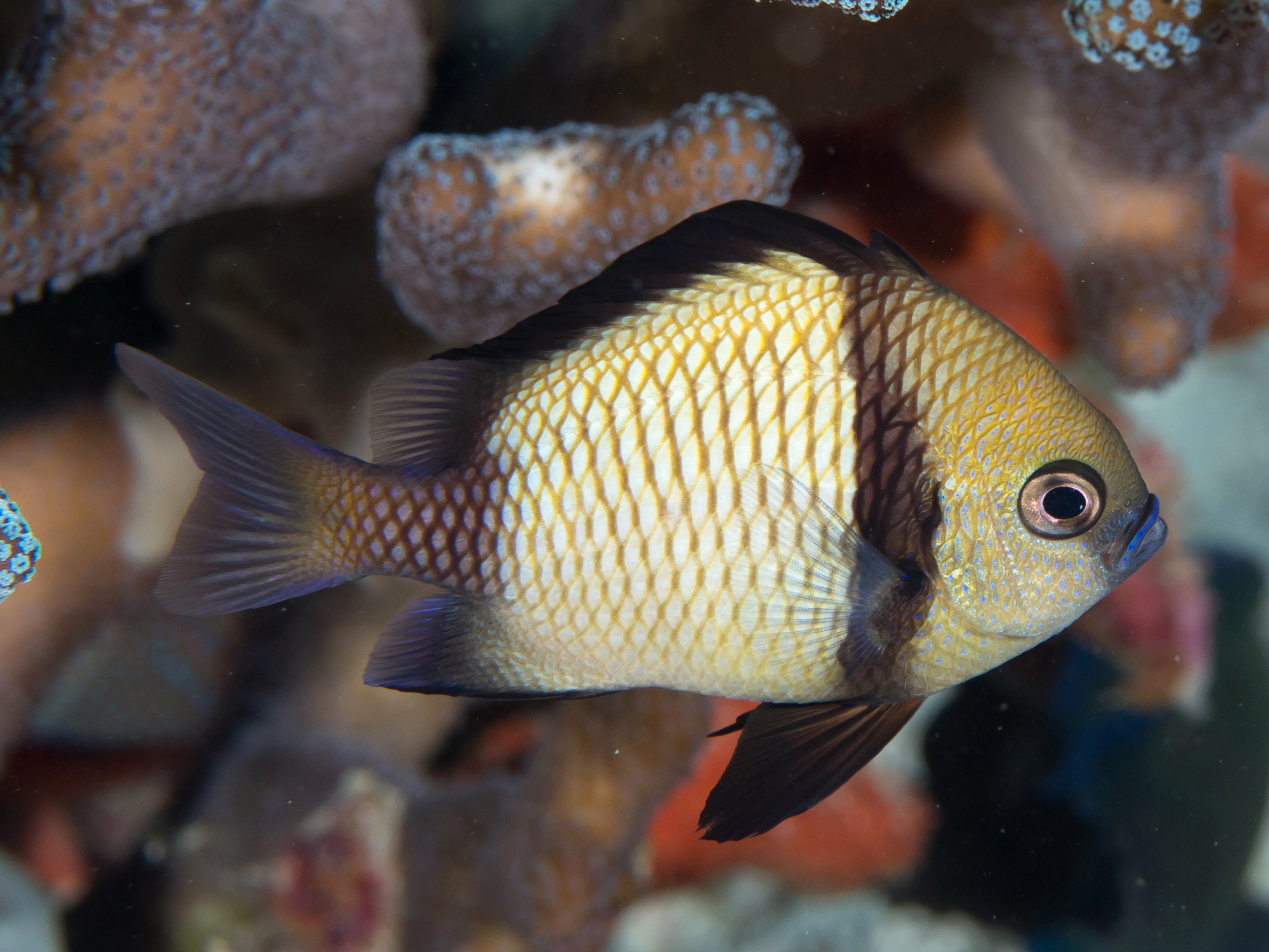
In Raja Ampat, Indonesia

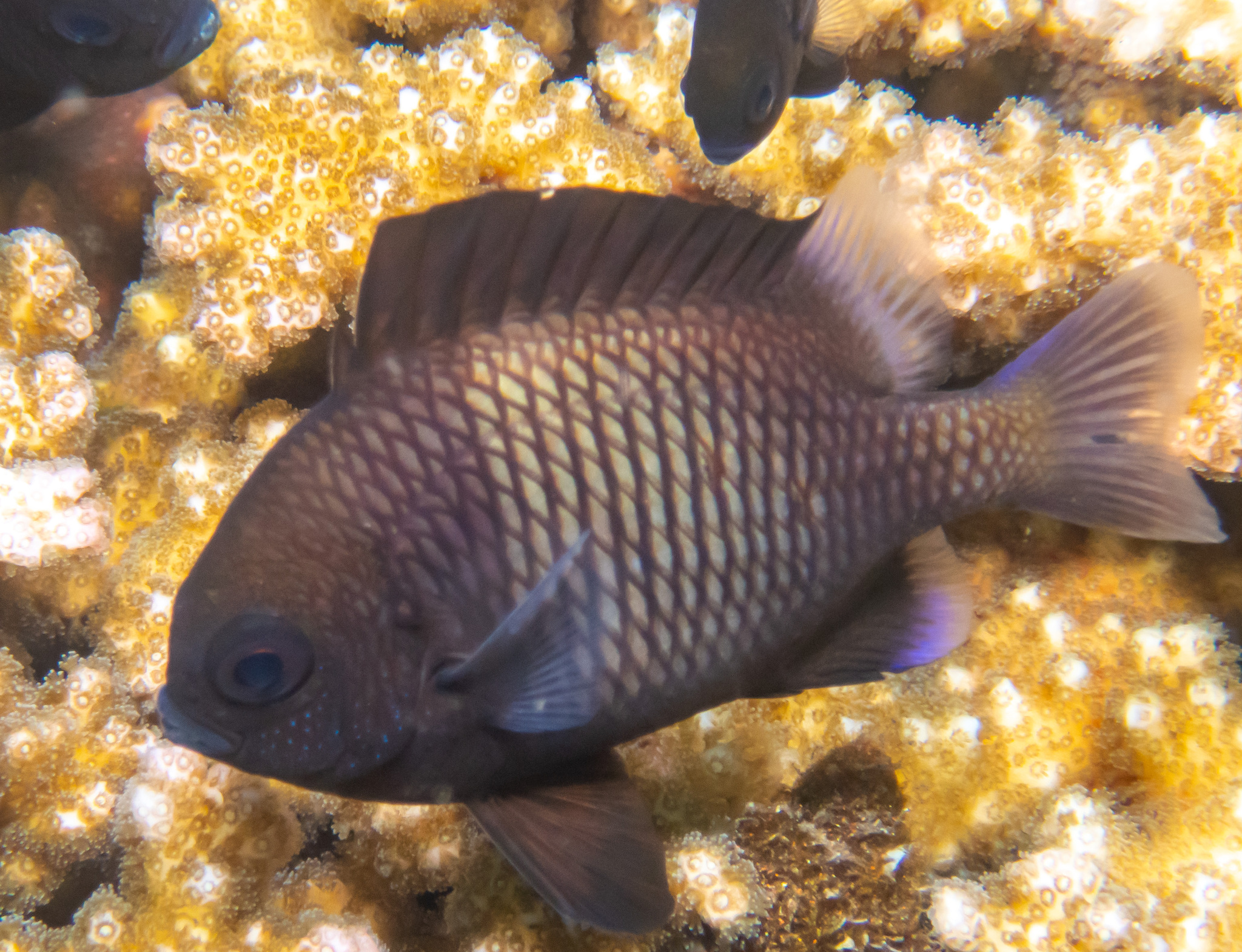
In Bali, Indonesia

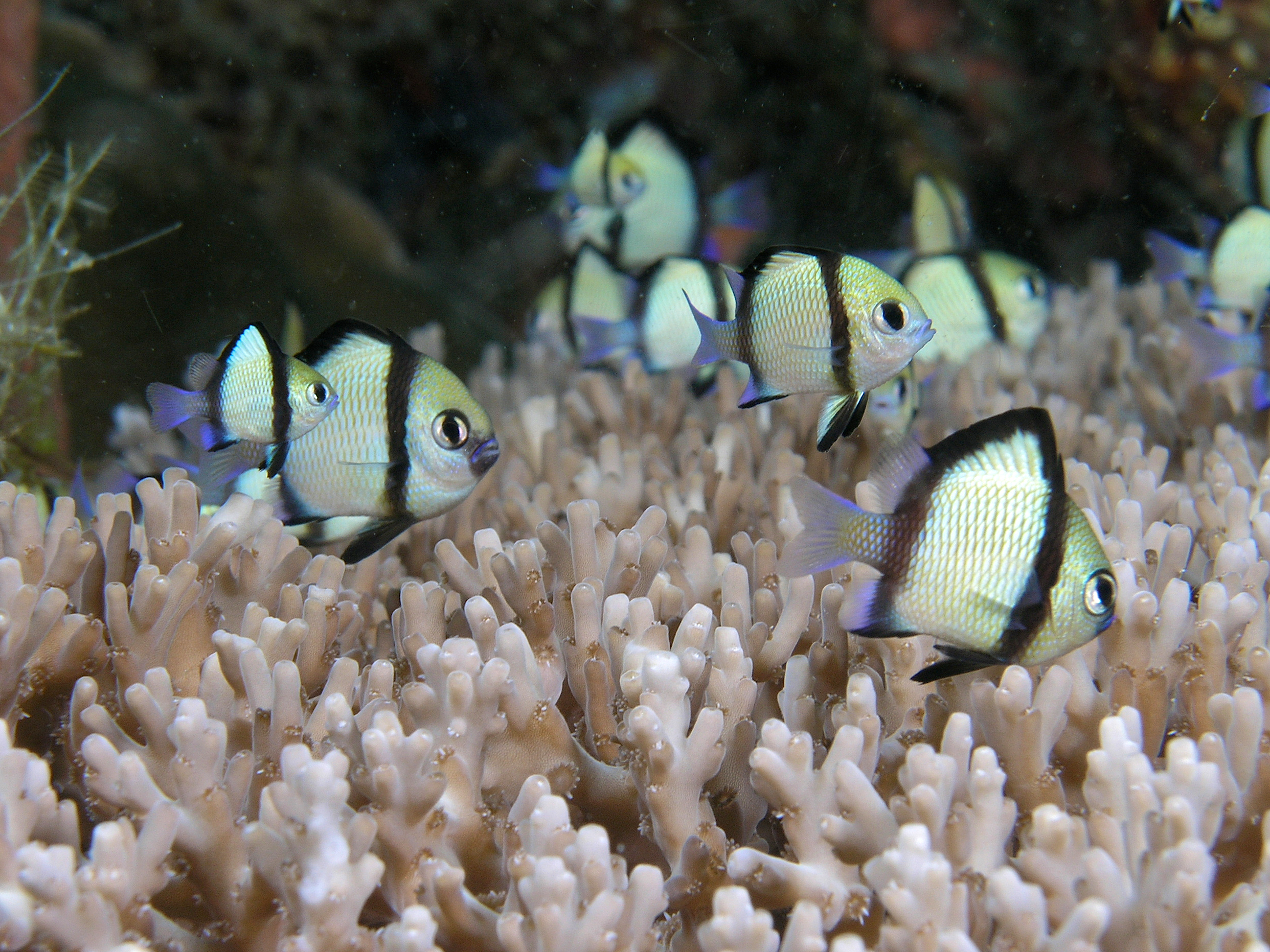
In East Timor

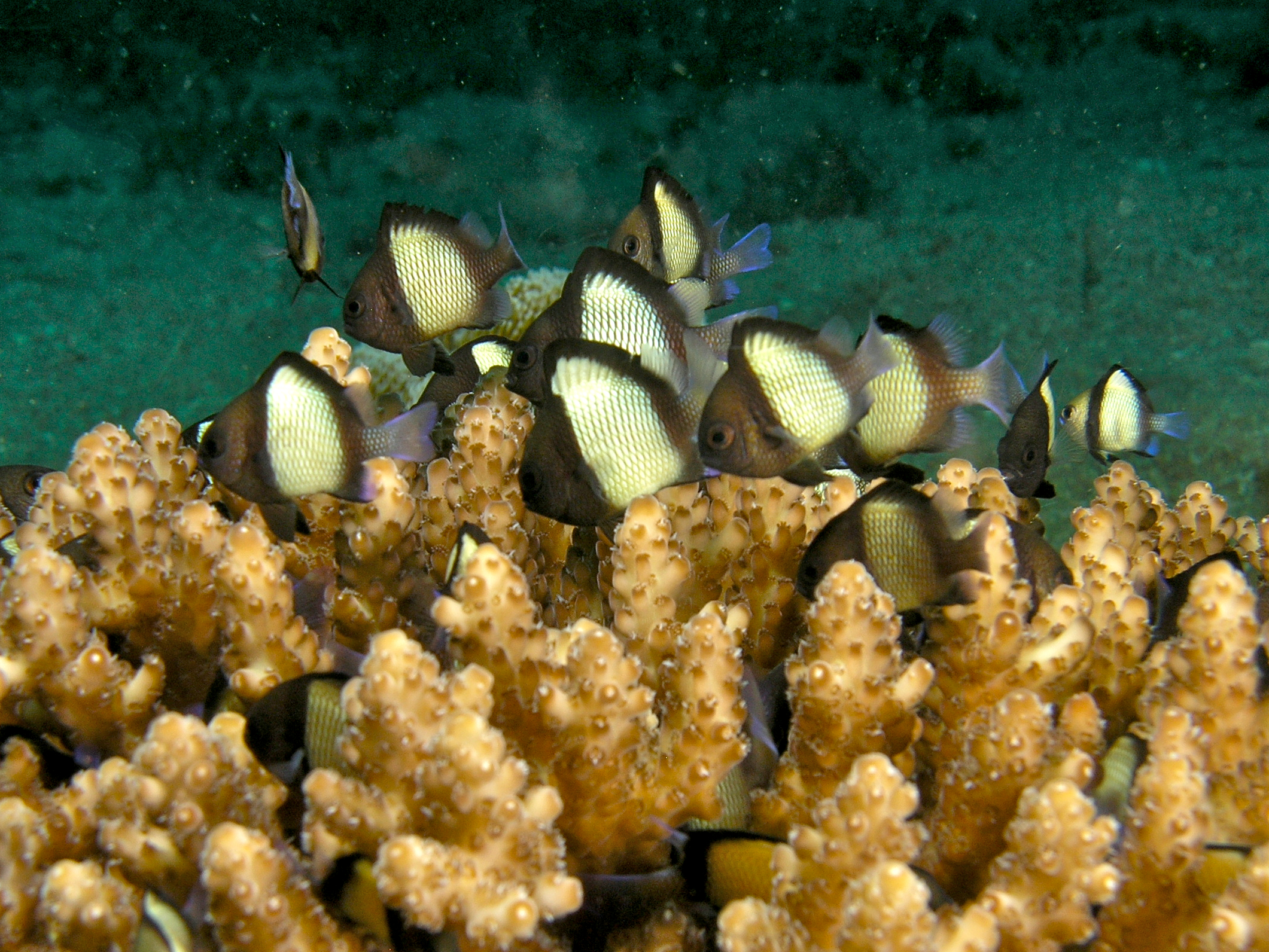
Dwelling on Acropora loripes

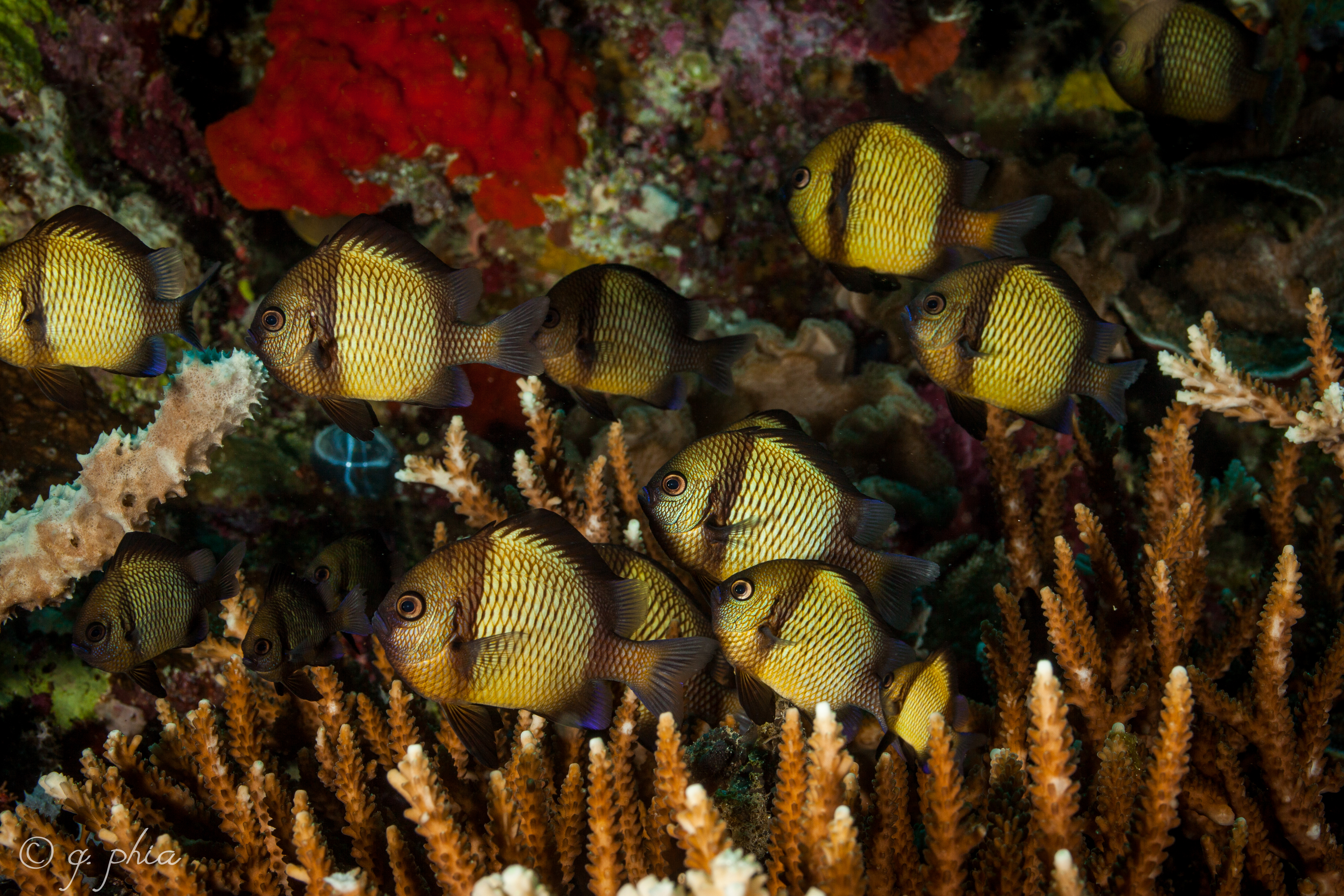
In Wakatobi National Park
