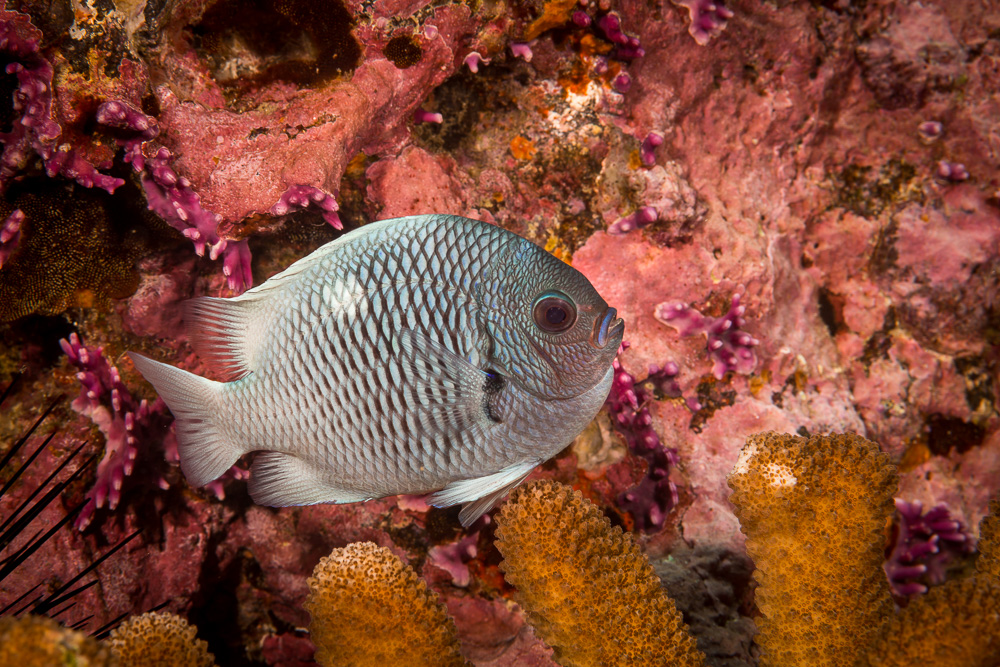

Conservation status
- Least Concern (IUCN 3.1)

Scientific classification
- Kingdom: Animalia
- Phylum: Chordata
- Class: Actinopterygii
- Order: Blenniiformes
- Family: Pomacentridae
- Genus: Dascyllus
- Species: D. strasburgi

Binomial name
- Dascyllus strasburgi Klausewitz, 1960

= Dascyllus strasburgi =

Species of fish

Dascyllus strasburgi, Strasburg's dascyllus, is a species of ray-finned fish from the family Pomacentridae, the clownfishes and damselfishes. It is endemic to the Marquesas Islands where they are found among coral and rocky reefs. and feed on zooplankton. The specific name honours Donald W. Strasburg of the University of Hawaii, a fish ecologist and collector of the type specimen.
