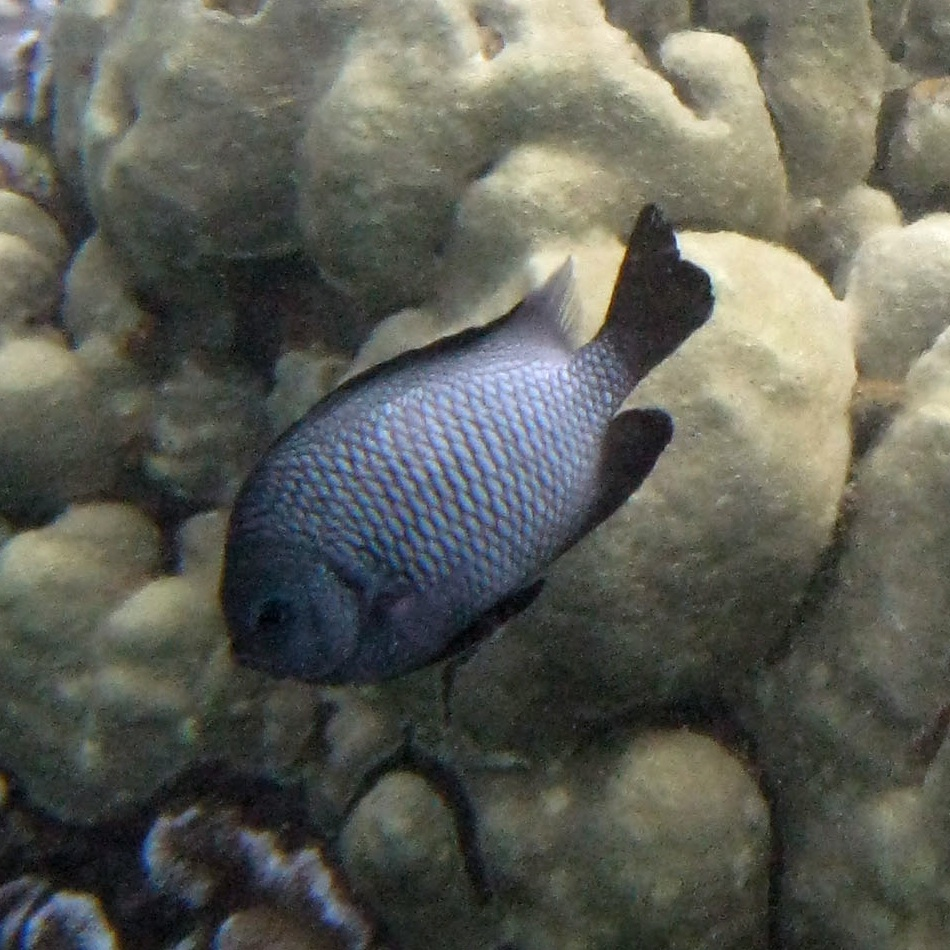

Conservation status
- Least Concern (IUCN 3.1)

Scientific classification
- Kingdom: Animalia
- Phylum: Chordata
- Class: Actinopterygii
- Order: Blenniiformes
- Family: Pomacentridae
- Genus: Dascyllus
- Species: D. albisella

Binomial name
- Dascyllus albisella (Gill, 1862)

Synonyms
- Dascyllus edmondsoni Pietschmann, 1934

= Dascyllus albisella =

Hawaiian dascyllus

Species of fish

Dascyllus albisella commonly known as the Hawaiian dascyllus, Hawaiian domino, Domino damselfish, or white-spotted damsel is a marine fish found in the Eastern Central Pacific.

== Description ==
Length up to 12.5 cm, dark gray to black, but centers of scales on body are whitish.

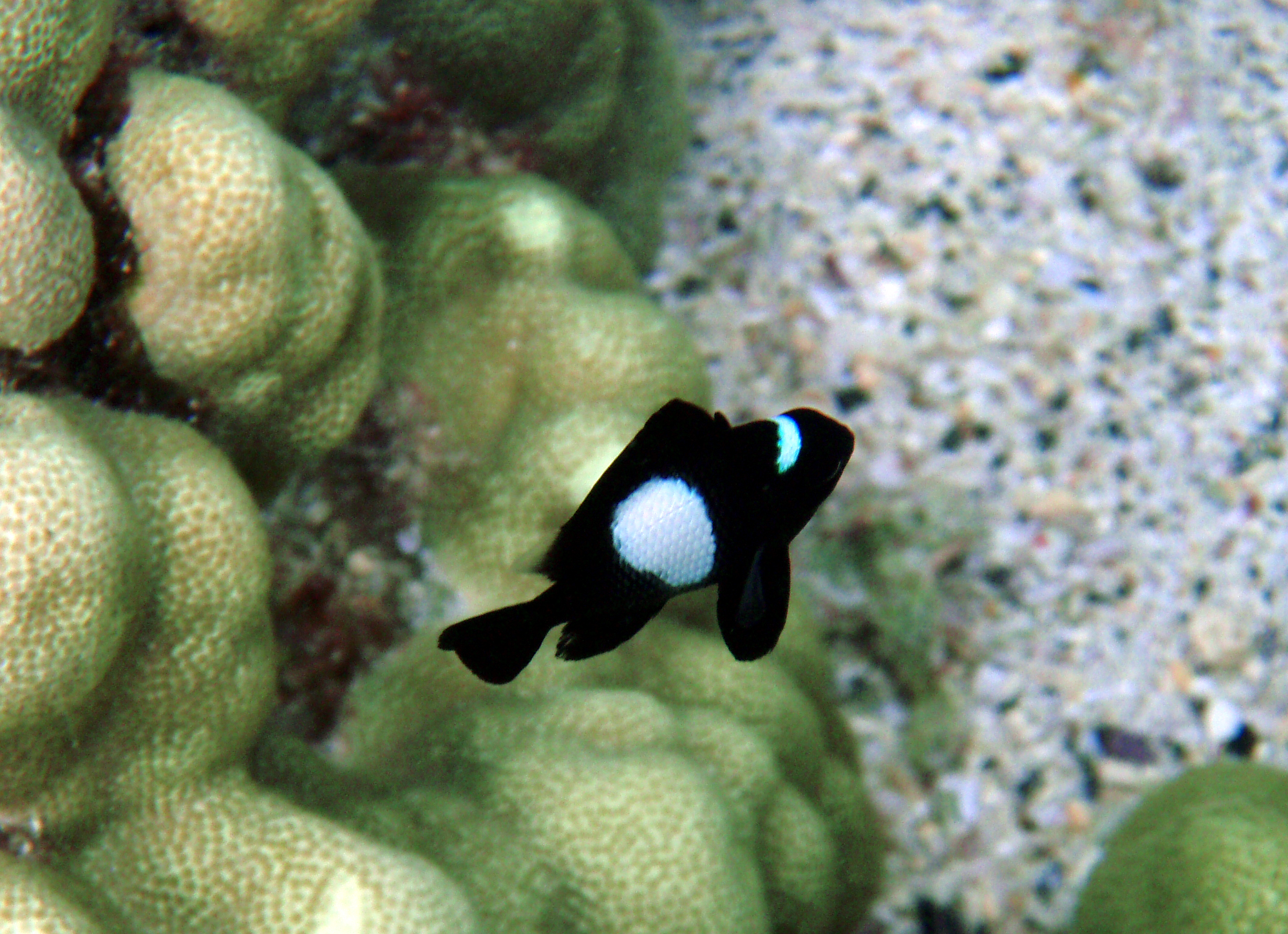
Juvenile

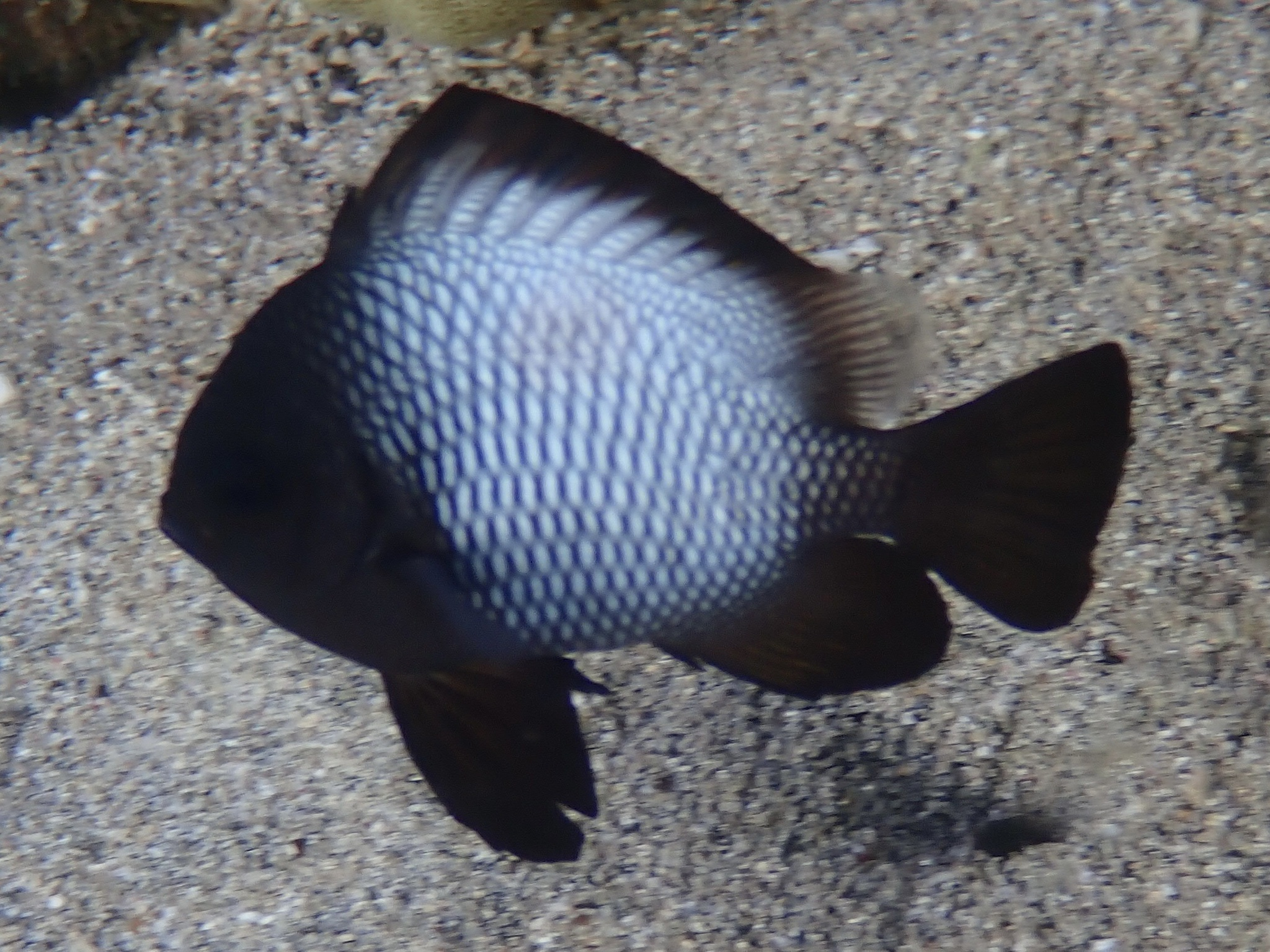
Adult

== Habitat ==
Associated with coral reefs, most usually in shallow, protected waters. swim in shallow water surface to 20 feet below in small openings.

== Distribution ==
The species is found around the Hawaiian Islands and Johnston Island.

== Behavior ==
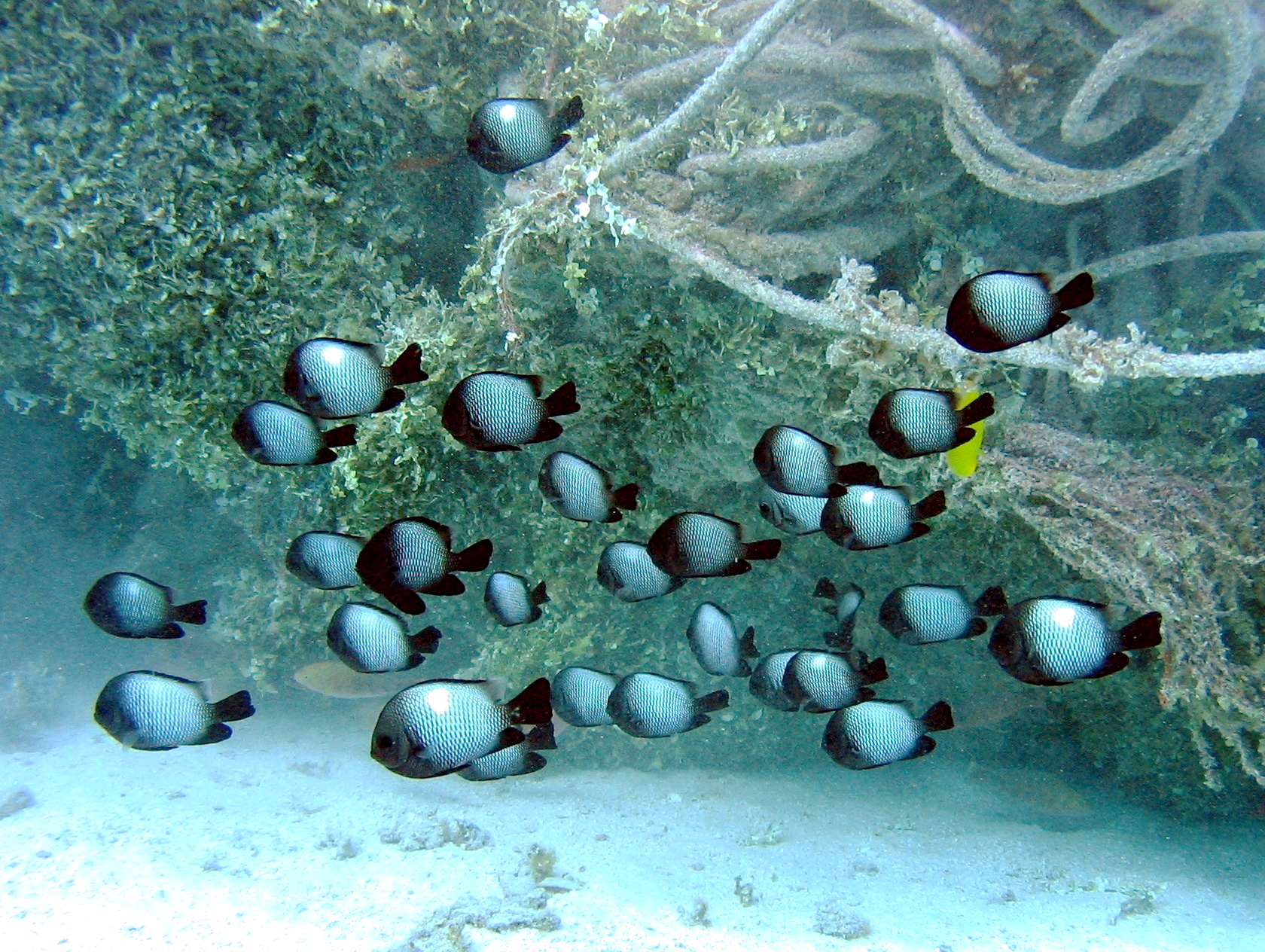
In Hawaii

Dascyllus albisella are a relatively passive species that spends most of their time foraging. Normally, males are the more aggressive of the two genders as they are the ones that usually exhibit parental care.

While male aggressiveness is expected, males exhibit sole care of the offspring unlike most animals. This is due to the uniparental nature of Dascyllus albisella. This does not indicate that the females are not present whatsoever. Nor does this show that the females only have a duty to lay the eggs. In cases where the male is not present, females may develop more aggressiveness depending on the situation.

As we can see, females do not desert the nest after mating. Females that are larger are more likely to defend the nest in the absence of the male than smaller females. That being said, the nest is defended most frequently by females that were born at that nest.

This does not apply to all the females. Some females, even when raised at the nest will not defend the nest regardless. This increased aggressiveness is more favored towards the larger females, however the correlation isn't terribly strong between size and nest defense. There is only a tendency for larger fish to defend. In another case when both parents are present, the female will display increased aggressiveness when predation levels increase. Females have a tendency to only display aggressiveness when said female's eggs are in danger.

Dascyllus albisella displays aggression by making chirping sounds. There is a difference in the chirping that Dascyllus albisella utilizes towards their own versus other organisms. Females tend to produce aggressive sounds when a male is chased by other female fish. Towards their own species, they make a popping sound that is composed of multiple pulses. In addition, they make these aggressive sounds when chasing juveniles. Towards other species, Dascyllus albisella will make a one and two pulse. The fact that they make different aggressive sounds towards other species shows that they are capable of distinguishing themselves from one another

Dascyllus albisella are also known to hold territories. A territory holder will interact aggressively only when other fish attempt to enter its domain. A territory holder will tolerate most of the fish entering its territory. However, a few fish will be chased away immediately. This behavior is possibly due to those chased away were of similar size to the territory holder and threatened its control on its own territory

Dascyllus albisella interact with each other at an early age as well. The younger fish are referred to as juveniles. In these juvenile interactions we see that Dascyllus albisella form a size based linear dominance. As one can expect, the aggressive scuffles are between larger fish and smaller fish. This behavior most likely establishes the hierarchy early on. This is further reinforced by the observation that growth is less in lower status fish or in larger groups. For larger groups this is most likely that the fish in the group are keeping each other smaller due to the hierarchy, as a result, they retard their growth.

We see that these fish will settle in a group during settling season and said fish will stay in their group even if they chance upon a better group, which shows that Dascyllus albisella aren't that aggressive in their choice of group.
