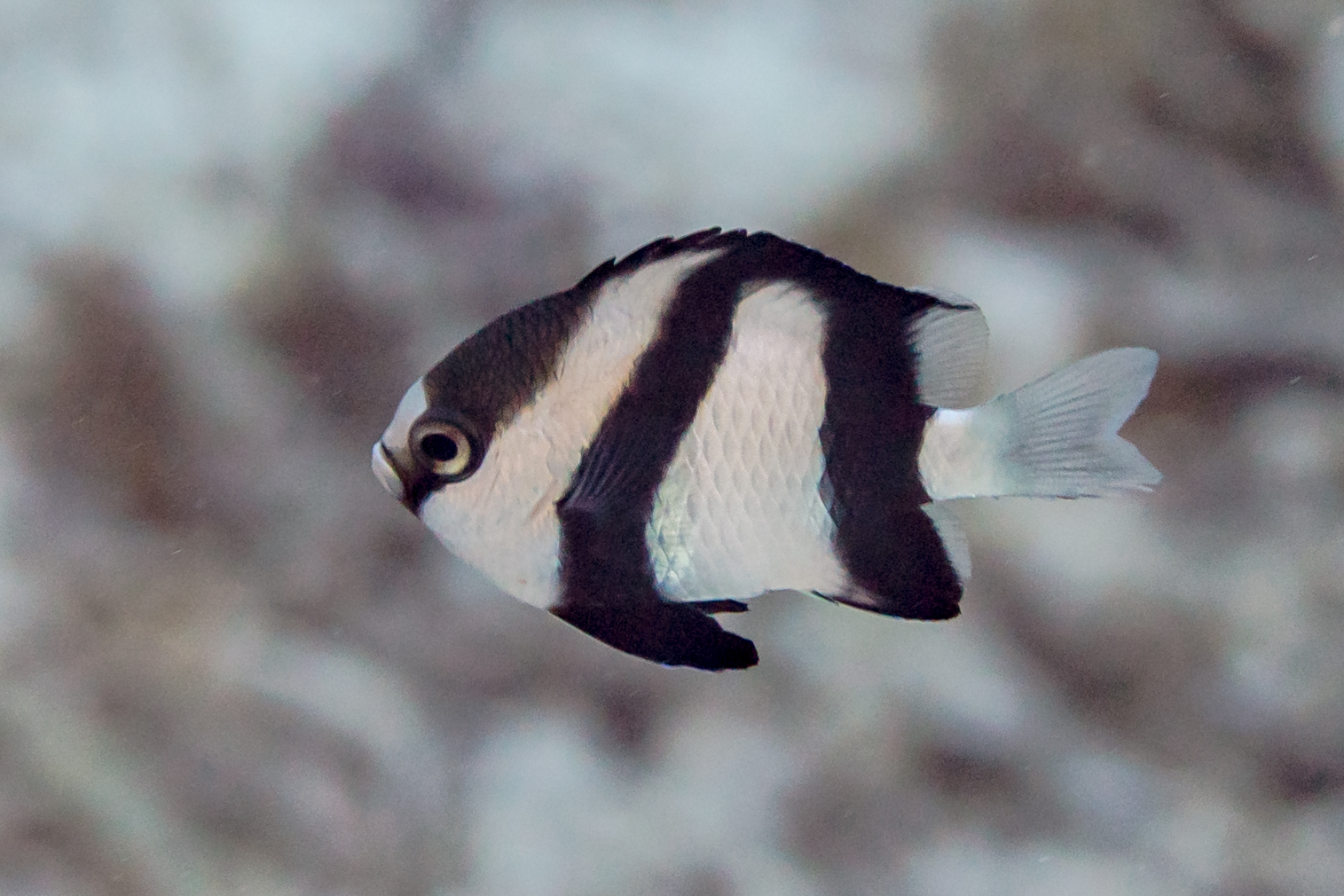
- In the Red Sea

Scientific classification
- Kingdom: Animalia
- Phylum: Chordata
- Class: Actinopterygii
- Order: Blenniiformes
- Family: Pomacentridae
- Genus: Dascyllus
- Species: D. abudafur

Binomial name
- Dascyllus abudafur Forsskål, 1775

= Dascyllus abudafur =

Species of ray-finned fish

Dascyllus abudafur, the Indian Ocean humbug, is a species of ray-finned fish from the family Pomacentridae, the clownfishes and damselfishes.

== Distribution ==
It is found in the Red Sea, along the coasts of eastern Africa to South Africa, the Seychelles, Comoros, Madagascar and Mascarene Islands east to the Sunda Islands.

== Taxonomy ==
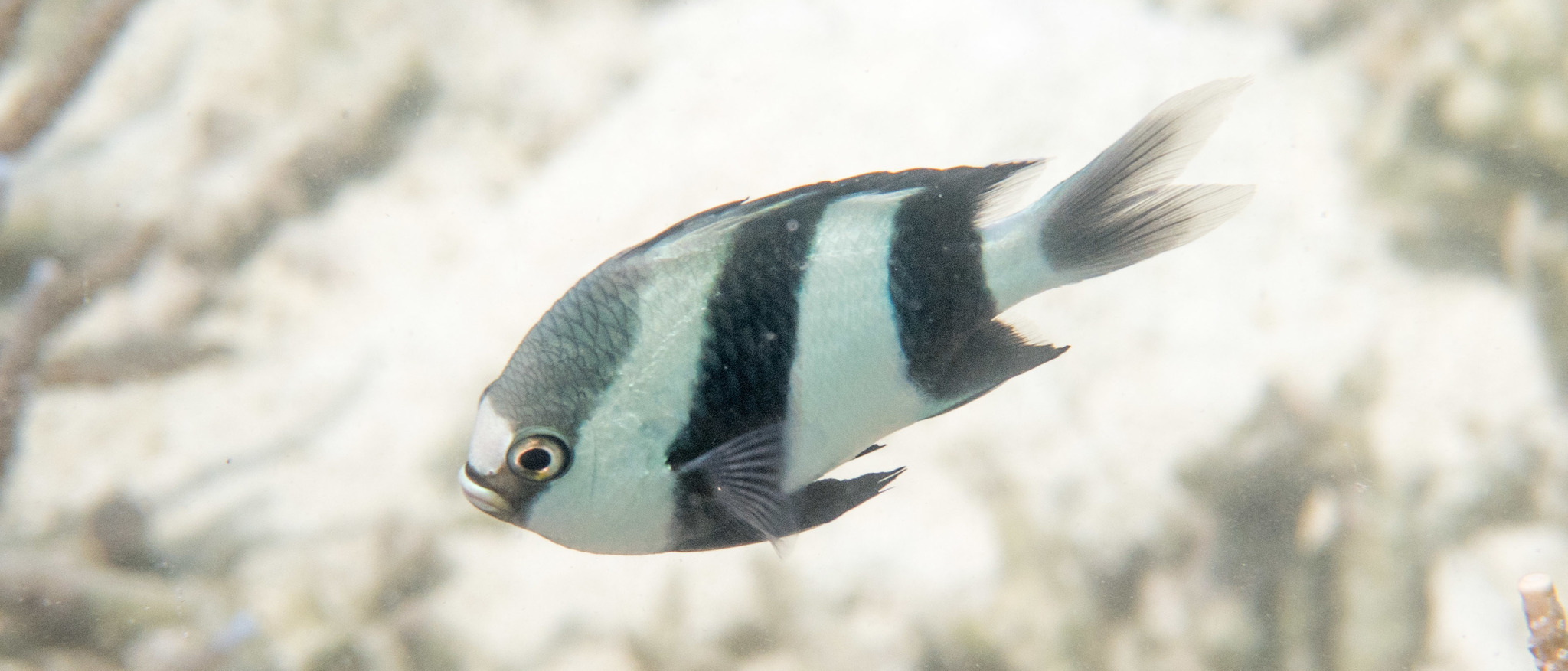
Unlike D. aruanus, D. abudafur may exhibit a dark coloured tail fin, although not all individuals do so. In the Maldives.

It has previously been classified as synonymous with the Pacific humbug (Dascyllus aruanus) but mitochondrial and nuclear DNA analysis shows that the two species were are genetically and morphologically different, with different geographic ranges.

Due to its close relation with D. aruanus, it is part of the D. aruanus species complex (D. aruanus, D. abudafur, D. melanurus).

=== Etymology ===
The specific name is derived from the Arabic word for this species Abu-dafur Jabûd.

== Gallery ==
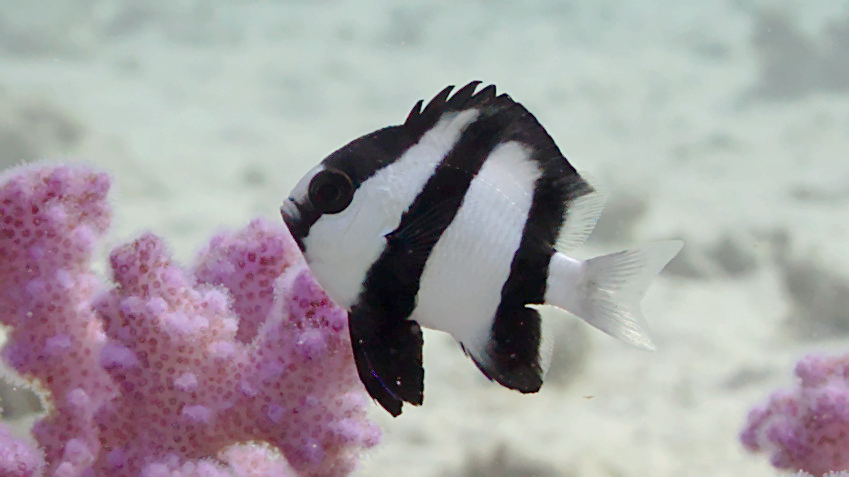
In the Red Sea

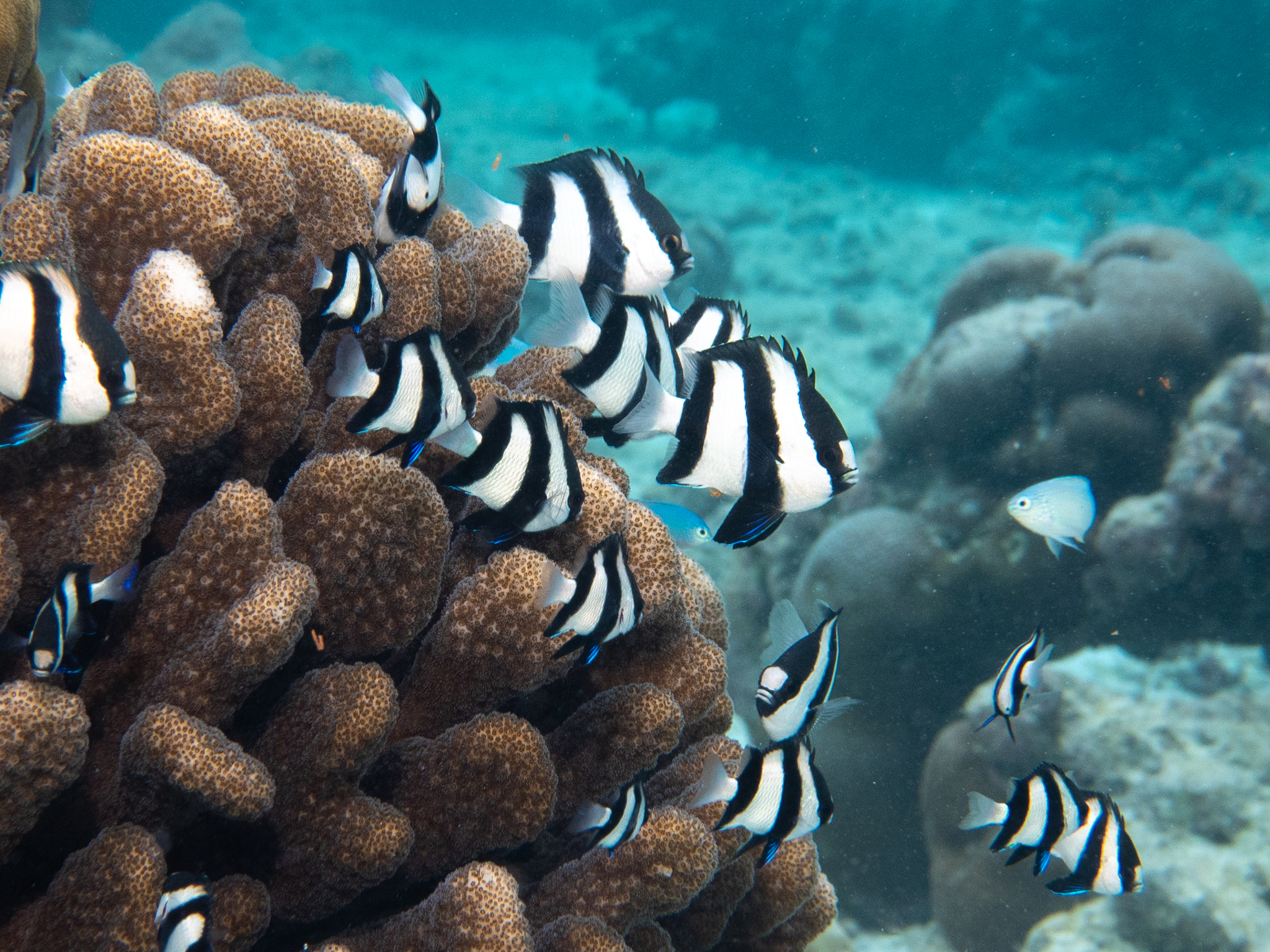
In the Maldives

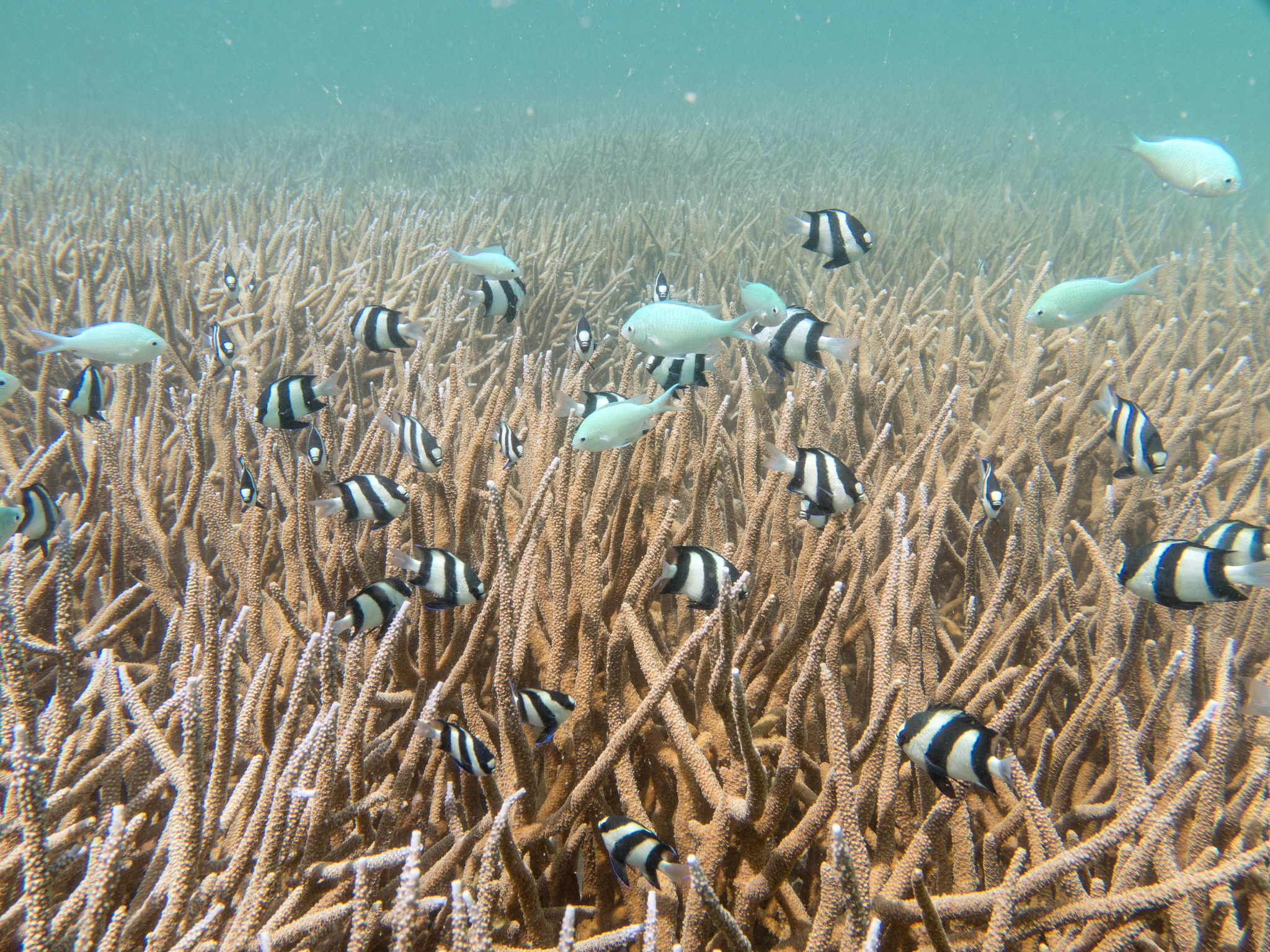
With blue-green chromis, in the Maldives
