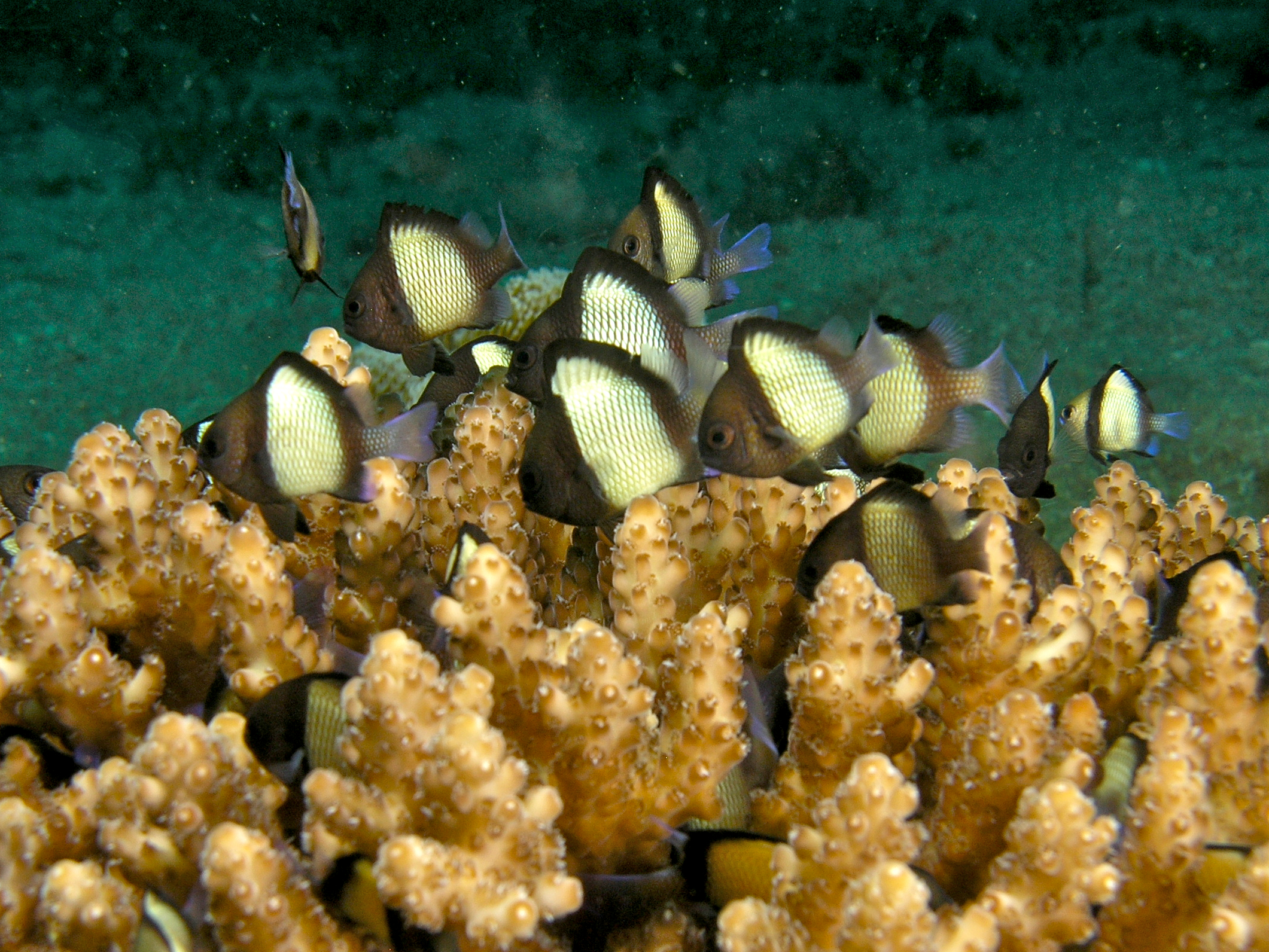
- Two stripe damselfish swimming among the branches of Acropora loripes

Conservation status
- Endangered (IUCN 3.1)

Scientific classification
- Kingdom: Animalia
- Phylum: Cnidaria
- Subphylum: Anthozoa
- Class: Hexacorallia
- Order: Scleractinia
- Family: Acroporidae
- Genus: Acropora
- Species: A. loripes

Binomial name
- Acropora loripes (Brook, 1892)

Synonyms
- Acropora murrayensis (Vaughan, 1918); Acropora rosaria (Dana, 1846); Madrepora loripes Brook, 1892; Madrepora murrayensis Vaughan, 1918; Madrepora rosaria Dana, 1846

= Acropora loripes =

Species of coral

Acropora loripes is a species of branching colonial stony coral. It is common on reefs, upper reef slopes and reef flats in the tropical Indo-Pacific. Its type locality is the Great Barrier Reef.

== Description ==
Acropora loripes is a branching colonial coral with a variety of growth forms, forming heads or plate-like layers and sometimes having stalks and resembling bottlebrushes. The branchlets are 5 to 12 mm (0.2 to 0.5 in) wide and up to 45 millimetres (1.8 in) in length. They sometimes have naked tips but below these, the axial corallites are about 3 millimetres (0.12 in) in diameter and the large radial corallites are tubular and crowded together so that they often touch each other.

== Distribution and habitat ==
Acropora loripes is native to the tropical Indo-Pacific. Its range extends from the Red Sea to Thailand, Malaysia, Indonesia, Papua New Guinea and Australia. It occurs subtidally at depths between 5 and 25 metres (16 and 82 ft) in various habitats including upper reef slopes and reef flats.

== Biology ==
The skeleton of Acropora loripes is secreted by the polyps and is covered by a thin layer of tissue. When feeding, the polyps protrude from the corallites. Each has twelve tentacles, one of which is longer than the others. The interior of the polyps opens into a body cavity which interconnects with other polyps through a system of channels called the coenenchyme. This is a zooxanthellate species of coral and has symbiotic dinoflagellates living within its tissues. These are photosynthetic and provide much of the energy used by the coral. In combination with pigments in the tissue, they are responsible for the yellowish-brown colour of the colony.

Acropora loripes is a hermaphrodite and the different colonies in an area synchronise their breeding activity. In the Great Barrier Reef, mature individuals liberate eggs and sperm into the sea five or six days after the full moon in November and December. Fertilisation is external and the larvae form part of the plankton until settling on the seabed. Here they undergo metamorphosis and new colonies are founded.

== Conservation ==
Acropora loripes is threatened more by damage to the reefs where it lives rather than specific threats to this coral. Like other members of its genus it is susceptible to bleaching and several coral diseases, and is particularly favoured as part of its diet by the crown-of-thorns starfish which feeds on the external tissue and polyps. The IUCN Red List of Threatened Species lists it as being an endangered species.
