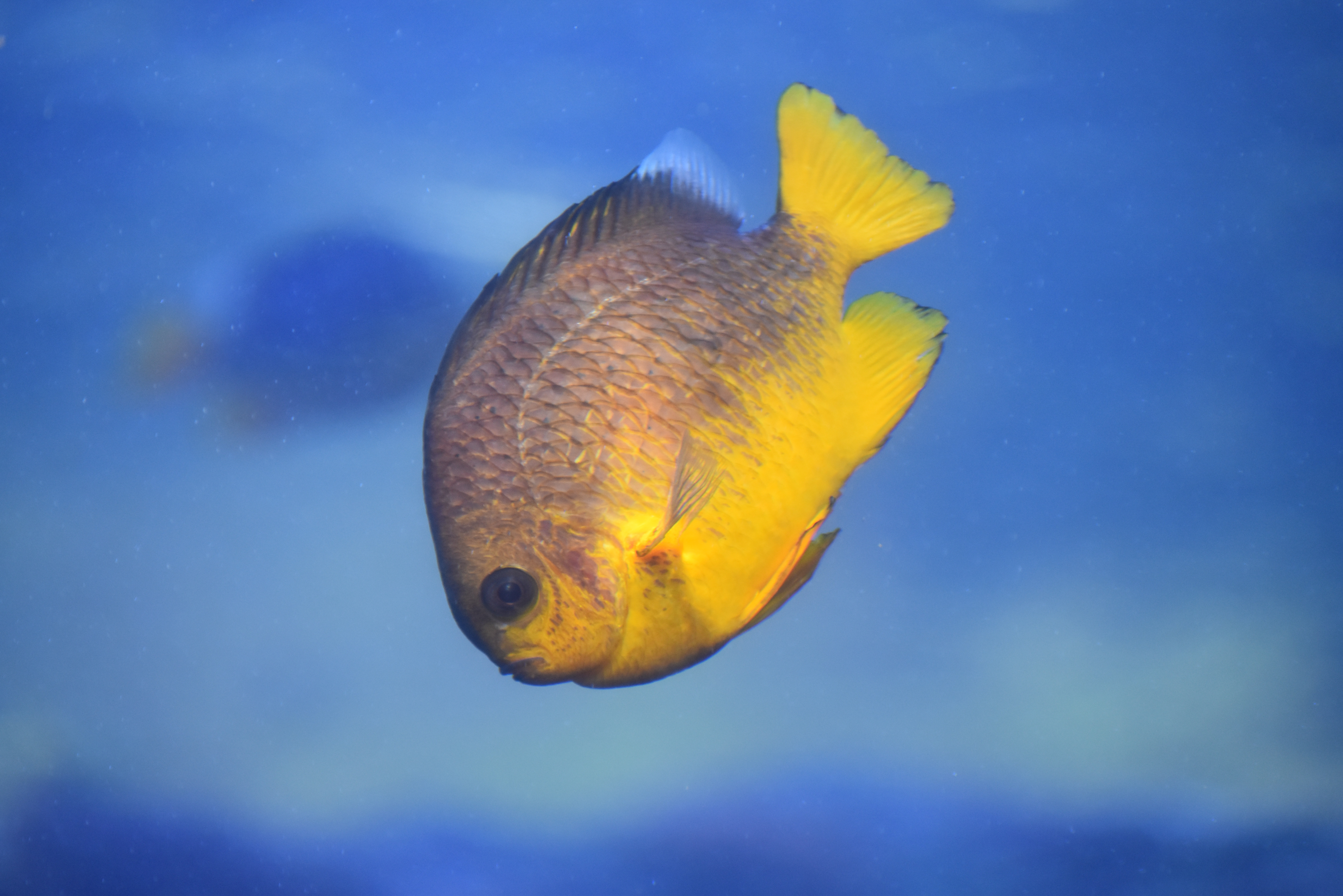

Conservation status
- Least Concern (IUCN 3.1)

Scientific classification
- Kingdom: Animalia
- Phylum: Chordata
- Class: Actinopterygii
- Order: Blenniiformes
- Family: Pomacentridae
- Genus: Dascyllus
- Species: D. auripinnis

Binomial name
- Dascyllus auripinnis J. E. Randall & H. A. Randall, 2001

= Dascyllus auripinnis =

Species of fish

Dascyllus auripinnis is a damselfish from the Eastern Central Pacific. It occasionally makes its way into the aquarium trade. It grows to a size of 11.5 cm in length.
