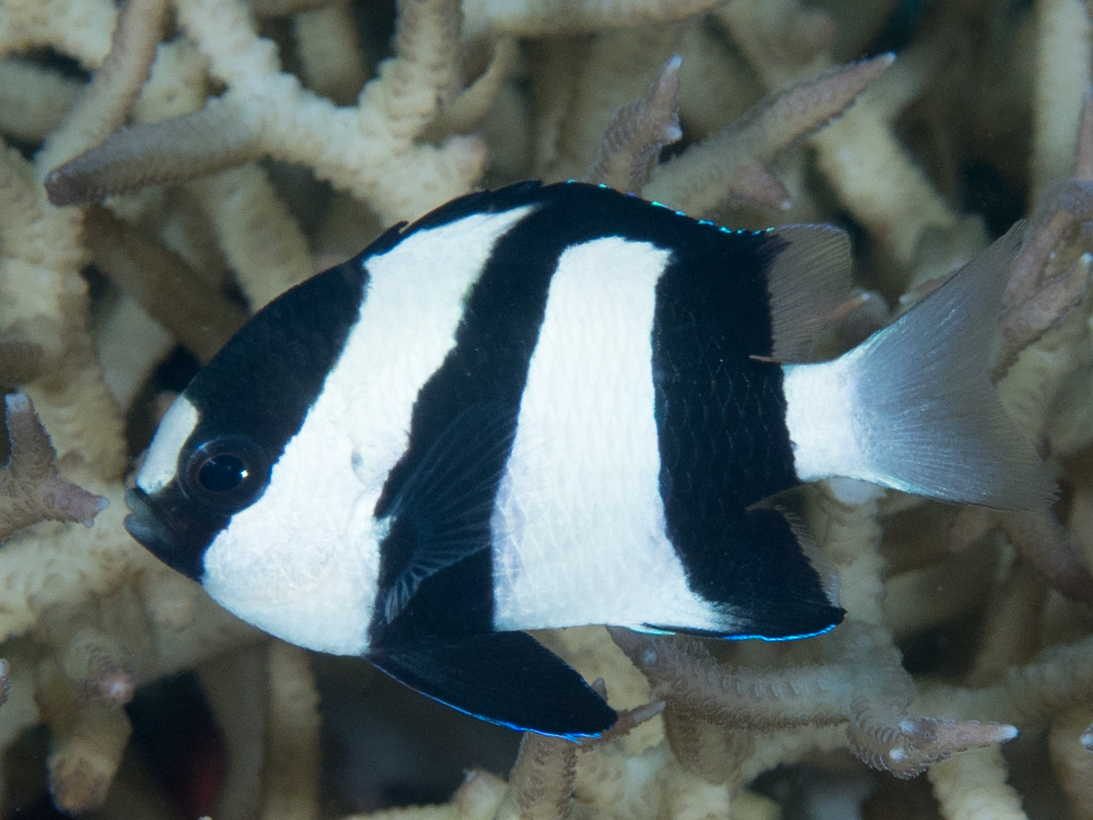
- Dascyllus aruanus

Scientific classification
- Kingdom: Animalia
- Phylum: Chordata
- Class: Actinopterygii
- Division: Teleostei
- Order: Blenniiformes
- Family: Pomacentridae
- Subfamily: Chrominae
- Genus: Dascyllus; G. Cuvier, 1829

Type species
- Chaetodon aruanus Linnaeus, 1758

Synonyms
- Pirene Gistel, 1848; Tetradrachmum Cantor, 1850; Pellochromis Fowler and Bean, 1928; Semadascyllus Fowler, 1941

= Dascyllus =

Genus of fishes

Dascyllus is a genus of fish in the family Pomacentridae. They are usually commensals with corals.

== Taxonomy ==
Three species complexes have been proposed: the D. aruanus complex (D. aruanus, D. abudafur, D. melanurus), the D. trimaculatus complex (D. trimaculatus, D. albisella, D. auripinnis, D. strasburgi), and the D. reticulatus complex (D. reticulatus, D. carneus, D. marginatus, D. flavicaudus). However, only the D. aruanus complex and the D. trimaculatus complex are monophyletic. The species of the D. aruanus complex are the most basal in the genus Dascyllus.

== Biology ==
Species of the genus Dascyllus are found in the Indo-West Pacific, and are primarily planktivorous.

The species of the D. trimaculatus complex are the largest in size, growing up to 90–110 mm (SL). All other species are smaller, reaching 50–65 mm (SL), with the exception of D. flavicaudus, which reaches 90 mm (SL).

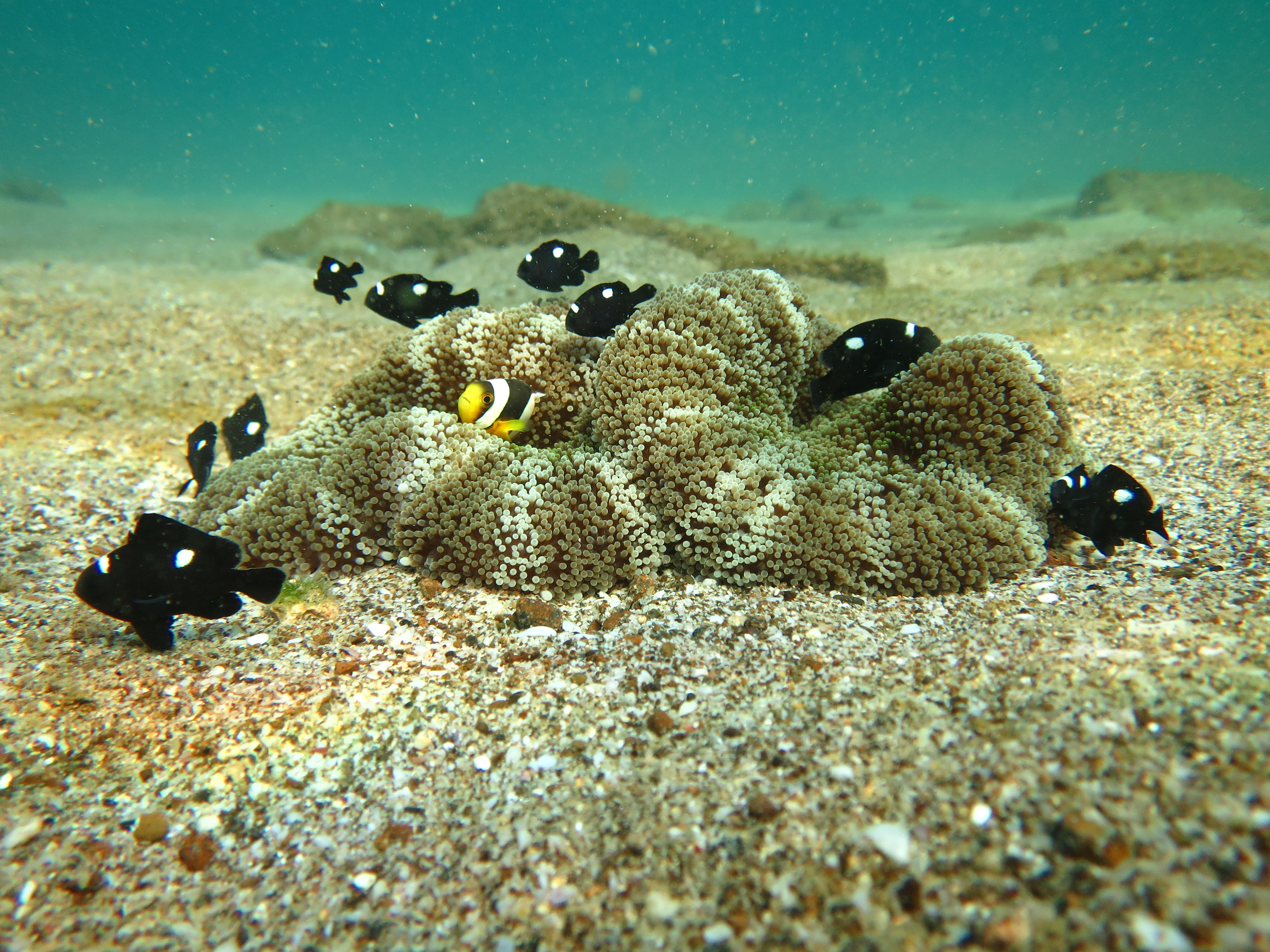
Juvenile D. trimaculata hosting Stichodactyla haddoni.

The D. trimaculatus complex is strongly associated with sea anemones as juveniles. Some and potentially all species in the D. trimaculatus group are gonochoristic, but all other species are protogynous (ie, females can change sex and become males as they grow older or larger). It is likely that protogyny arose once in the common ancestor of the genus Dascyllus, which was then lost in the ancestor of the D. trimaculatus complex. All Dascyllus species are demersal spawners, and in all species, the female lays her eggs in nests prepared by a male, and the eggs are tended by the male until hatching.

== Species ==
Currently, 11 recognized species are placed in this genus:

Species	Common name	Image
Dascyllus abudafur (Forsskål, 1775)	Indian Ocean humbug	
Dascyllus albisella T. N. Gill, 1862	Hawaiian dascyllus	
Dascyllus aruanus (Linnaeus, 1758)	Pacific Ocean humbug, whitetail dascyllus	
Dascyllus auripinnis J. E. Randall & H. A. Randall, 2001	Golden domino dascyllus	
Dascyllus carneus J. G. Fischer, 1885	Cloudy dascyllus	
Dascyllus emamo (Lesson, 1831)	Polynesian humbug	
Dascyllus flavicaudus H. A. Randall & G. R. Allen, 1977	Yellowtail dascyllus	
Dascyllus marginatus (Rüppell, 1829)	Marginate dascyllus	
Dascyllus melanurus Bleeker, 1854	Blacktail humbug	
Dascyllus reticulatus (J. Richardon, 1846)	Reticulate dascyllus	
Dascyllus strasburgi Klausewitz, 1960	Strasburg's dascyllus	
Dascyllus trimaculatus (Rüppell, 1829)	Threespot dascyllus	

== Trivia ==
Deb, a character in the animated film Finding Nemo, is a damselfish of genus Dascyllus.
