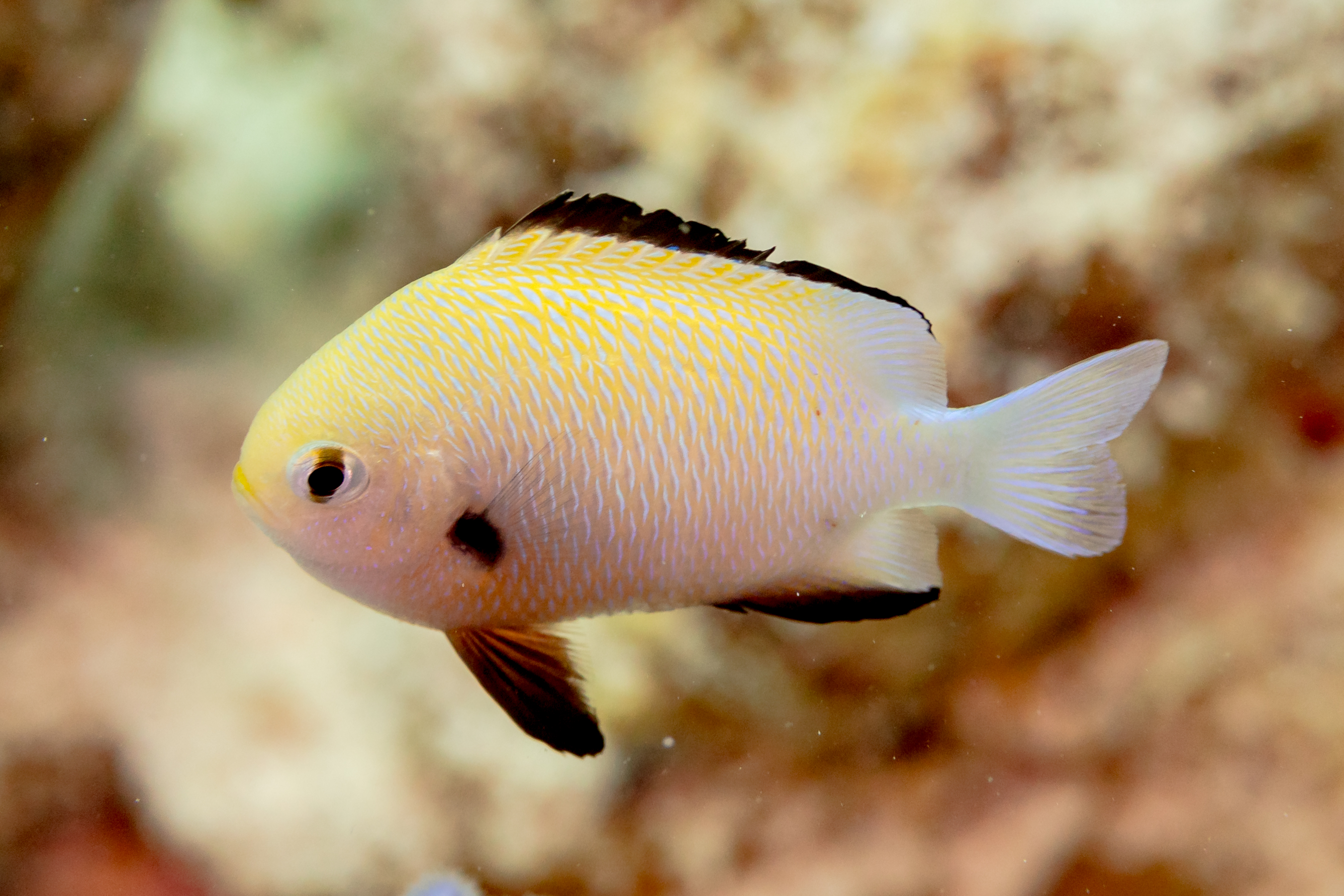

Conservation status
- Least Concern (IUCN 3.1)

Scientific classification
- Kingdom: Animalia
- Phylum: Chordata
- Class: Actinopterygii
- Order: Blenniiformes
- Family: Pomacentridae
- Genus: Dascyllus
- Species: D. marginatus

Binomial name
- Dascyllus marginatus (Rüppell, 1829)

= Dascyllus marginatus =

Species of fish

Dascyllus marginatus, the marginate dascyllus or Red Sea dascyllus, is a damselfish endemic to the Western Indian Ocean. It is a site attached fish that lives in corals, usually Stylophora pistillata and species of Acropora. In these corals it hides at a moment of danger and sleeps at night. It feeds on zooplankton that drifts with the current, and grows to a size of 6 cm in length. Dascyllus marginatus lives in groups of 2-25 individuals, and while foraging for food around their home coral, group members keep separated and stable foraging spaces.

== Human Uses ==
It occasionally makes its way into the aquarium trade.
