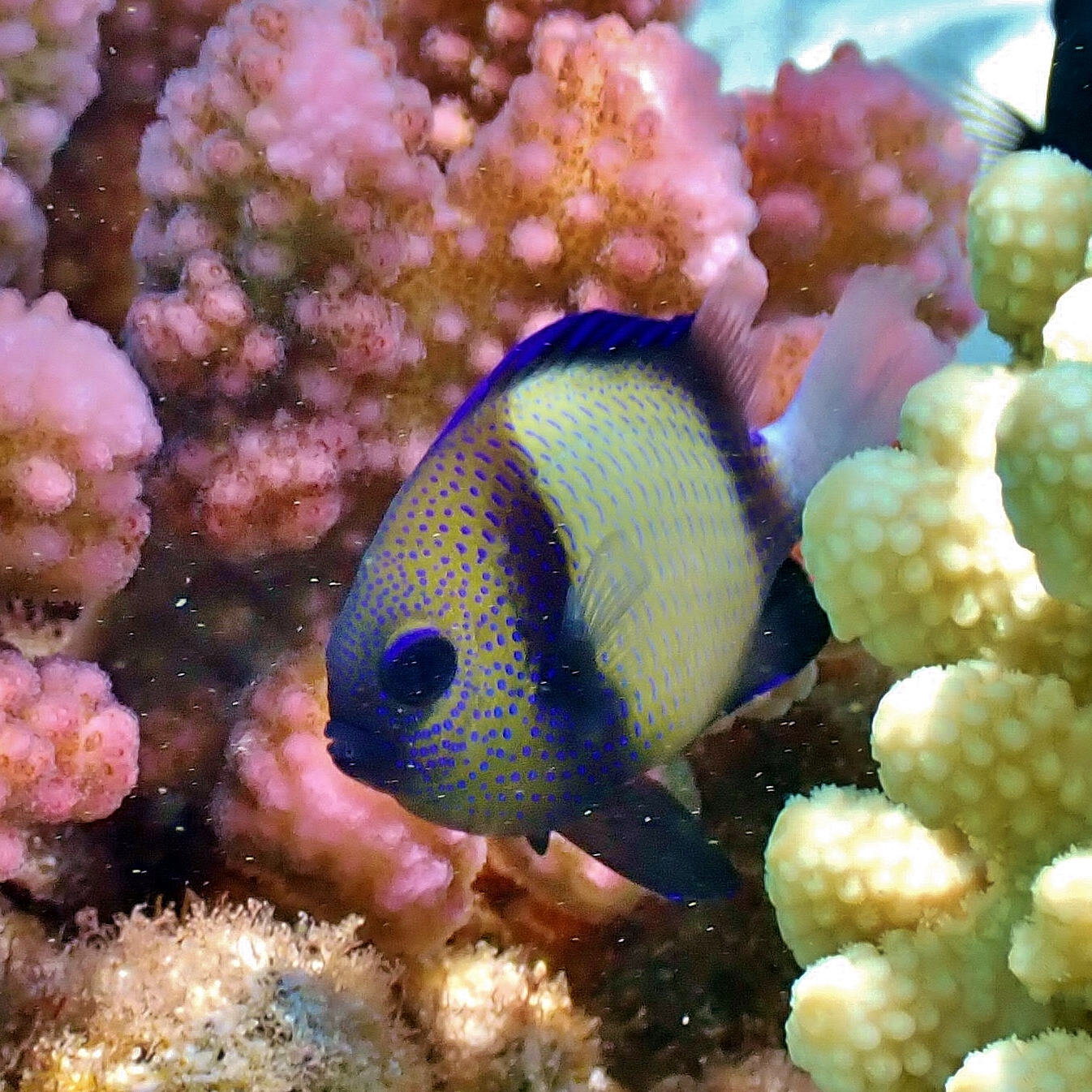

Conservation status
- Least Concern (IUCN 3.1)

Scientific classification
- Kingdom: Animalia
- Phylum: Chordata
- Class: Actinopterygii
- Order: Blenniiformes
- Family: Pomacentridae
- Genus: Dascyllus
- Species: D. carneus

Binomial name
- Dascyllus carneus Fischer, 1885

= Dascyllus carneus =

Species of fish

Dascyllus carneus, known commonly as the cloudy dascyllus or Indian dascyllus among other vernacular names, is a species of marine fish in the family Pomacentridae.

Cloudy dascyllus is widespread throughout the tropical waters of the Indian Ocean from the eastern coast of Africa to Java Sea.

Cloudy dascyllus is up to 7 centimetres (2.8 in) in length.

== In aquarium ==
It is very similar to Dascyllus reticulatus. They have similar behavior in aquarium tank. As it grows up, it will become very aggressive. They chase small peaceful fishes but avoid to provoke ferocious fishes.
