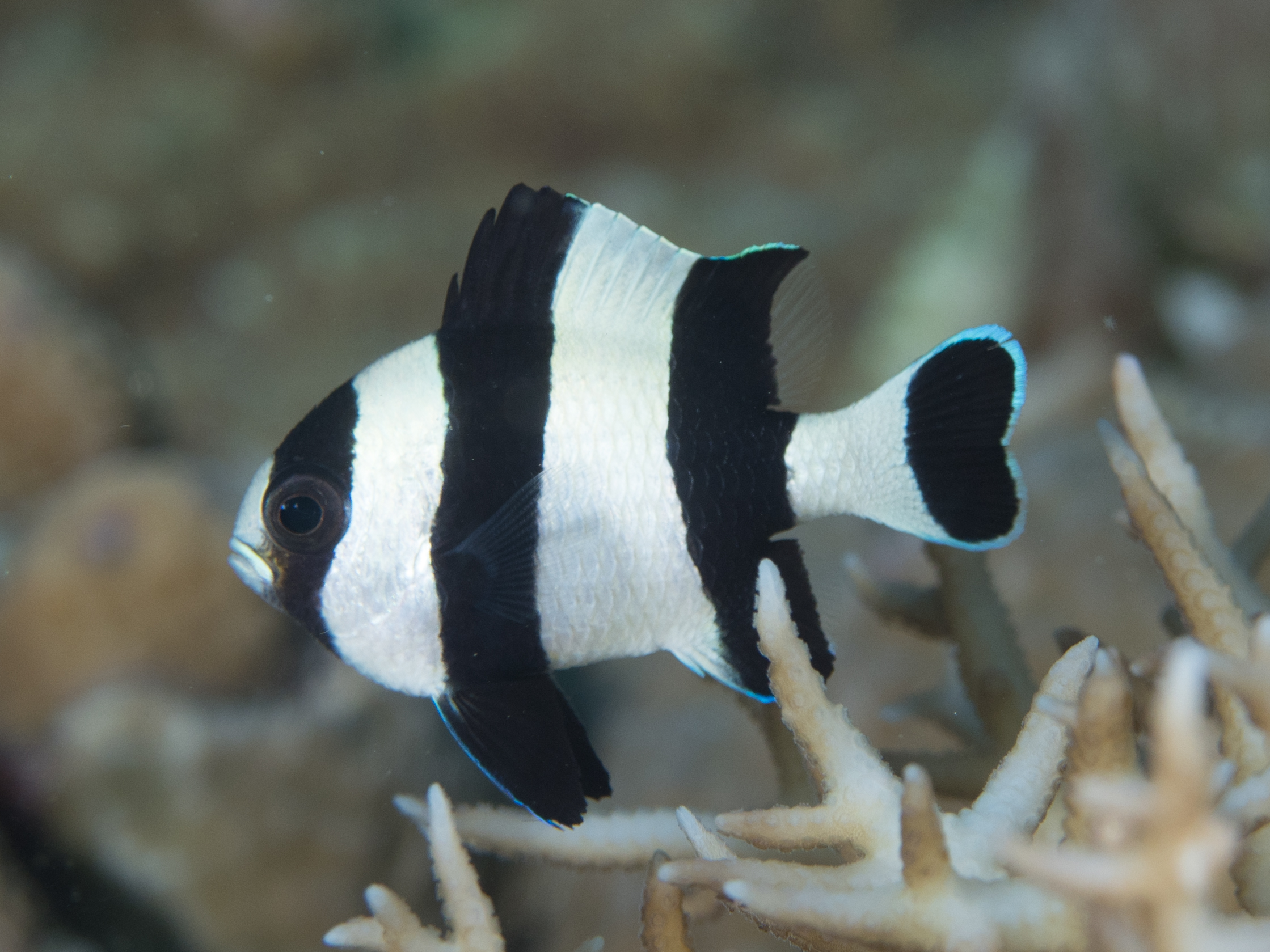

Conservation status
- Least Concern (IUCN 3.1)

Scientific classification
- Kingdom: Animalia
- Phylum: Chordata
- Class: Actinopterygii
- Order: Blenniiformes
- Family: Pomacentridae
- Genus: Dascyllus
- Species: D. melanurus

Binomial name
- Dascyllus melanurus Bleeker, 1854

= Dascyllus melanurus =

Species of fish

Dascyllus melanurus, known commonly as the four stripe damselfish, blacktail dascyllus, humbug damselfish, blacktail damselfish, and blacktail humbug, is a species of fish in the family Pomacentridae. It is native to the western Pacific Ocean. It is sometimes kept as an aquarium pet.

== Description ==
The four striped damselfish is commonly found in Indo-Australian Archipelago and western Caroline Islands including Indonesia, Philippines, New Guinea, and the northern Great Barrier Reef of Australia. They are found at depths down to 33 feet, and it is associated with isolated coral heads in sheltered inshore habitats. Like all damselfish, they can be territorial and aggressive, especially as they get older. Four-striped Damselfish typically grow to about three or four inches. The less common species name is Dascyllus melanurus. They are also omnivores, eating anything ranging from algae to small fish or shrimp. Three alternating black and white vertical bands make up the body coloration with a fourth black band ending at the tail.

== Behavior ==
It travels in schools. It feeds on fish eggs, crustacean larvae, algae, ostracods, amphipods, copepods, and tunicates.

== In aquarium ==
Juvenile school size can be up to 25. Sometimes, a juvenile would like to live alone. Adult is very aggressive and territorial.
