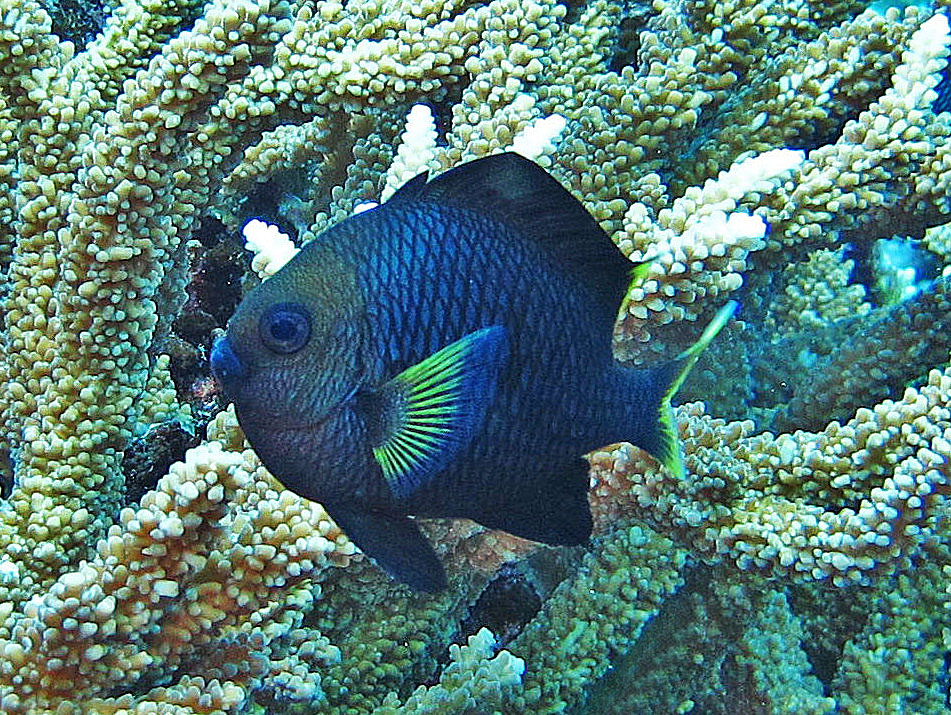
- Yellowtail dascyllus

Conservation status
- Least Concern (IUCN 3.1)

Scientific classification
- Kingdom: Animalia
- Phylum: Chordata
- Class: Actinopterygii
- Order: Blenniiformes
- Family: Pomacentridae
- Genus: Dascyllus
- Species: D. flavicaudus

Binomial name
- Dascyllus flavicaudus Randall & Allen, 1977

= Dascyllus flavicaudus =

Species of fish

Dascyllus flavicaudus, common name yellowtail dascyllus, is a Damselfish belonging to the family Pomacentridae.

== Distribution ==
These damselfish can be found in the Eastern Central Pacific, in the southeastern Oceania, including Society Islands, Tuamoto Islands, Pitcairn Islands, and Rapa Nui. It occasionally makes its way into the aquarium trade.

== Habitat ==
This tropical species is reef-associated and non-migratory. It occurs in coral and rocky reefs at depths of 3 to 40 m.

== Description ==
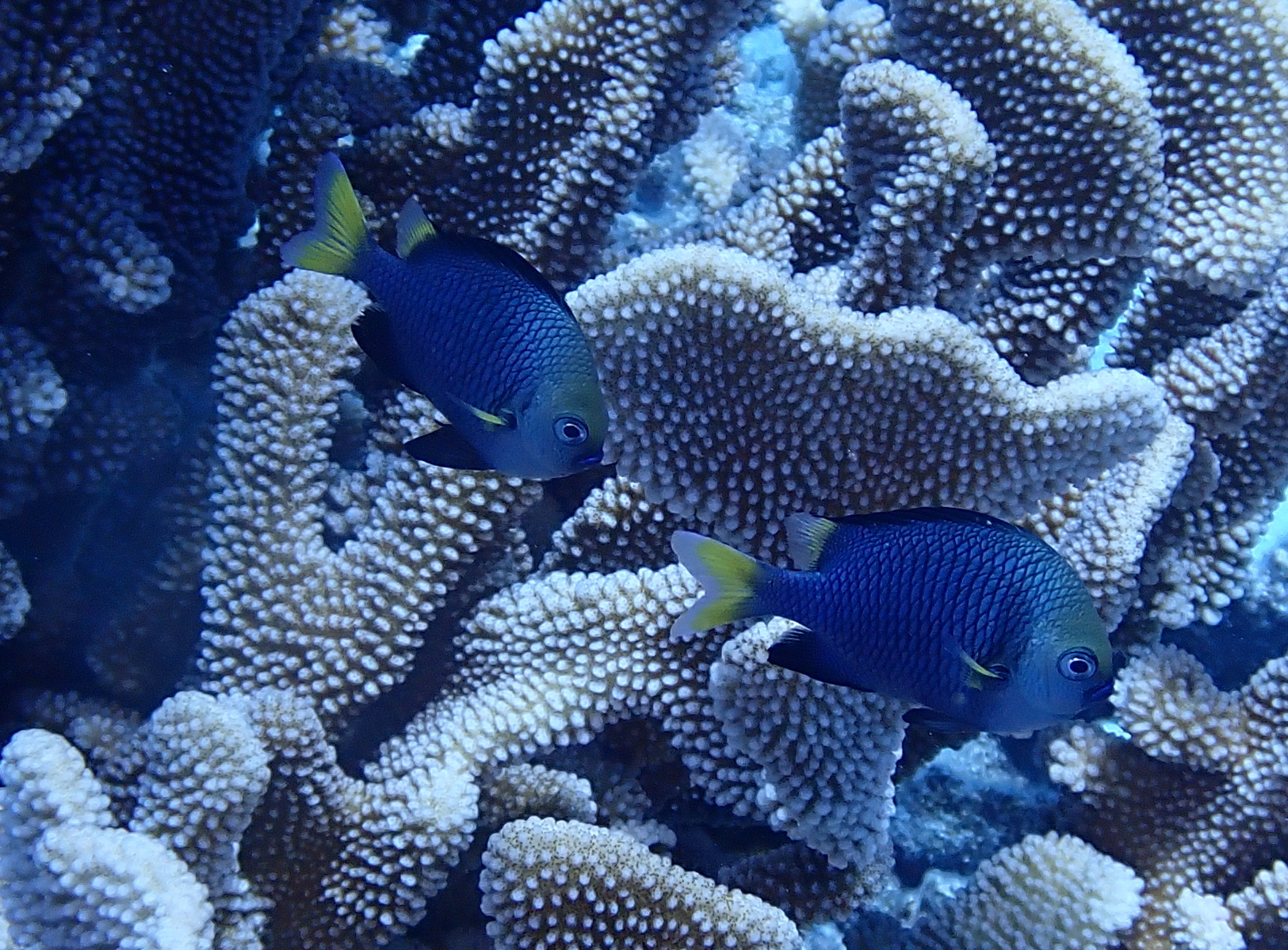
In French Polynesia

Dascyllus flavicaudus can grow to a size of 12 cm in length. These fishes have a very high body, with a ratio of 1 / 1.4-1.6 (body height / body length).

With the exception of the yellowish to yellowish-white tail and the bright rear portion of the dorsal fin, their body is dark, blackish-brown to blackish-bluish. The dark edges of the scales make a net drawing. They show 12 dorsal spines, 15-16 dorsal soft rays, 2 anal spines and 13-14 anal soft rays. During matings time the males usually turn a shade or two darker, sometimes with white spots.

== Biology ==
These fishes have just one of at least two distinct sexes in any one individual organism (Gonochorism). They are oviparous and non-functional hermaphrodite. They mainly feed on copepods, other small planktonic crustaceans and algae. Adults form a permanent harem, with one male and several females close to coral heads. They are substrate spawners and stick their spawn in a cave or hidden niche. Males guard and aerate the eggs that adhere to the substrate.

== Bibliography ==
- Eschmeyer, William N., ed. 1998. Catalog of Fishes. Special Publication of the Center for Biodiversity Research and Information, núm. 1, vol. 1–3. California Academy of Sciences. San Francisco, California. ISBN 0-940228-47-5.
- Fenner, Robert M.: The Conscientious Marine Aquarist. Neptune City, USA: T.F.H. Publications, 2001.
- Gerald R. Allen: Riffbarsche der Welt. Mergus Verlag, Melle 1991, ISBN 3-88244-007-4
- Helen A. Randall, Gerald R. Allen: A revision of the damselfish genus Dascyllus (Pomacentridae) with the description of a new species. Records of the Australian Museum (1977) Volume: 31, Issue: 9, Pages: 349–385 ISSN 0067-1975 doi:10.3853/j.0067-1975.31.1977.217
- Helfman, G., B. Collette y D. Facey: The diversity of fishes. Blackwell Science, Malden, Massachusetts, USA, 1997.
- Hoese, D.F. 1986: . A M.M. Smith y P.C. Heemstra (eds.) Smiths' sea fishes. Springer-Verlag, Berlín.
- Moyle, P. y J. Cech.: Fishes: An Introduction to Ichthyology, 4th. ed, Upper Saddle River, New Jersey, USA: Prentice-Hall. 2000.
- Nelson, J.: Fishes of the World, 3rd. e.. New York: John Wiley and Sons. 1994.
- Wheeler, A.: The World Encyclopedia of Fishes, 2nd. Ed., London: Macdonald. 1985.
