= Kaliseptine =

Sea anemone toxin

Kaliseptine (AsKS) is a neurotoxin which can be found in the snakelocks anemone Anemonia viridis. It belongs to a class of sea anemone neurotoxins that inhibits voltage-gated potassium channels.

== Etymology ==
“Kali” is derived from the Latin word [kalium], which means potassium. The suffix “septine” is derived from the Greek word “sepsis” [σῆψις], which means “decay” or “putrefaction”. This suffix was added to distinguish it from the related toxin kalicludine. Kaliseptine was first isolated from the snakelocks anemone, which at the time was called Anemonia sulcata. Kaliseptine is abbreviated as AsKS, which stands for Anemonia sulcata KaliSeptine.
The rational nomenclature of kaliseptine is kappa-actitoxin-Avd6a. The first letter Kappa indicates its molecular target, namely a voltage-gated potassium channel. Actitoxin is a neurotoxin derived from the Actiniidae. Avd denotes that it is extracted from Anemonia viridis. Finally, 6a specifies that this was the sixth Acititoxin of which the full-length amino acid sequence was published and that this is the first isoform.

== Sources ==
Kaliseptine was first isolated from the snakelocks anemone Anemonia viridis, previously known as Anemonia sulcata. The snakelocks anemone releases its venom via both nematocysts and ectodermal glands. Kaliseptine is a type I anemone toxin. Although typically the type I toxins are located in both organelles, the location for kaliseptine has not yet been reported.

== Biochemistry ==
Kaliseptine is a 36 amino acid peptide and contains three disulfide bonds. Kaliseptine shows structural similarities with other sea anemone toxins like Actinia equina K^{+}-channel toxin (AeK), Bunodosoma granulifera K^{+}-channel toxin (BgK) and Stichodactyla helianthus K^{+}-channel toxin (ShK). These toxins can be classified as type I voltage-gated potassium channel inhibiting peptides, based on their size and structure. Type I peptide toxins typically consist of 35 to 37 amino acids and show a high rate of homology in amino acid sequence.
The residues which are demonstrated to be most essential for potassium channel binding are the adjacent Lys-24 and Tyr-25, which are conserved in all four orthologous peptides. The allosteric effects of this binding have not been reported.

== Target ==
Kaliseptine competitively binds the dendrotoxin (DTX_{I}) receptor domain on the voltage-gated potassium channel K_{V}1.2. The IC_{50} for inhibition of the K_{V}1.2 K^{+} channel by kaliseptine is 140 nM as compared to 2.1 nM by DTX_{I} itself. The K_{V}1.2 channel is important for reducing action potential frequency and facilitating repolarisation following an action potential. It is not known whether kaliseptine has any additional targets, like DTX_{I} does.

== Mode of action ==
Kaliseptine has been shown to reduce ion current through the K_{V}1.2 K^{+} channel during depolarization. Since it has affinity for the DTX_{I} receptor domain, kaliseptine may act on the channel in a similar manner as the agonist DTX_{I}. Whether kaliseptine exerts its action by hindering conformational changes of the K_{V}1.2 channel, is not certain. Evidence was provided that DTX_{I} binds in close proximity to the external mouth of the channel, leading to occlusion of the pore. It is not certain whether this partial occlusion fully explains the inhibiting effect. The exact mechanism by which Kaliseptine alters K_{V}1.2 function is still debated. Kaliseptine is thought to act in conjunction with other neurotoxins present in the snakelocks anemone venom, altogether prolonging the action potential.

== Toxicity ==
Limited in vitro studies were performed on the toxic effects of isolated kaliseptine. The combined venom of the snakelocks anemone is known to be toxic when applied directly onto mammalian hearts. The venom then causes an increase of the action potential duration. When the nematocysts of the snakelocks anemone come into contact with human skin, the venom can cause redness, swelling and pain.

== Treatment ==
There is no known treatment for intoxication with kaliseptine. The suggested treatment for the venom of snakelocks anemone consists of symptomatic treatment and prevention of further nematocyst discharge.
