= Sea anemone neurotoxin =

Anemone neurotoxin
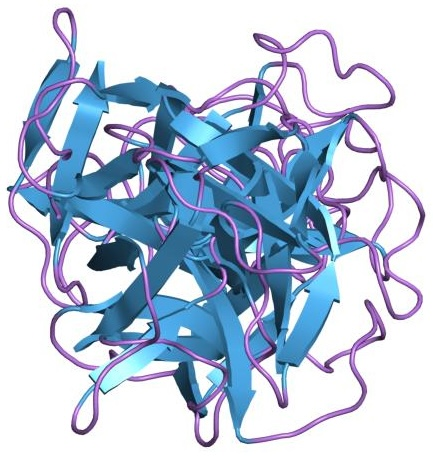
- Structure of the neurotoxin ATX Ia from Anemonia sulcata.

Identifiers
- Symbol: Toxin_4
- Pfam: PF00706
- Pfam clan: CL0075
- InterPro: IPR000693
- SCOP2: 1atx / SCOPe / SUPFAM
- OPM superfamily: 54
- OPM protein: 1apf
Available protein structures:
- PDB: IPR000693 PF00706 (ECOD; PDBsum)
- AlphaFold: IPR000693; PF00706

Antihypertensive protein BDS-I/II
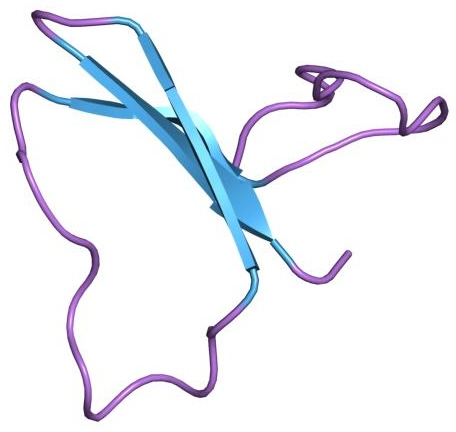
- Structure of the antihypertensive and antiviral protein BDS-I from the sea anemone Anemonia sulcata.

Identifiers
- Symbol: BDS_I_II
- Pfam: PF07936
- Pfam clan: CL0075
- InterPro: IPR012414
- SCOP2: 2bds / SCOPe / SUPFAM
- OPM superfamily: 54
- OPM protein: 1bds
Available protein structures:
- PDB: IPR012414 PF07936 (ECOD; PDBsum)
- AlphaFold: IPR012414; PF07936

Sea anemone neurotoxin is the name given to neurotoxins produced by sea anemones with related structure and function. Sea anemone neurotoxins can be divided in two functional groups that either specifically target the sodium channel or the potassium channel.

A number of proteins belong to the sodium channel toxin family, including calitoxin and anthopleurin. The neurotoxins bind specifically to the sodium channel, thereby delaying its inactivation during signal transduction, resulting in strong stimulation of mammalian cardiac muscle contraction. Calitoxin 1 has been found in neuromuscular preparations of crustaceans, where it increases transmitter release, causing firing of the axons. Three disulfide bonds are present in this protein.

This family also includes the antihypertensive and antiviral proteins BDS-I (P11494) and BDS-II (P59084) expressed by Anemonia viridis (previously Anemonia sulcata). BDS-I is organised into a triple-stranded antiparallel beta-sheet, with an additional small antiparallel beta-sheet at the N-terminus. Both peptides are known to specifically block the Kv3.4 potassium channel, and thus bring about a decrease in blood pressure. Moreover, they inhibit the cytopathic effects of mouse hepatitis virus strain MHV-A59 on mouse liver cells, by an unknown mechanism.

The potassium channel toxin family include kaliseptine and kalicludines, and was also isolated from Anemonia viridis.

== See also ==
- AETX
- Halcurin
- Cangitoxin
- Ugr 9-1
