= HmK toxin =

Sea anenome toxin

HmK is a toxin from the tropical sea anemone Heteractis magnifica, a cnidarian. The sea anemone releases the toxin through stinging organelles called nematocysts located on the tentacles, which gets released in case of danger. It is predominantly a potassium channel toxin; therefore, it blocks potassium currents through Kv1.2, Kv1.3, and the KcsA channels.

AlphaFold predicted structure of the HmK toxin. Colours indicate the confidence of the predicted structure. Image adapted from UniProt.

== Etymology ==
The name HmK is an abbreviation, consisting of two parts. The first 'Hm' is derived from the sea anemone Heteractis magnifica, the origin of the channel toxin. The second,'K', is the representation of the chemical symbol for potassium reflecting the workings of the toxin, since it blocks potassium channels.

== Sources ==
HmK is a toxin from the tropical sea anemone Heteractis magnifica, a cnidarian. The venom of this sea anemone is produced by specialized cells called the cnidocytes and are mainly found on the mucus of the tentacles. The venom of the sea anemone includes two types of peptide toxins: sodium channel toxins and predominantly potassium channel toxins. These toxins either alter the channel gating or block the conduction of the ion channels. Most of the discovered toxins in this species inhibit Kv1 channels.

== Chemistry ==
The toxin HmK consists of 35 amino acids. The sequence of the amino acids is: R^{1}TCKDLIPVS^{10}ECTDIRCRTS^{20}MKYRLNLCRK^{30}TCGSC^{35} which has a homology of 60% with the toxin ShK and 40% homology with the toxins BgK and AsKS. A 74 amino acid polypeptide precursor is encoded by the coding region of HmK cDNA and of these 74 amino acids the first 39 compose the signal peptide. HmK belongs to the sea anemone type 1 potassium channel toxins (SAK1), which consists of small peptides of 35-37 residues. These peptides are stabilized by three disulfide bonds, which holds the peptide in its folded position.

== Target ==
HmK targets voltage gated potassium channels, specifically of the Kv1 subfamily. Moreover, HmK also blocks the KcsA pores and blocks Kv1.3. In binding experiments HmK displaces α-dendrotoxin, a snake toxin that also binds to potassium channels, which shows HmK acts on the same channel class. The channels are blocked through a pore blocking mechanism with conserved Lys22. Since Lys22 interacts with the potassium ions, the dissacociation of the toxin depends on the membrane voltage.

== Mode of action ==
HmK was found to block Kv1.3, Kv1.2, and KscA pores. The toxin binds to the outer pore of the channel and releases if the voltage across the membrane changes. The potassium flowing out of the cell can knock the toxins of the pores. If more potassium flows out, then the toxin releases faster.

== Toxicity ==
The lethal dose 50 (LD50) has not been established. The toxin increases twitch responses in chick-nerve muscle preparations and it is consistent with facilitated acetylcholine release in chick tissue.
