= AsKC11 =

Toxin found in the venom of the sea anemone

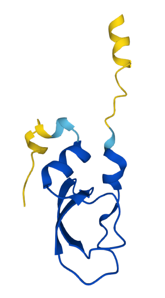
- 3D structure AsKC11

Identifiers
- Organism: Anemonia sulcata
- Symbol: N/A
- Orthologs: OMA: entry
- UniProt: P0DN15
Search for
- Structures: Swiss-model
- Domains: InterPro

AsKC11 (also known as U-actitoxin-Avd3n or U-AITX-Avd3n) is a toxin found in the venom of the sea anemone, Anemonia sulcata. This toxin is part of the Kunitz peptide family and has been shown to be an activator of G protein-coupled inwardly rectifying potassium (GIRK) channels 1/2, involved in the regulation of cellular excitability.

== Etymology ==
The name AsKC11 is an acronym for Anemonia sulcata kalicludine, the species it originates from and its predicted mechanism of action.

== Sources ==
AsKC11 is a peptide that can be purified from the venom of the Mediterranean snakelocks sea anemone, Anemonia sulcata. A. sulcata is sometimes also referred to as Anemonia viridis.

== Chemistry ==
=== Structure ===
AsKC11 is characterized by a single polypeptide sequence of 59 amino acid residues, in its mature form, containing six cysteine residues. The peptide is stabilized by three disulfide bridges.

The amino acid sequence of the Kunitz peptide AsKC11:

INKDCLLPKVVGFCRARFPRYYYNSSSRRCEKFIYGGCGGNANNFSSYYECHIKCFGPR

=== Homology ===
AsKC11 exhibits sequence homology with other venom Kunitz-type peptides from various species, such as DTX-1 (extracted from black mamba venom) and APHC1 (extracted from leathery sea anemone venom). In Basic Local Alignment Search Tool (BLAST), twenty proteins showed more than 70% similarity with AsKC11. All originate from the Anemonia genus, and the majority originate from A. viridis.

=== Family ===
AsKC11 belongs to the toxin Kunitz-type peptide family and is considered part of the sea anemone type 2 potassium channel toxin subfamily. Kunitz-type peptides are found in several species such as scorpions, snakes, spiders, and sea anemones. All Kunitz peptides share the Kunitz domain, which is characterized by a peptide chain of approximately 60 amino acid residues, rich in cysteine. The domain is stabilized by three disulfide bonds and contains an alpha and beta fold. Kunitz peptides modulate the activity of different ion channels and inhibit proteases (Kunitz inhibitors). Unlike AsKC11, AsKC1-3, which are also Kunitz peptides, block voltage-gated potassium channels. Additionally, they show protease inhibition. AsKC11 is expected to execute protease inhibition as well and it is the first Kunitz peptide to be an activator of GIRK1/2 channels. Besides affecting potassium channels, other Kunitz peptides are known to inhibit voltage-gated sodium and voltage-gated calcium channels.

== Target ==
AsKC11 targets inward-rectifier potassium channels (K_{ir}). More specifically, it activates GIRKs 1/2 channels (heterotetrameric protein), predominantly in cardiac cells and in the brain. This peptidic activation is direct, the G_{i} protein alpha subunit is not involved. Additionally, AsKC11 has the ability to activate the homotetrameric GIRK2 channel. AsKC11 has no effect on K_{ir}2.1 or the voltage-gated potassium channels, K_{v}1.1-1.4 channels, and showed a small inhibition of K_{v}1.6. channels.

AsKC11 binding is reversible. For GIRK1/2 channel activation induced by AsKC11, at a concentration of 48 μM of AsKC11, the first order-association rate constant (K_{on}) is 5.71 × 10^{−3} s^{−1}T and the second-order association rate constant (α) is 7.82 × 10^{−5} μM^{−1}s^{−1}. The first-order dissociation rate constant (K_{off} = β) is 6.33 × 10^{−3} s^{−1}. The calculated equilibrium dissociation constant to represent the affinity of AsKC11 to GIRK1/2 channels has been found to be 80.9 μM. Under the assumption of a linear relationship between the channel occupancy and the response, EC50 = 80.9 μM.

== Mode of action ==
AsKC11 has shown to be an activator of GIRK1/2 channels. These channels are involved in the regulation of cellular excitability. GIRK channels become activated following G protein-coupled receptor (GPCR) activation. Heterotrimeric G protein (Gβγ) subunits dissociate from the Gβγ and activate GIRK channels via binding of this subunit to the GIRK channel. AsKC11 can activate GIRK1/2 channels without an activated G_{i/o} GPCR. GIRK1/2 activation increases inward rectification of potassium, which aids in resting membrane maintenance and regulation of the length and shape of action potentials. The membrane potential of neurons becomes hyperpolarized, causing a reduction in action potential firing. The inward potassium current is dependent on the concentration of AsKC11. The reversal potential (close to 0 mV) is not affected by AsKC11-induced currents through GIRK1/2 channels. The current amplitude increases, which is presumed to be due to the higher chord conductance of GIRK1/2 channels.
