= CGX (disambiguation) =

CGX may refer to:

- Cangitoxin, toxin purified from the venom of the sea anemone Bunodosoma cangicum
- CG(X), proposed U.S. cruiser class
- Chunga Airstrip, Chunga, Zambia, IATA airport code CGX
- Cineplex Entertainment, TSX code CGX
- CyberGraphX, ReTargetable Graphics API
- Meigs Field, Chicago, Illinois, FAA LID code CGX
