= Kalicludine =

Kalicludine (AsKC) is a blocker of the voltage-dependent potassium channel Kv1.2 found in the snakeslocks anemone Anemonia viridis (Anemonia sulcata), which it uses to paralyse prey.

== Etymology ==
"Kali", abbreviated from the Latin word "kalium", equals potassium. "Cludine" means to block or to enclose, as it is derived from the Latin verb "cludere".

== Source, family and homology ==
Kalicludine (uniprot ID: Q9TWG0) is also known as KappaPI-actitoxin-Avd3b or as Kunitz-type serine protease inhibitor kalicludine-1. Thus, kalicludines are part of the Kunitz-type inhibitor superfamily. The Kunitz-type scaffold is found both in inhibitors of proteolytic enzymes and in toxins. Other members of this superfamily are the pancreatic trypsin inhibitors (BPTI), which are potent Kunitz-type protease inhibitors, and dendrotoxins. Kalicludine has 40% homology with BPTIs. The most represented sequences of this group corresponds with kalicludine-3 and kalicludine-4, a recently found polypeptide.

A. sulcata kalicludines include AsKC1, AsKC2, and AsKC3., which are related to Bunodosoma granulifera toxin k (BgK) and Stichodactyla helianthus toxin k (ShK). A different, less abundant, protein is AsKC1a, which has a supplementary residue at the C-terminus when compared with kalicludine-1. Furthermore, a level of amino acid sequence identity and similarity of ≥43% and ≥50% was found between both A. sulcata Kunitz-type protease inhibitors SA5 II, SA5 III and AsKC1 – AsKC15.

Kalicludine has 48% identity with the amyloid A4 homologue, which is implicated in Alzheimer's disease.

== Structure ==
The kalicludine isotoxins have similar molecular size and a similar biological function. They contain three amino acid residues that are important for trypsin binding: Lys-15, Ala-16, and Ile-19 in BPTI. AsKCs have a replacement at position 19 (Ile → Pro), which results in less inhibitory action than BPTI.

== Mode of action ==
Kalicludine is stored in nematocysts or located in extracellular regions. It is known to be a dual-function toxin, able to inhibit both the serine protease trypsin (Kd=30 nM) and the voltage-gated potassium channels Kv1.2/KCNA2 (IC_{50}=2800 nM). Kalicludines and dendrotoxins compete for binding to these Kv channels.

The kalicludine sequence is homologous to the sequence of dendrotoxins, in particular DTX 1 (dendrotoxin 1), potent blockers of Kv channels. Kalicludines have from 38 to 42% homologies with DTX. Both kalicludines and dendrotoxins increase the release of acetylcholine and enhance the duration of action potentials (AP).

== Toxicity and symptoms ==
Kv channel blocking dendrotoxins, and thus possibly also kalicludines, often lead to overstimulation of the cholinergic system, and subsequently to neuromuscular block and cardiovascular depression.
