= CgNa toxin =

Toxin isolated from a sea anemone

CgNa is a peptide toxin isolated from the sea anemone Condylactis gigantea. It causes an increased action potential duration by slowing down the inactivation of tetrodotoxin-sensitive sodium channels.

== Etymology and source ==
"Cg" is an abbreviation for Condylactis gigantea, a giant Caribbean sea anemone from which the venom is isolated. "Na" indicates the effect of CgNa on sodium channels.

== Chemistry ==
CgNa is a polypeptide toxin with a measured mass of 5046 Da. CgNa comprises 47 amino acids residues with the following sequence; Gly-Val-Hyp-Cys-Arg-Cys-Asp-Ser-Asp-Gly-Pro-Ser-Val-His-Gly-Asn-Thr-Leu-Ser-Gly-Thr-Val-Trp-Val-Gly-Ser-Cys-Arg-Ser-Gly-Trp-His-Lys-Cys-Asn-Asp-Glu-Tyr-Asn-Ile-Ala-Tyr-Glu-Cys-Cys-Lys-Gln. It has six cysteine amino acids. They are linked by three disulfide bonds between residues at positions 4– 44, 6 –34 and 27– 45. The structure consists of four β-strands formed by residues at position 1–3, 21–23, 32–33 and 43–46. Furthermore, the polypeptide has three β-turns at residues 13–16, 27–30 and 31–34. The first two β-strands are connected by a long loop. CgNa is a member of a family of sea-anemone sodium-channel type 1 toxins. CgNa shares structural similarities and sequence homology with other anemone type 1 toxins such as ApA, ApB and ATX, and with the type 2 sodium channel toxin Sh1 of Stichodactyla helianthus. The most distinctive feature in the primary structure between CgNa and its related proteins lies in its difference in the distribution of electrostatic charge; CgNa contains more negatively charged residues and a lower percentage of exposed hydrophobic residues than is typical for type I and II toxins. This is likely to effect the binding of the toxin to sodium channels.

== Target ==
CgNa has an effect on tetrodotoxin-sensitive sodium channels. More specifically, in mammals it affects isoforms rNav1.3/β1, mNav1.6/β1; it has lower affinity to the cardiac isoform hNav1.3/β1. The toxin seems to have no effect on other mammalian Nav channel subtypes, although its effect on subtype rNav1.1 and Nav1.9 has not been tested. Besides having an effect on mammalian Nav channels, CgNa also exhibits an effect on the insect DmNav1/tipE channel.

== Mode of action ==
CgNa slows the inactivation of tetrodotoxin-sensitive sodium currents and thereby increases the action potential duration. It preferentially binds to the closed state of the channel; it shifts the voltage-dependence of the steady-state inactivation of the sodium channels to more negative values, and also speeds up the recovery from inactivation. The toxin induces this effect acting from the extracellular side of the plasma membrane. On mammalian sodium channels, the type I toxins target receptor site 3. Their effect on slowing down sodium channel inactivation leads to neurotoxic (repetitive firing) and cardiotoxic (arrhythmia) effects. The action of CgNa is not use-dependent, as activation of the sodium channels by repetitive stimuli does not increase the effectiveness of CgNa. The toxin has an effect on the sodium channels within 1 minute of application and is partially reversible after removal and wash out.

== Toxicity ==
CgNa has a strong paralytic activity on crabs with LD50 of approximately 1 mg/kg. Studies using both mammalian and insect cloned Nav channels subtypes showed that CgNa expresses phylum selectivity. As such, it causes more profound increases in peak current and slows the inactivation of Nav channels of insects more profoundly compared to mammalian Nav channels.

== Treatment ==
The inactivation effects of 10 μM application of CgNa on cultured rat dorsal ganglion neurons for 1 to 20 minutes exposure time seem to be fully reversible with repeated washout of the preparation. When using cloned insects' sodium channels, application of the same toxin levels were not reversible.
