= BGK =

BGK may refer to:

== Commerce ==
- Bank Gospodarstwa Krajowego, a Polish bank
- The ISO 4217 code for the second Bulgarian lev

== Music ==
- Beyoncé Giselle Knowles, an American singer

== Science ==
- Bernstein–Greene–Kruskal modes, a type of nonlinear electrostatic wave that propagates in a collisionless plasma
- Bhatnagar–Gross–Krook operator, a collision operator used in Lattice Boltzmann methods
- BgK, a neurotoxin found within the mucous secretions of sea anemones

== Sports ==
- Barangay Ginebra Kings, a professional Philippine basketball team
