= Halcurin =

Halcurin is a polypeptide neurotoxin from the sea anemone Halcurias sp. Based on sequence homology to type 1 and type 2 sea anemone toxins it is thought to delay channel inactivation by binding to the extracellular site 3 on the voltage gated sodium channels in a membrane potential-dependent manner.

== Source and etymology ==
The polypeptide toxin halcurin is named after its source: the sea anemone genus Halcurias, which are ocean dwelling solitary invertebrates.

== Chemistry ==
The amino acid sequence of halcurin is: VACRCESDGP DVRSATFTGT VDLWNCNTGW HKCIATYTAV ASCCKKD; it consists of 47 amino acids and has a molecular weight of 5,086 Da

== General information ==
A classification of sea anemone polypeptide neurotoxins has been proposed based on their amino acid sequence, dividing the group into three classes of sodium channel toxins. Halcurin is structurally homologous with type 2 toxins, but also has sequence homology to type 1 toxins. Type 1 and 2 toxins are composed of 46 to 49 amino acid residues, and cross-linked by three disulfide bridges. Ten residues including six Cysteine (Cys) residues are completely conserved between type 1 and 2 toxins. Therefore, it is possible that type 1 and 2 toxins have evolved from Halcurin as a common ancestor.

== Target ==
Type 1 and 2 toxins are known to target neurotoxin receptor site 3. Based on the structural homology of halcurin with sea anemone toxin type 1 and 2 it is likely to target neurotoxin receptor site 3. Neurotoxin receptor site 3 is predicted to be at the domain IV of voltage gated sodium channel, more specifically at the extracellular loop of segment 3-4. These voltage gated sodium channels are found in neurons, skeletal muscles, and cardiac muscles.

== Mode of action ==
The domain III and IV intracellular loop structure acts as a fast inactivation gate in voltage gated sodium channels. Sea anemone toxin type 1 and 2 slow or prevent the conformational changes in domain IV segment 3-4 loop required for inactivation of the channel. Based on the structural homology of halcurin to sea anemone neurotoxin type 1 and 2, it is likely to have a similar mode of action.

== Toxicity ==
Halcurin has a median lethal dose (LD_{50}) of 5.8 μg/kg for crabs, but it does not show lethality in mice.
