= BgK =

Sea anemone toxin

BgK is a neurotoxin found within secretions of the sea anemone Bunodosoma granulifera which blocks voltage-gated potassium channels, thus inhibiting neuronal repolarization.

== Etymology ==
The neurotoxin was named BgK, with the Bg representing the Latin taxonomy (Bunodosoma granulifera) of the specific sea anemone from which the toxin was found, and the K standing for the chemical symbol for potassium due to its observed effects on K^{+} channels.

== Sources in nature ==
BgK can be found in the mucus of Bunodosoma granulifera, a common sea anemone found along the coasts of Cuba. Since it is a contracting sea anemone, it has two forms based on the position of its tentacles: open and closed. BgK is released when the anemone is in the closed form, a position it assumes during the day or during times of agitation. In this form, the anemone’s tentacles retract, releasing a mucus from a fibrous matrix found in the mesoglea, a space between the ectodermis and the gastrodermis. For every gram of freeze-dried mucus, there is 0.5 mg BgK.

== Chemistry ==
BgK is composed of 37 amino acid residues, and three disulfide bonds. The neurotoxin belongs to a family of toxins found within 3 different sea anemones. The two other anemone/toxin combinations are: Stichodactyla helianthus and ShK; Anemonia viridis and AsKs. All three of these toxins have an affinity to dendrotoxin sensitive potassium channels that are found within rat brain membranes. BgK and ShK attenuate K^{+} channels in the neurons of rat dorsal ganglia, in vitro. AsKs stops potassium channel currents that are present in Xenopus oocytes. These toxins potentially represent a new structural type of potassium channel inhibitor. Compared to the short and well-studied scorpion toxins, these anemone toxins have comparable amino acid content (35-37 residues) and the same number of disulfide bridges (three). However, these anemone toxins do not share any sequential similarity. Specifically, the different position of the cysteine residues found within these toxins suggests that BgK, ShK, and AsKS are a new family of toxins.

The only homology BgK shares is with a double-headed protease inhibitor found in sea turtles, however it is only limited to a part of the inhibitor, with the largest similarity found with the cysteine residues, which compose six of the eight conserved amino acids found in the two sequences.

== Target ==
BgK blocks the Kv1.1, Kv1.2, and Kv1.3 channels with similar affinities. IC50 is 6 nM for Kv1.1, 15 nM for Kv1.2, and 10 nM for Kv1.3. Meanwhile, tests on the Kv3 channel, specifically Kv3.1, show that the ion channel exhibits an insensitivity of up to 0.125 μM BgK.

== Mode of action ==
BgK competes with I-α-dendrotoxin, a known probe used to indicate the presence of certain potassium channels, over binding to synaptic membranes within rat brains. The binding sites of the toxin between Kv1.1, Kv1.2, and Kv1.3 were found to include three common amino acid residues: Lys-25, Tyr-26, and Ser-23. This combination appear to form the core residues that are the site of binding of all Kv1 channel blockers from sea anemones. In particular with Kv1.1, the major reason for BgK's affinity towards binding to this specific channel stems from an electrostatic connections between the side chain of Lys-25 and the carbonyl oxygens of the amino acids found within the channel's molecular filter. Another aspect of BgK's binding to Kv1.1 involves the hydrophobic reactions between Tyr-379 of Kv1.1 and the dyad of Tyr-26 and Phe-6 formed within BgK. Such interactions have been found to surround the Lys-25 and could potentially strengthen the electrostatic interactions that can form between this specific lysine and the oxygen atoms of the channel's filter.

== Toxicity ==
The median lethal dose (LD_{50}) of BgK for mice is 4.5 ng per gram. Symptoms observed include trembling of the tail, muscle twitch, salivation, and paralysis, which are the generally observed physical manifestation of potassium channel blockers.

== Therapeutic Use ==
While BgK has been produced in Escherichia coli as a functional protein, exhibiting all of the effects on potassium channels found with BgK isolated from its natural source, there has been no research into any potential therapeutic purpose so far, with most of its use being for research on potassium channels.
