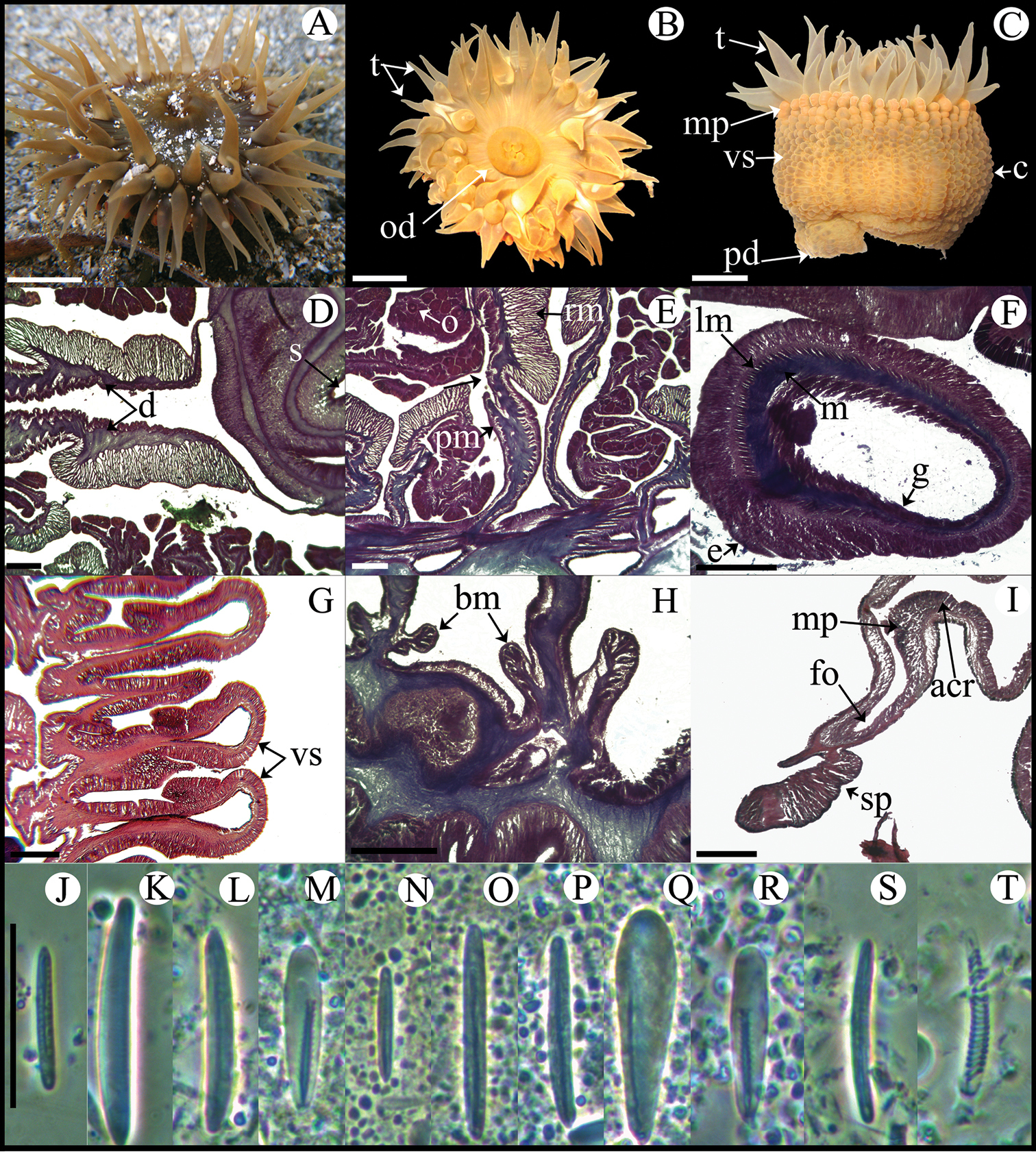

Scientific classification
- Kingdom: Animalia
- Phylum: Cnidaria
- Subphylum: Anthozoa
- Class: Hexacorallia
- Order: Actiniaria
- Family: Actiniidae
- Genus: Bunodosoma
- Species: B. cavernatum

Binomial name
- Bunodosoma cavernatum (Bosc, 1802)

Synonyms
- Actinia cavernata Bosc, 1802; Anthopleura cavernata (Bosc, 1802); Bunodes cavernata Verrill; Bunodosoma cavernata (Bosc, 1802); Phymactis cavernata (Bosc, 1802); Urticina cavernata (Bosc, 1802)

= Bunodosoma cavernatum =

Species of sea anemone

Bunodosoma cavernatum, commonly known as the warty sea anemone or the American warty anemone, is a species of sea anemone in the family Actiniidae. It occurs in the tropical and subtropical western Atlantic Ocean and the Caribbean Sea. It was first described in 1802 by the French naturalist Louis Augustin Guillaume Bosc, one of fourteen marine invertebrates described and named by him.

== Description ==
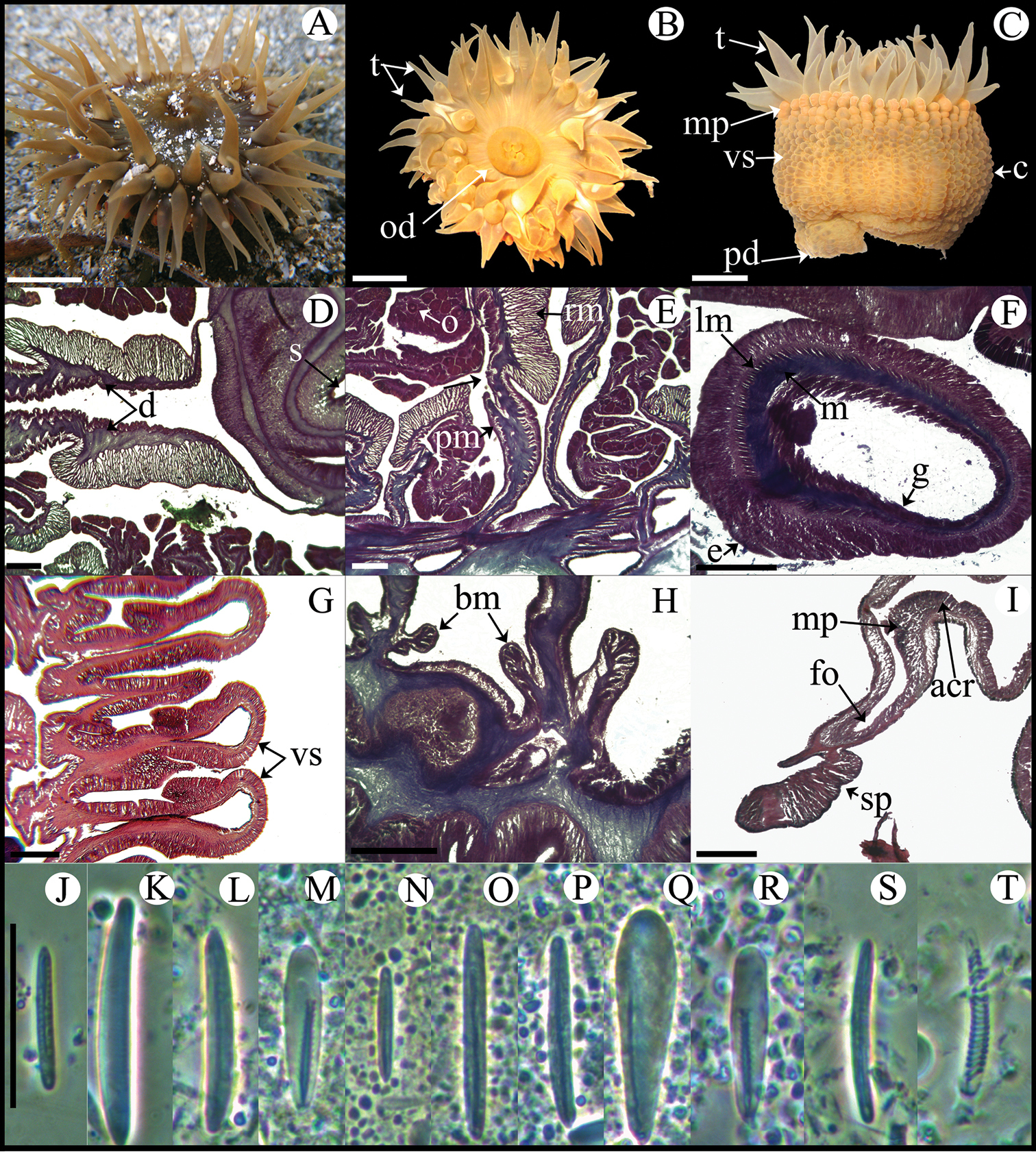
Bunodosoma cavernatum A. Live specimen in natural habitat, B. Oral view, C. Lateral view, D.-I. Sections, J.–T. Cnidae

Bunodosoma cavernatum is a robust species with a muscular trunk covered with 96 vertical rows of small, rounded, wart-like vesicles. The oral disc is smooth and the approximately 96 tentacles are arranged in five cycles. Each tentacle is of moderate length, smooth and tapering, the inner tentacles being longer than the outer ones. At their base are about 48 rounded lobular projections called acrorhagi which are armed with stinging cells.

The colour of the trunk varies, being some shade of olive green, orange, red or brown. The tentacles are olive green, pale orange or reddish, with the oral disc being yellowish-brown, reddish-brown or olive green, sometimes with faint pale radial striping. When fully extended this sea anemone can reach 15 mm (0.6 in) in height, and the tentacles and oral disc when extended can reach 40 mm (1.6 in) in diameter.

== Distribution and habitat ==
Bunodosoma cavernatum is native to the tropical and subtropical western Atlantic Ocean and the Caribbean Sea, its range extending from North Carolina to Texas, including Florida and the West Indies. It occurs in the lower part of the intertidal zone on rocks and jetties, and on other hard substrates underlying gravelly or sandy bottoms.

== Ecology ==
Bunodosoma cavernatum is nocturnal; during the night it expands and spreads out its tentacles to feed but during the day, it contracts into a reddish gelatinous blob. It feeds on small fish and any invertebrates that are encountered by its tentacles. The remains of a scorched mussel (Brachidontes exustus) have been found inside one individual.
