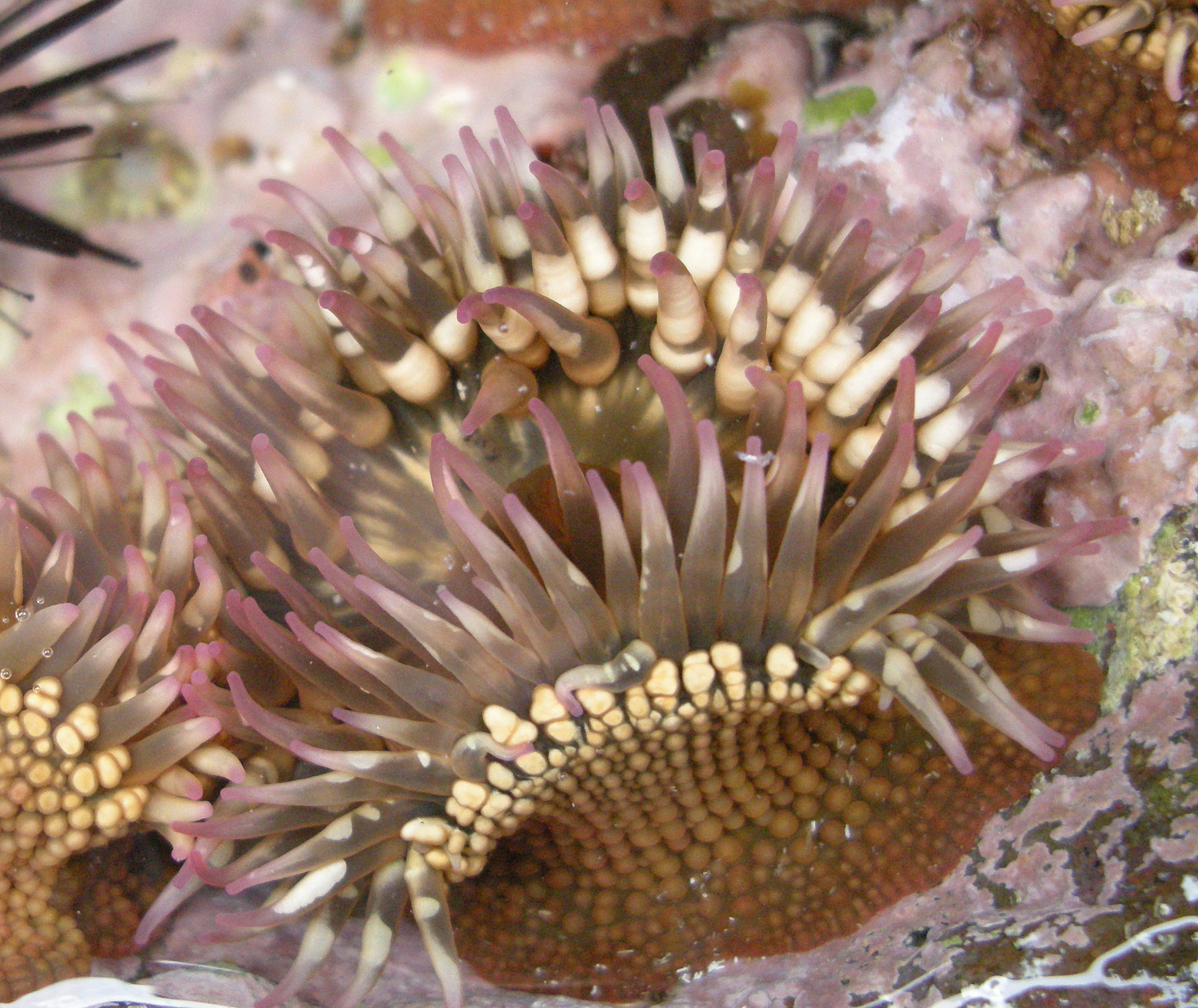

Scientific classification
- Domain: Eukaryota
- Kingdom: Animalia
- Phylum: Cnidaria
- Class: Hexacorallia
- Order: Actiniaria
- Family: Actiniidae
- Genus: Bunodosoma
- Species: B. californicum

Binomial name
- Bunodosoma californicum (Carlgren, 1951)

Synonyms
- Bunodosoma californica Carlgren, 1951

= Bunodosoma californicum =

Species of sea anemone

Bunodosoma californicum is a species of sea anemone. It was first described to science by Oskar Carlgren in 1951. The type specimen that Carlgren used to describe the species was collected by Ed Ricketts in Puerto Escondido during his trip to the Gulf of California with John Steinbeck recounted in The Log From the Sea of Cortez.

== Description ==
The column is variable in color from olive green to greenish-brown to rusty red. The column may be up to 40 millimetres (1.6 in) tall, with a base between 20 millimetres (0.79 in) and 30 millimetres (1.2 in) wide. The column is covered in rounded bumps called vesicles. Unlike some similar sea anemones, these vesicles are not adhesive, and thus the column of Bunodosoma californica will typically be clean, not covered with bits of shell or other detritus. The vesicles are arranged in neat longitudinal rows at the base of the column and more random, but still densely packed, further up the column. They are about the same color as the column.

The oral disc is the same color as the column and may have light radial lines.

There are typically 80 conical tentacles arranged in three or four rings around the oral disc, but individuals vary and may have more or fewer tentacles. The basic color of the tentacles is the same as the column, and some individuals may show rose, purple or orange tints. The tentacles are often marked with white at their base. Tentacles are slightly shorter than the width of the oral disc.

== Distribution ==
Bunodosoma californicum lives on rocky bottoms from the intertidal zone to the subtidal. It can be found from the Gulf of California to Panama.

== Life history ==
Bunodosoma californium is a carnivore. It uses the stinging cells, nematocysts, in its tentacles to paralyze its prey. The tentacles then push the food into the mouth in the center of the oral disc.

These anemones are gonochoric, that is there are two sexes and each animal is either male or female. They reproduce by broadcast spawning, releasing eggs and sperm into the sea to achieve fertilization. Some anemones are able to reproduce by fission, in essence cloning themselves. It is unknown whether this anemone is capable of asexual fission in addition to sexual reproduction.
