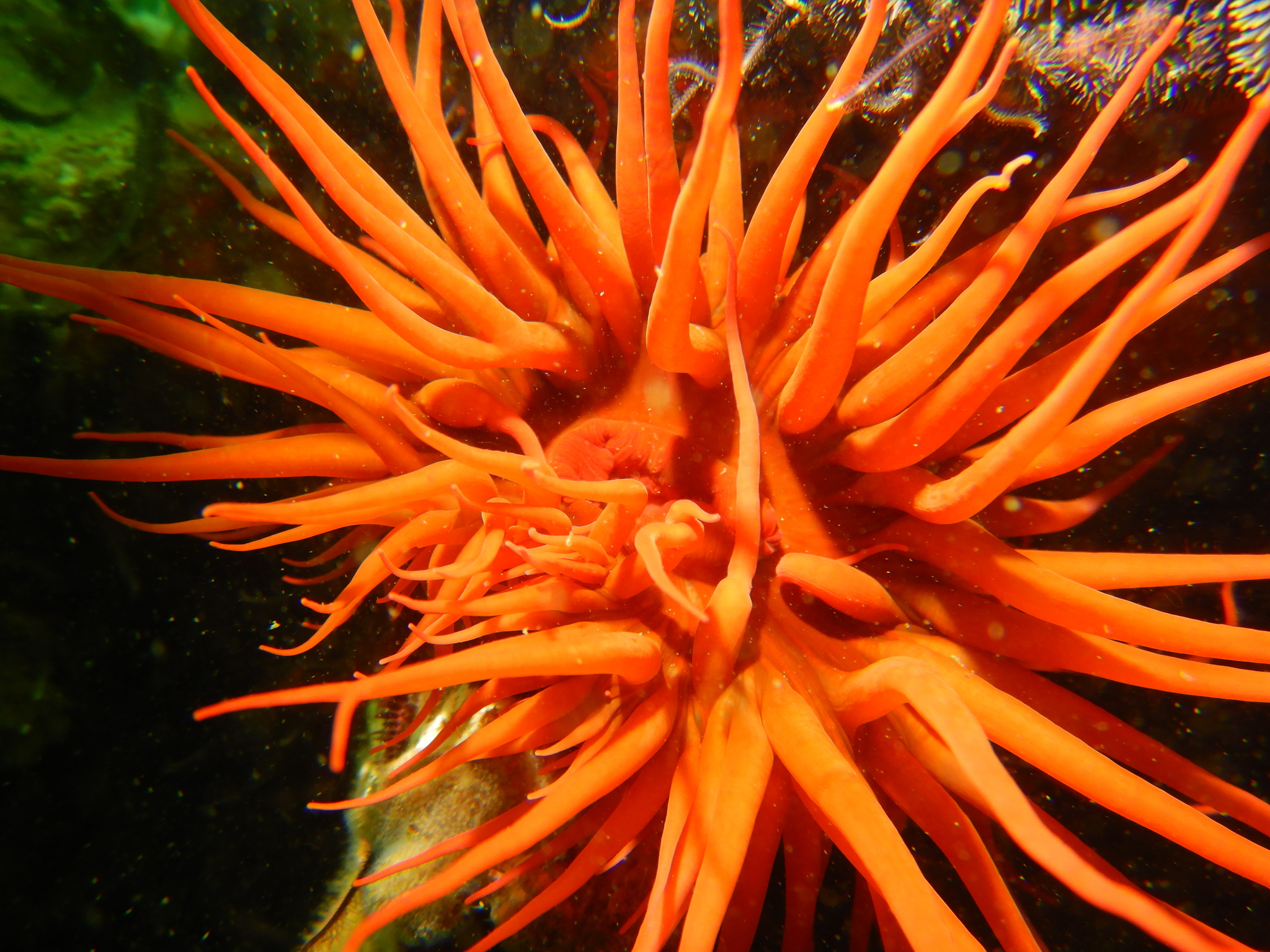
- Anemonia alicemartinae off the coast of central Chile in 2018.

Scientific classification
- Kingdom: Animalia
- Phylum: Cnidaria
- Subphylum: Anthozoa
- Class: Hexacorallia
- Order: Actiniaria
- Family: Actiniidae
- Genus: Anemonia
- Species: A. alicemartinae

Binomial name
- Anemonia alicemartinae Häussermann & Försterra, 2001

= Anemonia alicemartinae =

Cryptogenic species of sea anemone

Anemonia alicemartinae, commonly known as the sea rose, is a cryptogenic species of sea anemone in the family Actiniidae. It is named for its distinctive rose‑colored tentacles and bright red, bud‑like appearance. The species inhabits rocky intertidal zones along the northern and central coast of Chile and closely resembles Anemonia natalensis and Pseudactinia varia from South Africa.

== Description ==
Anemonia alicemartinae can easily be spotted off the coast of Chile from its bright red appearance. They are covered in a layer of mucus while submerged. It has a pedal disk diameter between 13–18 mm (0.51–0.71 in) for a medium‑sized sea anemone to attach itself, with tentacles reaching lengths of up to 17 mm (0.67 in). Their tentacles are normally bent toward the center to cover the oral disk, which contains the mouth used for feeding and waste expulsion.

== Distribution and habitat ==
Anemonia alicemartinae is distributed along the Chilean coast in intertidal zones and is one of the most abundant sea anemones in its region. They are generally found in groups of 5–10 in areas without direct wave surges. They can thrive up to a depth of 16 meters in tide pools, normally attached to bare rock. Data show temperature ranges from 13–23 °C and salinity ranges from 33–36‰ in their habitat. Over the past 50 years, its distribution has increased by >1900 km along the coast of the SE Pacific Ocean, making its expansion rate around 38 km yr⁻¹. Its latitude has extended from 18°S to 36°S. While its point of origin is unknown, scientific research points to the possible conclusion that it comes from southern Peru. The location of the highest population density was found to be off the coast of Arica.

As there has been a rapid spread of this possible invasive species of sea anemone, studies were conducted to determine its large-scale movements. Conducted by Arancibia Lopez, the results of his findings concluded that the colonization of new sites is caused by two dispersal mechanisms, short distance displacement, and long distance movement, as a result of both abiotic stress and biotic factors. The species does this by using a mechanism of detachment and readhesion to a substrate. This adhesion comes from the pedal disk, which is not very strong, as this animal can be easily removed and reattached, suggesting that human activity is another factor to blame for its increasing abundance.

== Life cycle ==
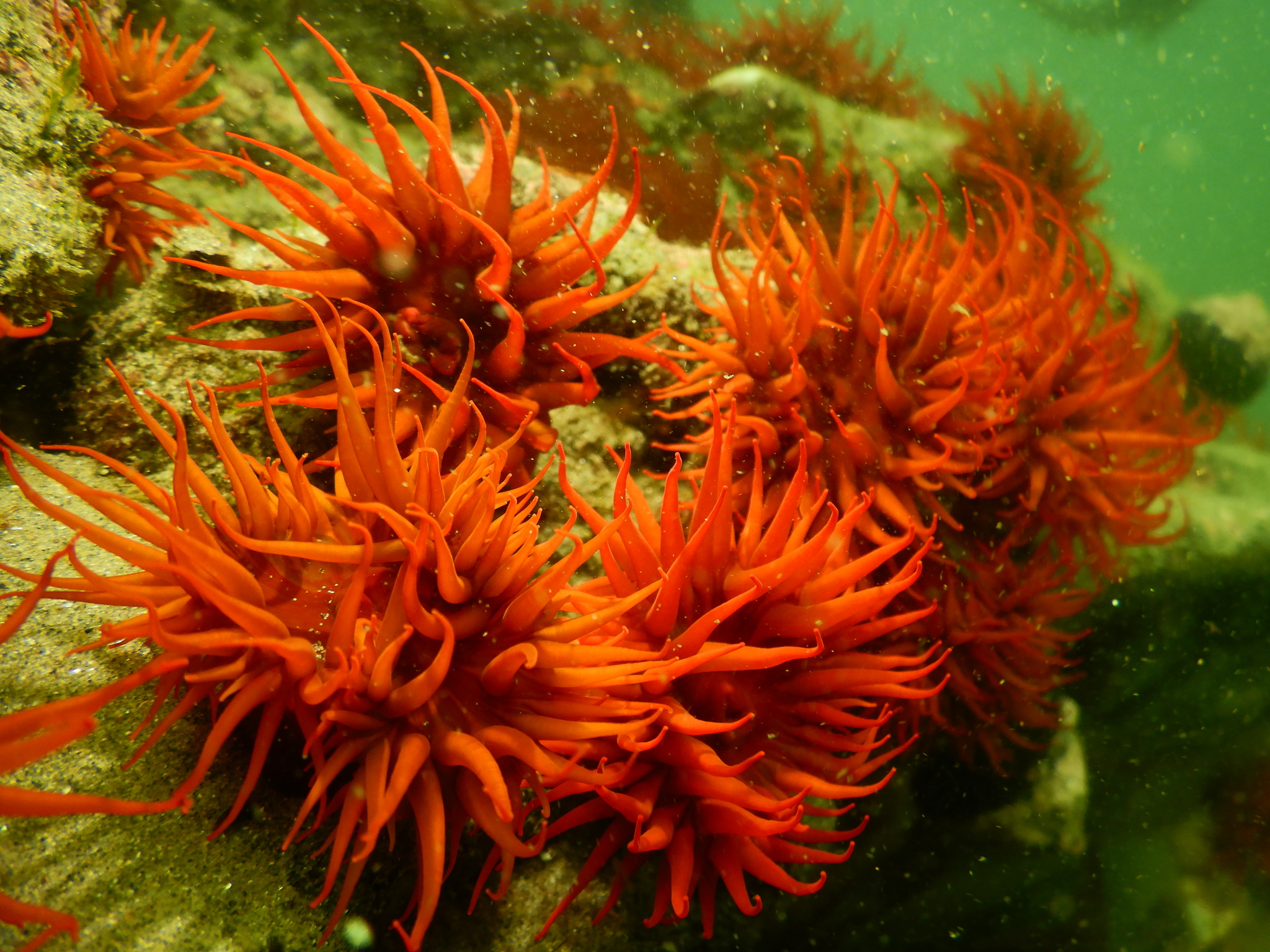
Group of A. alicemartinae off the coast of Chile in 2018.

The life cycle begins at the reproduction of this organism. Reproduction in A. alicemartinae occurs mainly through asexual fission as noted in the original description by Häussermann, who observed multiple scars on the organism, which is a sign of fission. The beginning life stages of A. alicemartinae do not include a larval phase, and the male sex has been proven to be infertile. Throughout the juvenile and adult stages, it disperses across chosen substrates through detachment and reattachment.

== Diet ==
Like all sea anemones, A. alicemartinae is carnivorous. They have been found to eat crabs, shrimp, sea urchins, macroalgae, polychaete worms, mussels, bivalves, and other sea anemones. They eat by using their stinging tentacles to release a paralyzing neurotoxin from specialized stinging cells called nematocysts into their prey. Afterward, the animal uses its tentacles to pull its food into its mouth.
