= Cangitoxin =

Purified sea anemone toxin

Cangitoxin, also known as CGTX or CGX, is a toxin purified from the venom of the sea anemone Bunodosoma cangicum, which most likely acts by prolonging the inactivation of voltage-gated sodium channels (Na_{V} channels).

== Sources ==
Cangitoxin is a polypeptide isolated from the venom of Bunodosoma cangicum, a common sea anemone species found in the intertidal zone during low tides on the coastal reefs of the Brazilian seashore.

== Chemistry ==
=== Structure ===
Cangitoxin belongs to the type 1 class sea anemone toxins, consisting of long polypeptides with short anti-parallel β–sheets and three disulfide bonds. Cangitoxin is a 4958 Da peptide, with the primary structure GVACRCDSDGPTVRGNSLSGTLWLTGGCPSGWHNCRGSGPFIGYCCKK and disulfide bonds Cys4-Cys45, Cys6-Cys35, and Cys28-Cys46. It contains 48 amino acid residues.

Substitution of the 16th amino acid, asparagine (N), into an aspartic acid (D) is named cangitoxin-II (CGTX-II). Cangitoxin-III (CGTX-III) contains in addition to the previous substitution, a replacement of the 14th amino acid, arginine (R), into histidine (H).

=== Homology ===
Cangitoxin is to varying degrees homologous to the other sea anemone toxins. The most prominent is the homology to the type 1 class sea anemone toxins (85%). The homology of cangitoxin to the type 2 and 3 class sea anemone toxins is less, respectively 50% and 30%. The major neurotoxin BcIII (BcIII) isolated from Bunodosoma caissarum is homologous to cangitoxin. It has two homologous amino acid substitutions (S17T and S19T) and one non-homologous substitution (V13S). This makes it 94% identical and 98% homologous to cangitoxin.

== Target and mode of action ==
Sea anemone toxins act on voltage-gated sodium channels (Na_{V}1.1, Na_{V}1.2, Na_{V}1.4, Na_{V}1.5, Na_{V}1.6, Na_{V}1.7) and depending on their affinity to a specific isoform, they mainly act on cardiac or neuronal voltage-gated sodium channels. Sea anemone toxins act at the receptor site 3. On the basis of its sequence homology, cangitoxin most likely acts on the same receptor site of the previously mentioned sodium channels. Neurotoxin receptor site 3 is localized on the extracellular side of the IVS4 transmembrane segment. The S4 segments of sodium channels move outward when the membrane depolarizes.

According to its sequence homology, it is likely that cangitoxin prolongs the inactivation of the voltage-gated sodium channels by binding on the external side of the plasma membrane, thereby preventing the outward movement of the IVS4 transmembrane segment. This blockage prevents the conformational change that is essential for inactivation. The prolongation of the inactivation has been demonstrated in experiments in which the effect of cangitoxin-II and –III on the Na_{V}1.1 channel was investigated.

== Toxicity ==
Intrahippocampal injection of 8 μg of cangitoxin in rats has strong behavioral effects, leading to akinesia interchanging with facial automatisms and head tremor, salivation, rearing, jumping, barrel-rolling, wet dog shakes and forelimb clonic movements. In addition, convulsions occur which gradually increase in duration, leading to a status epilepticus. The electroencephalogram shows spike-and-wave, which is typically seen during epileptic convulsions.

Lower intrahippocampal doses of cangitoxin (2-4 μg) do not lead to either behavioral or EEG alterations in rats. Higher doses of cangitoxin (12-16 μg) induce severe tonic-clonic convulsions, leading to death.
