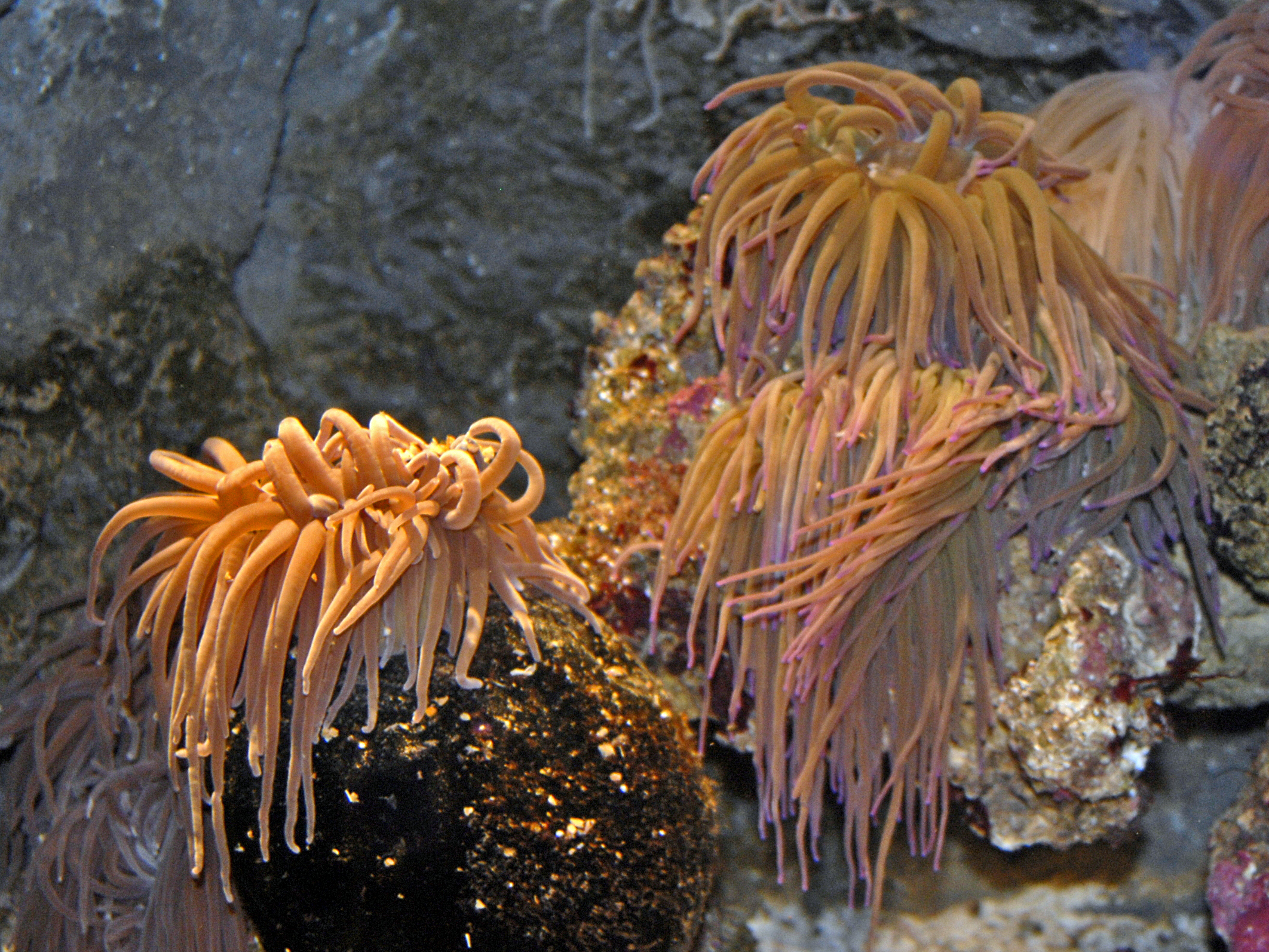
- Anemonia viridis

Scientific classification
- Domain: Eukaryota
- Kingdom: Animalia
- Phylum: Cnidaria
- Class: Hexacorallia
- Order: Actiniaria
- Family: Actiniidae
- Genus: Anemonia; Risso, 1826

Synonyms
- Anemone; Anenonia; Ceratactis Milne Edwards, 1857

= Anemonia =

Genus of sea anemones

Anemonia is a genus of sea anemones belonging to the family Actiniidae.

== Species ==
The following 21 species are recognized:

- Anemonia alicemartinae Häussermann & Försterra, 2001
- Anemonia antilliensis Pax, 1924
- Anemonia cereus Contarini, 1844
- Anemonia chubutensis Zamponi et Acuña, 1992
- Anemonia clavata (Milne Edwards, 1857)
- Anemonia crystallina (Hemprich et Ehrenberg in Ehrenberg, 1834)
- Anemonia depressa Duchassaing de Fonbressin et Michelotti, 1860
- Anemonia elegans Verrill, 1901
- Anemonia erythraea (Hemprich et Ehrenberg in Ehrenberg, 1834)
- Anemonia gracilis (Quoy et Gaimard, 1833)
- Anemonia hemprichi (Klunzinger, 1877)
- Anemonia indica Parulekar, 1968
- Anemonia insessa Gravier, 1918
- Anemonia manjano Carlgren, 1900
- Anemonia melanaster (Verrill, 1901)
- Anemonia milneedwardsii (Milne Edwards, 1857)
- Anemonia mutabilis Verrill, 1928
- Anemonia natalensis Carlgren, 1938
- Anemonia sargassensis Hargitt, 1908
- Anemonia sulcata (Pennant, 1777)
- Anemonia viridis (Snakelocks anemone) (Forskål, 1775)
