= KCNAB2 =

Protein-coding gene in humans

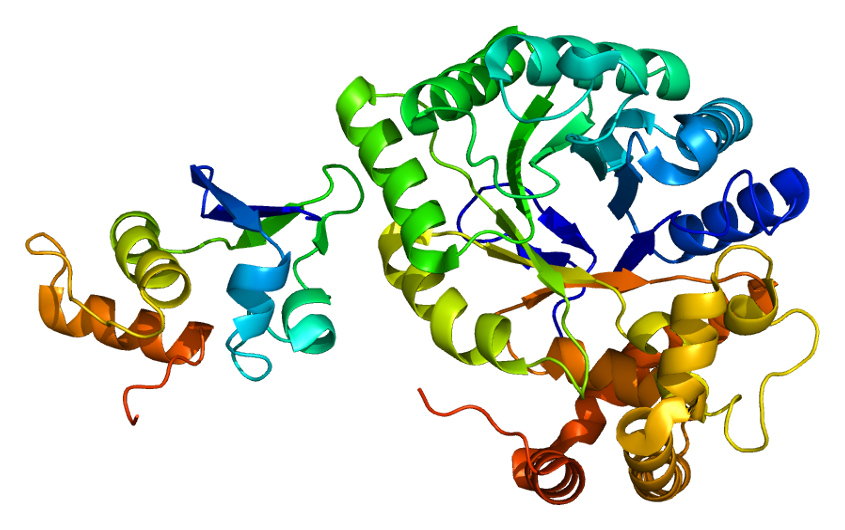

Identifiers
- Aliases: KCNAB2, AKR6A5, HKvbeta2, HKvbeta2.1, HKvbeta2.2, KCNA2B, KV-BETA-2, potassium voltage-gated channel subfamily A regulatory beta subunit 2
- External IDs: OMIM: 601142; MGI: 109239; GeneCards: KCNAB2
Available structures
PDB	Ortholog search: PDBe RCSB
PDB	List of PDB id codes 1ZSX

Gene location (Human)
Chr.	Chromosome 1 (human)
Band	1p36.31	Start	5,990,927 bp
Band	1p36.31	End	6,101,193 bp

Gene location (Mouse)
Chr.	Chromosome 4 (mouse)
Band	4 E2|4 83.08 cM	Start	152,475,199 bp
Band	4 E2|4 83.08 cM	End	152,562,367 bp
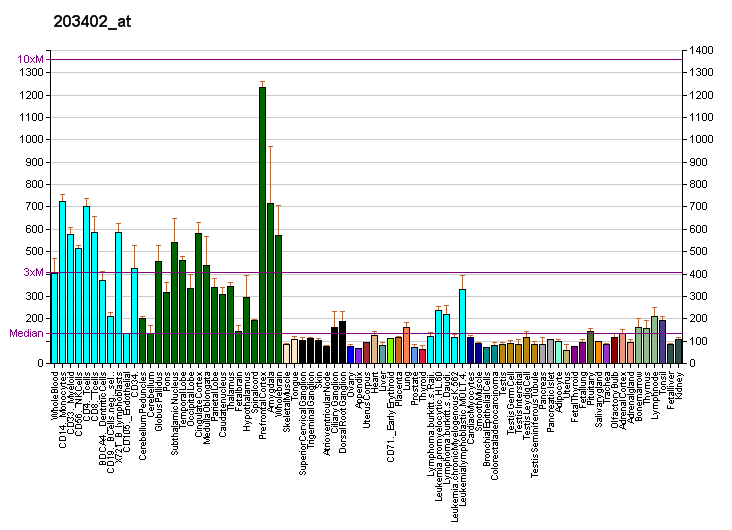

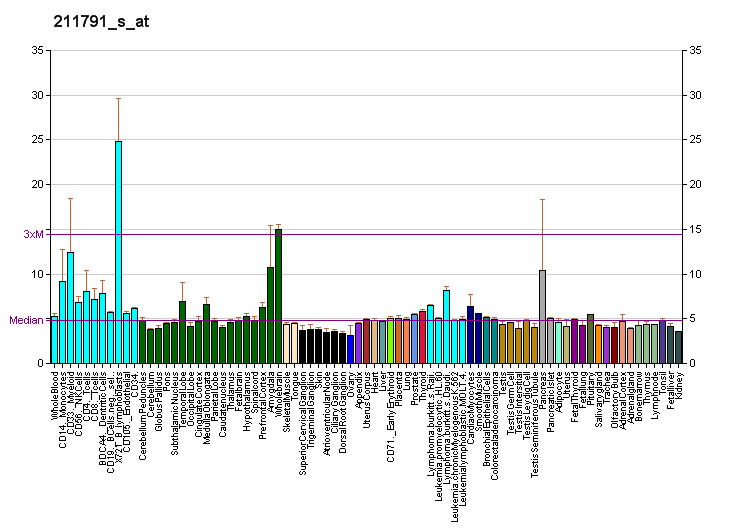
RNA expression pattern
Bgee	Human / Mouse (ortholog); Top expressed in: Brodmann area 10; right frontal lobe; pons; cingulate gyrus; anterior cingulate cortex; granulocyte; Brodmann area 9; nucleus accumbens; amygdala; spinal ganglia / Top expressed in: dentate gyrus of hippocampal formation granule cell; neural layer of retina; superior frontal gyrus; hippocampus proper; primary visual cortex; primary motor cortex; pontine nuclei; lateral geniculate nucleus; anterior horn of spinal cord; medial geniculate nucleus; More reference expression data
BioGPS	More reference expression data
Gene ontology
Molecular function	aldo-keto reductase (NADP) activity; voltage-gated ion channel activity; potassium channel regulator activity; voltage-gated potassium channel activity; oxidoreductase activity
Cellular component	axon terminus; cytoplasm; integral component of membrane; cytosol; cell projection; membrane; postsynaptic density; extrinsic component of cytoplasmic side of plasma membrane; voltage-gated potassium channel complex; plasma membrane; synapse; axon; cell junction; pinceau fiber; neuron projection; microtubule; cytoskeleton; juxtaparanode region of axon; specific granule membrane; tertiary granule membrane
Biological process	NADPH oxidation; regulation of protein localization to cell surface; regulation of ion transmembrane transport; ion transport; potassium ion transport; neuromuscular process; hematopoietic progenitor cell differentiation; potassium ion transmembrane transport; regulation of potassium ion transmembrane transport; neutrophil degranulation; ion transmembrane transport
Sources:Amigo / QuickGO
Orthologs
Databases	NCBI: entry; OMA: entry
Species	Human	Mouse
Entrez	8514	16498
Ensembl	ENSG00000069424	ENSMUSG00000028931
UniProt	Q13303	P62482
RefSeq (mRNA)	NM_001199860; NM_001199861; NM_001199862; NM_001199863; NM_003636 NM_172130	NM_001252654; NM_001252655; NM_001252656; NM_010598; NM_001355172 NM_001355173
RefSeq (protein)	NP_001186789; NP_001186790; NP_001186791; NP_001186792; NP_003627 NP_742128; NP_001186789.1; NP_001186790.1; NP_003627.1	NP_001239583; NP_001239584; NP_001239585; NP_034728; NP_001342101 NP_001342102
Location (UCSC)	Chr 1: 5.99 – 6.1 Mb	Chr 4: 152.48 – 152.56 Mb
PubMed search
- Wikidata
View/Edit Human	View/Edit Mouse

Voltage-gated potassium channel subunit beta-2 is a protein that in humans is encoded by the KCNAB2 gene.

== Function ==
Voltage-gated potassium (Kv) channels represent the most complex class of voltage-gated ion channels from both functional and structural standpoints. Their diverse functions include regulating neurotransmitter release, heart rate, insulin secretion, neuronal excitability, epithelial electrolyte transport, smooth muscle contraction, and cell volume. Four sequence-related potassium channel genes—shaker, shaw, shab, and shal—have been identified in Drosophila, and each has been shown to have human homolog(s). This gene encodes a member of the potassium channel, voltage-gated, shaker-related subfamily. This member is one of the beta subunits, which are auxiliary proteins associating with functional Kv-alpha subunits. This member alters functional properties of the KCNA4 gene product. Alternative splicing of this gene results in two transcript variants encoding distinct isoforms.

In melanocytic cells KCNAB2 gene expression may be regulated by MITF.

== Interactions ==
KCNAB2 has been shown to interact with KCNA2.

== See also ==
- Voltage-gated potassium channel
