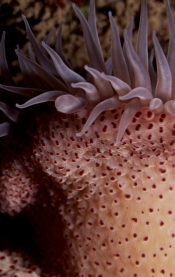

Scientific classification
- Kingdom: Animalia
- Phylum: Cnidaria
- Subphylum: Anthozoa
- Class: Hexacorallia
- Order: Actiniaria
- Family: Actiniidae
- Genus: Bunodosoma
- Species: B. capense

Binomial name
- Bunodosoma capense (Lesson, 1830)

= Bunodosoma capense =

Species of sea anemone

Bunodosoma capense, commonly known as the knobbly anemone, is a species of sea anemone in the family Actiniidae.

== Description ==
The knobbly anemone is a medium-sized anemone of up to 10 cm in diameter. It is variably coloured, and may be maroon, orange or purple, or even variegated. Its column is knobbly and the knobs are non-adhesive. The knobs sometimes contrast with the body colour as do the tentacles. It has small round protrusions (spherules) at the base of its tentacles.

== Distribution ==
It is found around the southern African coast from Luderitz to Durban. It inhabits waters from the intertidal to 19 m in depth.

== Ecology ==
The knobbly anemone is usually found on rocky ledges. Sand never sticks to its column, and it is often found attached to mussels or red bait, Pyura stolonifera.
