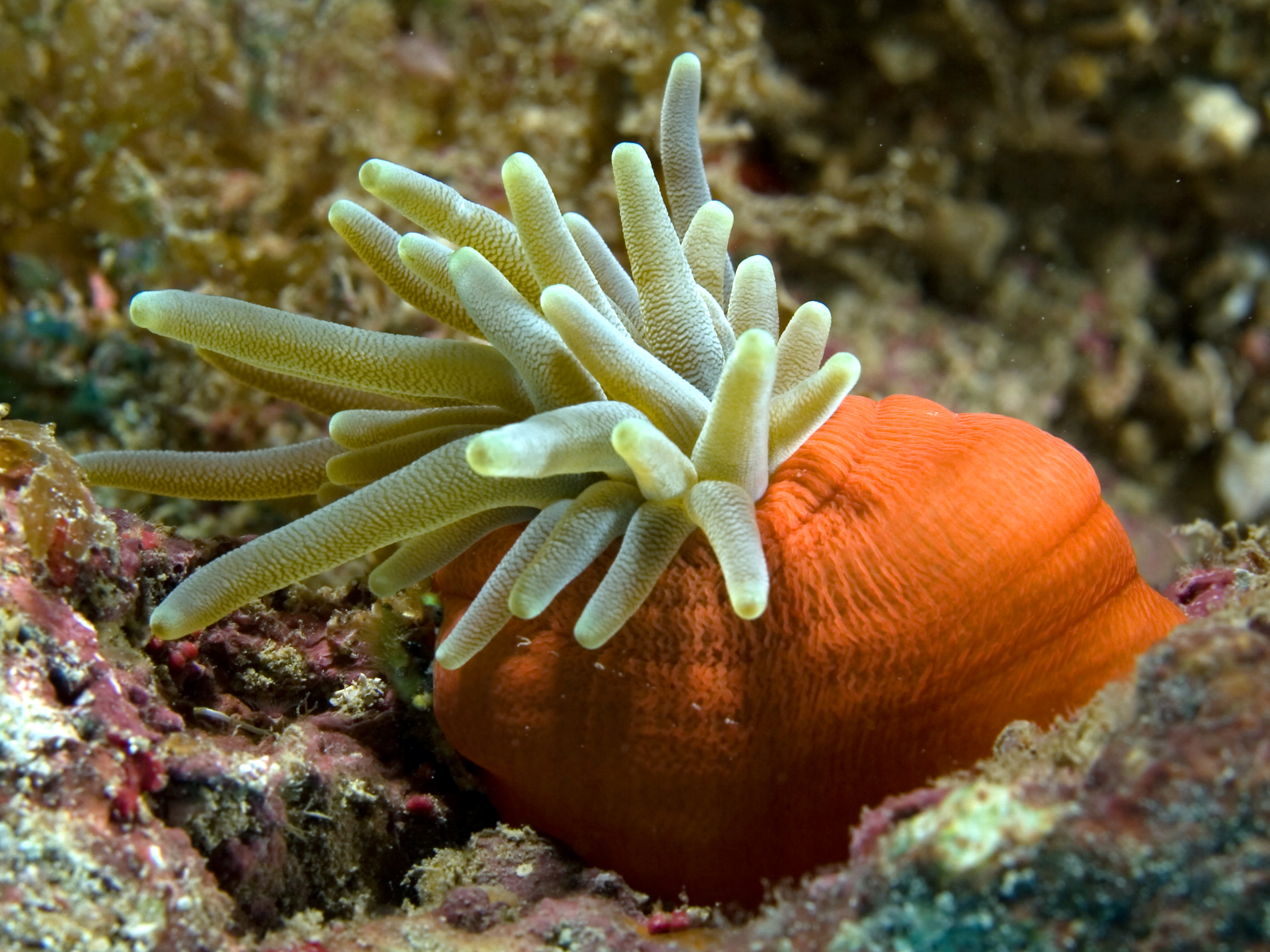
- Wild specimen
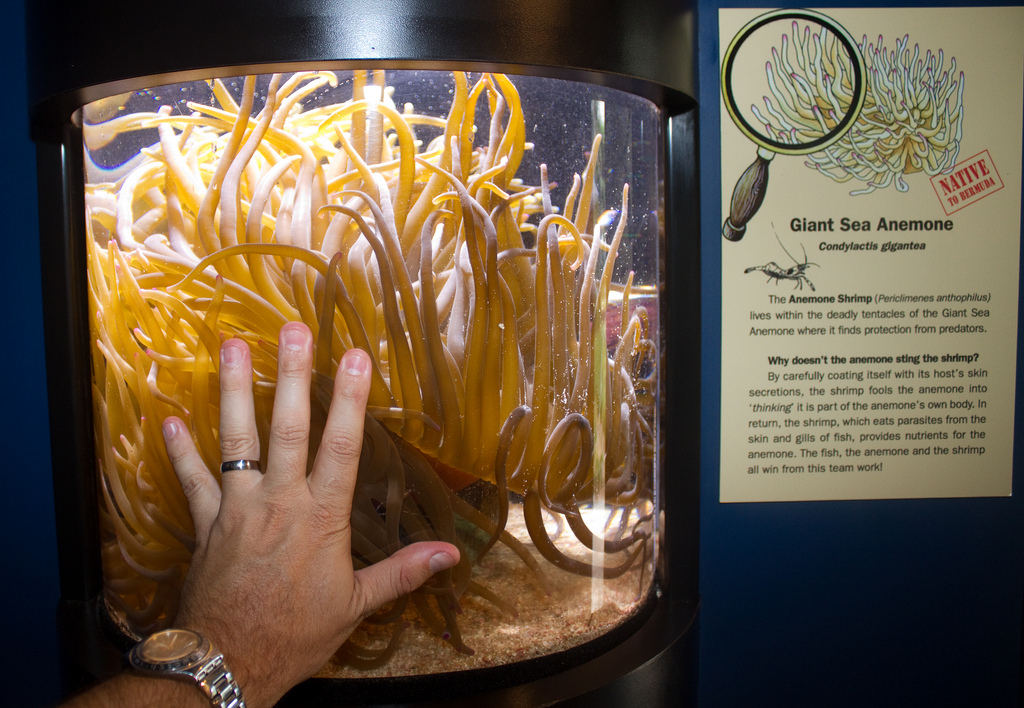
- Size comparison with human hand

Scientific classification
- Kingdom: Animalia
- Phylum: Cnidaria
- Subphylum: Anthozoa
- Class: Hexacorallia
- Order: Actiniaria
- Family: Actiniidae
- Genus: Condylactis
- Species: C. gigantea

Binomial name
- Condylactis gigantea Weinland, 1860

= Condylactis gigantea =

Species of sea anemone

Condylactis gigantea is a tropical species of ball anemone that is found in shallow reefs and other shallow inshore areas in the Caribbean Sea – more specifically the West Indies – and the western Atlantic Ocean including southern Florida through the Florida Keys. It is also commonly known as: giant Caribbean sea anemone, giant golden anemone, condylactis anemone, Haitian anemone, pink-tipped anemone, purple-tipped anemone, and Florida condy. This species can easily be seen growing in lagoons or in inner reefs as either individuals or loose groups, but never as colonies. They are often used as a model organism along with others in their genus for facultative symbiosis with monocellular algae.

== Habitat ==
The giant Caribbean sea anemone is usually found in the crevices of rock walls, attached to a rock, shell, or almost any other hard object in shallow water that experiences full-strength seawater most of the time, which may explain why the species is so common in Bermuda. Giant Caribbean sea anemones are also very common around reefs in both "forereef" and lagoon areas. It can also be found at most inshore areas, on coral reefs, though this is less common. Sea anemones in general can be found anywhere from the intertidal zone all the way to a depth of 30,000 feet.

Condylactis gigantea plays an important role in their subtidal communities by providing shelter to a variety of commensals (several fish and cleaner shrimp species), and they serve as "base stations" for fish cleaning activity.

== Reproduction ==
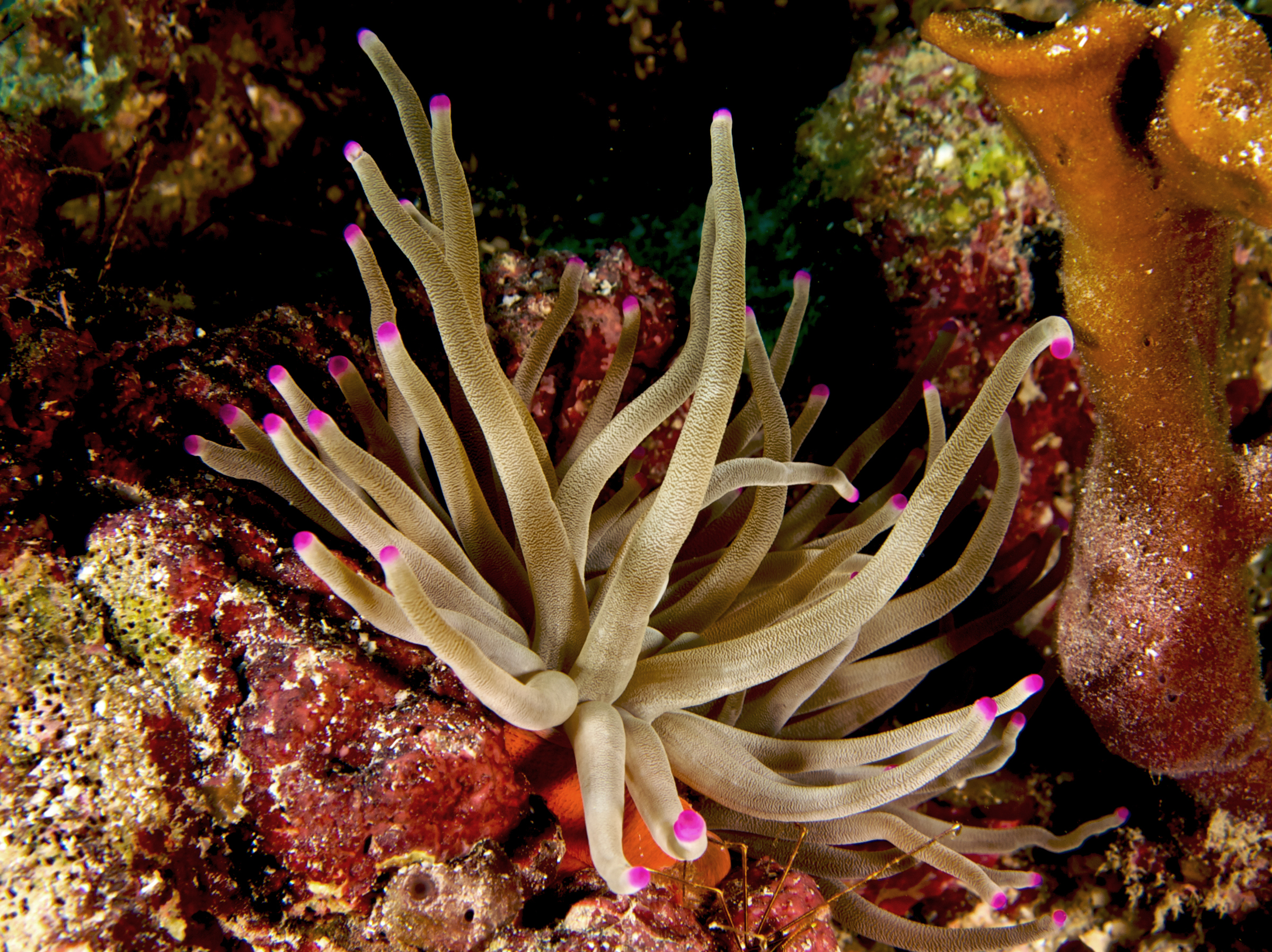
Tan and pink tipped variation

The giant Caribbean sea anemone's primary mating season is reported to be in late May; however, they may continue to reproduce at a low levels throughout the year. This anemone is generally dioecious but occasionally hermaphroditic. It has a 1:1 to sex ratio (males to females) with no evidence of brooding or of asexual reproduction or division furrowing.

The giant Caribbean sea anemone's reproduction scheme has been defined as oviparous → planktonic → lecithotrophic. The releasing or spawning of eggs and sperm are relatively synchronous with fertilization occurring externally in the water column. The success of fertilization depends upon the close proximity of separate sexed anemones. Fertilization produces a planula larva, which derives nutrients from yolk, thus larval death by starvation is unlikely, making dispersal an advantageous strategy to survival. The planula larva will settle on the benthos, develop a pedal disc, and then, eventually grow into a fully developed anemone.

== Physical appearance ==
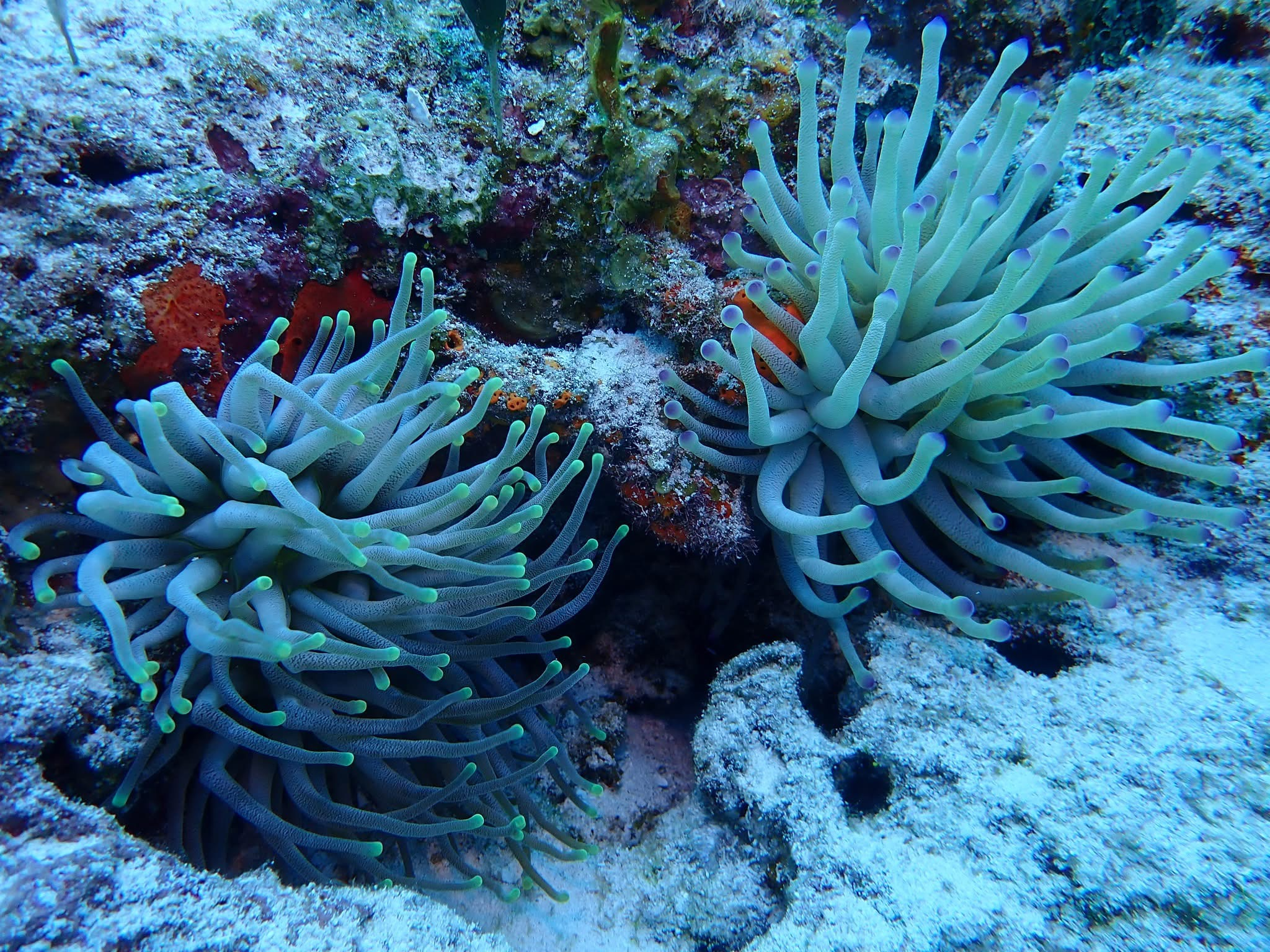
The yellow-tipped (left) and pink-tipped (right) variations off the coast of Cozumel, Mexico.

A giant Caribbean sea anemone is approximately 15 centimetres (6 in) high and 30 cm (12 in) wide, making the disc diameter approximately 40 cm (16 in) in nature. It is a large, columnar animal and can exhibit a variety of colors: white, light blue, pink, orange, pale red, or light brown. Its mouth is surrounded by 100 or more tentacles. These tentacles differ in each individual of the species and their tips may be purple or rose colored or they even may not have any change in color, becoming paler than the body itself. The whole tentacles are shades of either brown or greenish and the basal disc is firmly attached to the substrate with the only "free-floating" portion being the tentacles.

== Behavior ==
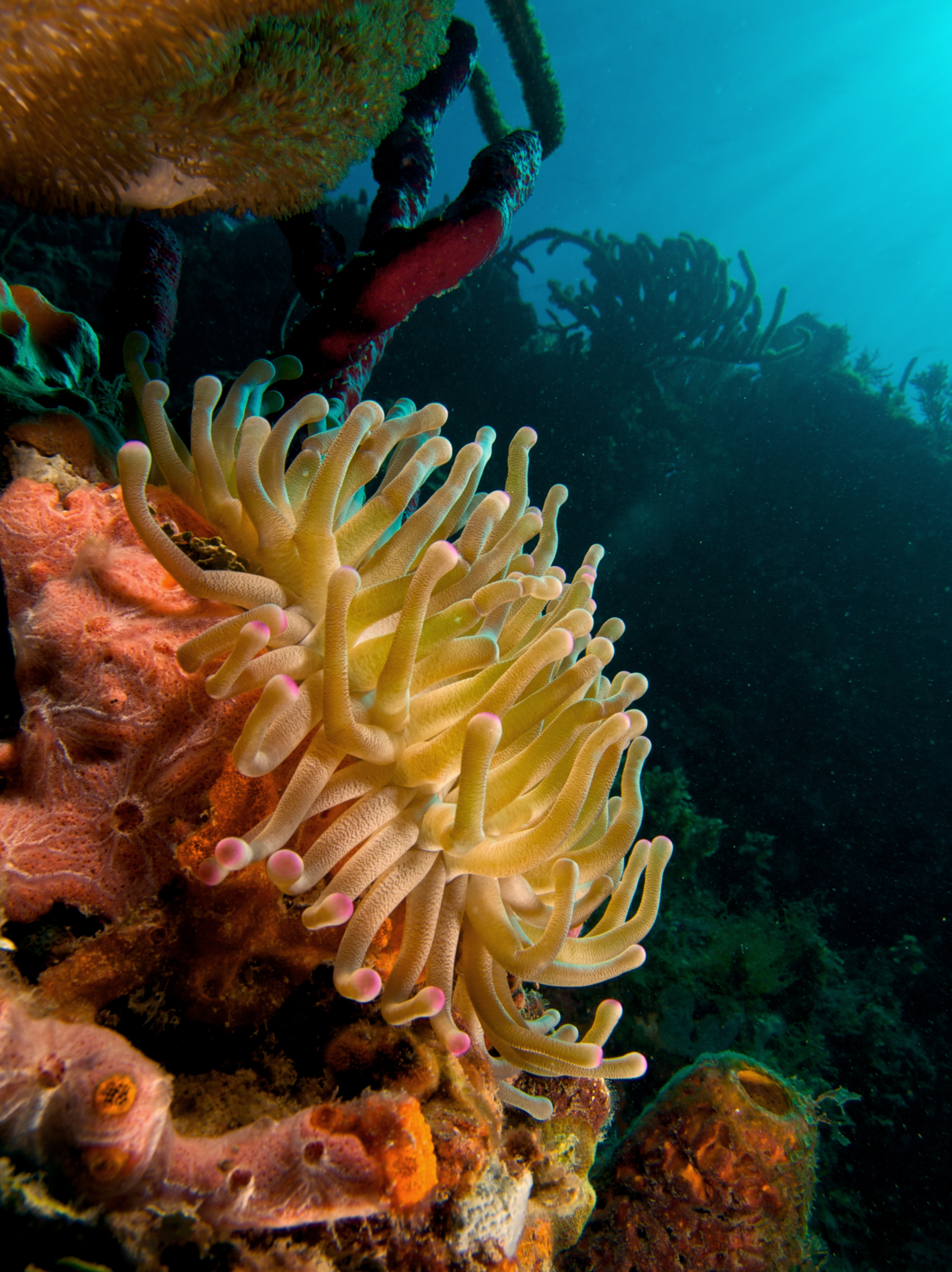
Yellow, pink tipped variation

Although the giant Caribbean sea anemone is primarily a sessile animal and has developed some mechanisms of defense and protection, it is quite a mobile species compared to other anemones, and the form of locomotion that it uses is crawling by way of its pedal disc. This movement of crawling is very slow and is not used in defense or in direct protection from predators. Giant Caribbean sea anemones instead reduce their size and draw their tentacles into their gastric cavity; their size is then reduced, and room is made in the gastric cavity by forcing most of the water out and, if their tentacles are not drawn into the gastric cavity, their volume is still reduced greatly. This approach to defense allows for the surface area of these animals to be reduced enough to create less chance of a predator attacking them.

Giant Caribbean sea anemones have another more effective defense in their nematocysts, which are their stinging cells, tubular parts of cnidarian's capsule-like cells. The tips of the giant Caribbean sea anemones’ tentacles are packed with nematocysts that contain CgNa toxin. When stimulated, the nematocysts explode out of the capsule, impaling the attacker. The toxin is then discharged, causing extreme pain and paralysis.

A giant Caribbean sea anemone is very aggressive towards other marine aquarium invertebrates, and it usually fights to conserve its own space on the ocean floor.

== Diet ==
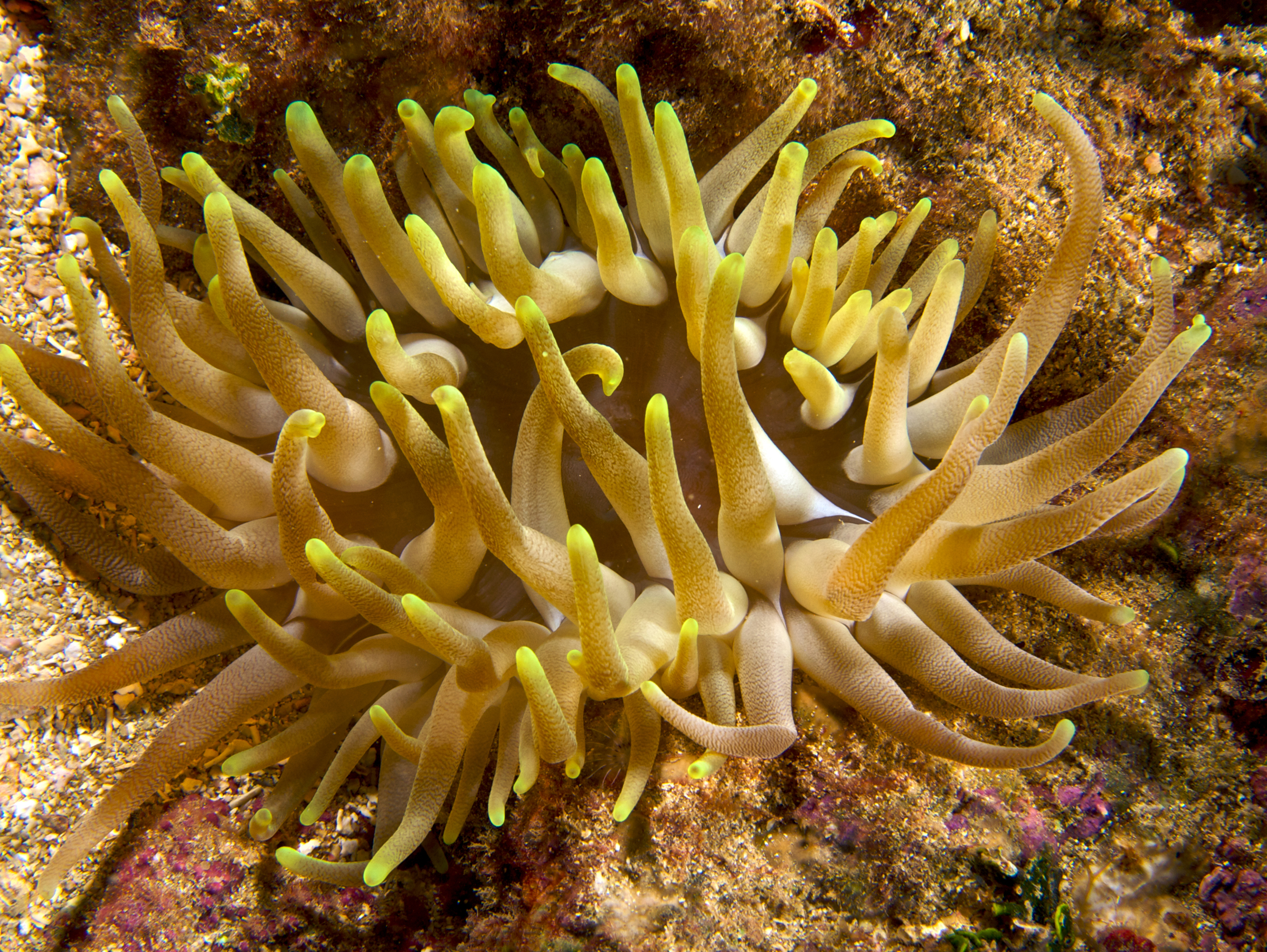
Yellow variant

The giant Caribbean sea anemone is a macrophagous carnivore and feeds upon fish, mussels, shrimp, zooplankton, and sea worms. It will not, however, go near any natural predators, such as red leg hermits, the grey sea slug, or the tompot blenny.

The anemone's nematocysts help it to capture food as well as defend against predators. Prey are quickly paralyzed by the toxin-bearing nematocysts located on the tentacles; then the prey is quickly carried to the mouth, which is opened by radial muscles in the mesenteries, and the prey is eventually swallowed whole and digested extracellularly as well as intracellularly.

== Effects on humans ==
Studies of extracted proteins suggest that this anemone's neurons contain neurofilament-like proteins that are molecularly similar to those in neurons of mammals. Studies on present-day cnidarians may shed light on the evolution of nervous systems.
