= Vesnarinone =

Chemical compound

Clinical data
- AHFS/Drugs.com: International Drug Names
- Routes of administration: By mouth
- ATC code: None

Legal status
- Legal status: In general: ℞ (Prescription only)

Identifiers
- IUPAC name: 6-[4-(3,4-Dimethoxybenzoyl)piperazin-1-yl]-3,4-dihydro-1H-quinolin-2-one
- CAS Number: 81840-15-5
- PubChem CID: 5663
- ChemSpider: 5461
- UNII: 5COW40EV8M
- ChEMBL: ChEMBL17423
- CompTox Dashboard (EPA): DTXSID80231411

Chemical and physical data
- Formula: C_{22}H_{25}N_{3}O_{4}
- Molar mass: 395.459 g·mol^{−1}
- 3D model (JSmol): Interactive image
- SMILES: COC1=C(C=C(C=C1)C(=O)N2CCN(CC2)C3=CC4=C(C=C3)NC(=O)CC4)OC
- InChI: InChI=1S/C22H25N3O4/c1-28-19-7-3-16(14-20(19)29-2)22(27)25-11-9-24(10-12-25)17-5-6-18-15(13-17)4-8-21(26)23-18/h3,5-7,13-14H,4,8-12H2,1-2H3,(H,23,26); Key:ZVNYJIZDIRKMBF-UHFFFAOYSA-N

Vesnarinone (INN) is a cardiotonic agent. A mixed phosphodiesterase 3 inhibitor and ion-channel modifier that has modest, dose-dependent, positive inotropic activity, but minimal negative chronotropic activity. Vesnarinone improves ventricular performance most in patients with the worst degree of heart failure.
