= Halcurias =

Scientific classification
- Domain: Eukaryota
- Kingdom: Animalia
- Phylum: Cnidaria
- Class: Hexacorallia
- Order: Actiniaria
- Family: Halcuriidae
- Genus: Halcurias; McMurrich, 1893

Genus of sea anemones

Halcurias is a genus of cnidarians belonging to the family Halcuriidae.

The genus has almost cosmopolitan distribution.

Species:

- Halcurias capensis Carlgren, 1928
- Halcurias carlgreni McMurrich, 1901
- Halcurias endocoelactis Stephenson, 1918
- Halcurias macmurrichi
- Halcurias mcmurrichi Uchida, 2004
- Halcurias minimus Carlgren, 1928
- Halcurias pilatus McMurrich, 1893
- Halcurias sudanensis Riemann-Zürneck, 1983
