= Anthopleurin =

Toxin in cnidarian venom

Anthopleurin is a toxin from the venom of the sea anemones Anthopleura xanthogrammica and Anthopleura elegantissima. These anemones use anthopleurin as a pheromone to quickly withdraw their tentacles in the presence of predators. Anthopleurin has four isoforms (Anthopleurin-A, -B, -C, and -Q). Their working mechanism is based on binding to sodium channels, which leads to increased excitation especially in cardiac myocytes.

== Function in sea anemones ==
Anthopleurin functions both as a toxin as well as a pheromone. When a predator approaches the anemone, their reaction is to withdraw their tentacles and oral disc. These are the preferred attack sites for predators, because the concentration of anthopleurin is the lowest in these sites. The body region of the sea-anemone that is exposed to the predator contains the highest concentration of anthopleurin. After consuming the sea-anemone, the predator travels through the water and actually helps to spread the anthopleurin. This functions as an alarm pheromone for the other anemones, so they can hide certain body parts and defend themselves.

== Sources ==
Anthopleura xanthogrammica (Giant green anemone) and Anthopleura elegantissima (Aggregating anemone) are named after the terrestrial anemone flower and are typically found along rocky, tidy shores in the Pacific Ocean.

== Molecular structure ==
Anthopleurins are water-soluble proteins. They are built of four short strands of antiparallel beta-sheets, and contain three disulfide bridges.

Isoform	Amino acids residues	Molecular weight (Dalton)	Location of disulfide bridges
Anthopleurin A	49	5138	4–46, 6–36, 29–47
Anthopleurin B	49	5274	4–46, 6–36, 29–47
Anthopleurin C	47	4884	4–44, 6–34, 27–45
Anthopleurin Q	40	4840	unknown

Isoform	Sequence	molecular formula
AP-A	GVSCLCDSDG-PSVRGNTLSG-TLWLYPSGCP SGWHNCKAHG-PTIGWCCKQ	C220H326N64O67S6
AP-B	GVPCLCDSDG-PRPRGNTLSG-ILWFYPSGCP-SGWHNCKAHG-PNIGWCCKK	C231H344N68O63S6
AP-C	GVPCLCDSDG-PSVRGNTLSG-ILWLAGCPSG-WHNCKAHGPT-IGWCCKQ	C210H316N62O61S6
AP-Q	unknown	unknown

== Mode of action ==
Anthopleurins bind to the extracellular site-3 of mammalian sodium channels. Anthopleurins can affect cardiac myocytes by binding to the cardiac isoform of the sodium channel, RT4-B. Anthopleurins slow down inactivation of the sodium channels As a result, they can have positive inotropic effects on the whole heart. Pre-treatment with AP-Q has an effect on hepatocytes in CCl_{4}-induced acute liver injury, decreasing the activity of aspartate transaminase (AST) and alanine transaminase (ALT) in the liver.

== Potency ==
All different forms of anthopleurin are potent toxins. Anthopleurin A and C show effect at concentrations of 50 nM, Anthopleurin B at 3 nM and AP-Q at 30 nM.

== Mechanism of toxin action ==
Anthopleurin can bind to the extracellular site of voltage-gated sodium channels. This results in slower inactivation, which has a positive inotropic effect on the heart. Anthopleurin has no effect on heart rate and blood pressure when given in concentrations of normal range. When the concentration of anthopleurin gets too high, arrhythmia of the heart can occur and this can cause serious damage or even death. Intoxication in humans is very rare.

== Therapeutic implications ==
=== Cardiac therapeutic implications ===
Since AP is known to have an excitatory effect on cardiac muscle contractility at very low concentrations, without interfering with heart rate and blood pressure, it has been suggested to be useful as a possible treatment for patients with heart failure. Digoxin (purified cardiac glycoside) has more side-effects and is less potent than AP (which is 200 times more potent in the case of AP-A and AP-C, while AP-B is even more potent). AP-Q is quite similar to vesnarinone, a quinolinone derivative, a medicine that can be given to patients with chronic heart failure. Only lower doses of both AP-Q and vesnarinone have beneficial effects without raising blood pressure or heart rhythm. There is a narrow dose range in which the contractility is improved but also arrhythmias could be induced. AP itself cannot be used for therapeutic admission, because the stability of the molecule after oral transmission is too low and an immunological reaction might occur since the molecule is unfamiliar to the body. However, it may be possible to modify its structure using biological engineering.

Studies have also been performed to investigate the effects of AP-Q in acute liver injury. Given in low doses (3.5–7 microgram/kg) AST and ALT are decreased, whereas high doses of AP-Q (14 microgram) increase these liver enzyme values. AP-Q also increases the delayed outward potassium current thereby increasing the outflow of potassium ions from hepatocytes. This causes a hyperpolarization of its membrane potential. This hyperpolarizing effect could lead to increased uptake of substrates that help in restoring the cellular ATP levels.
