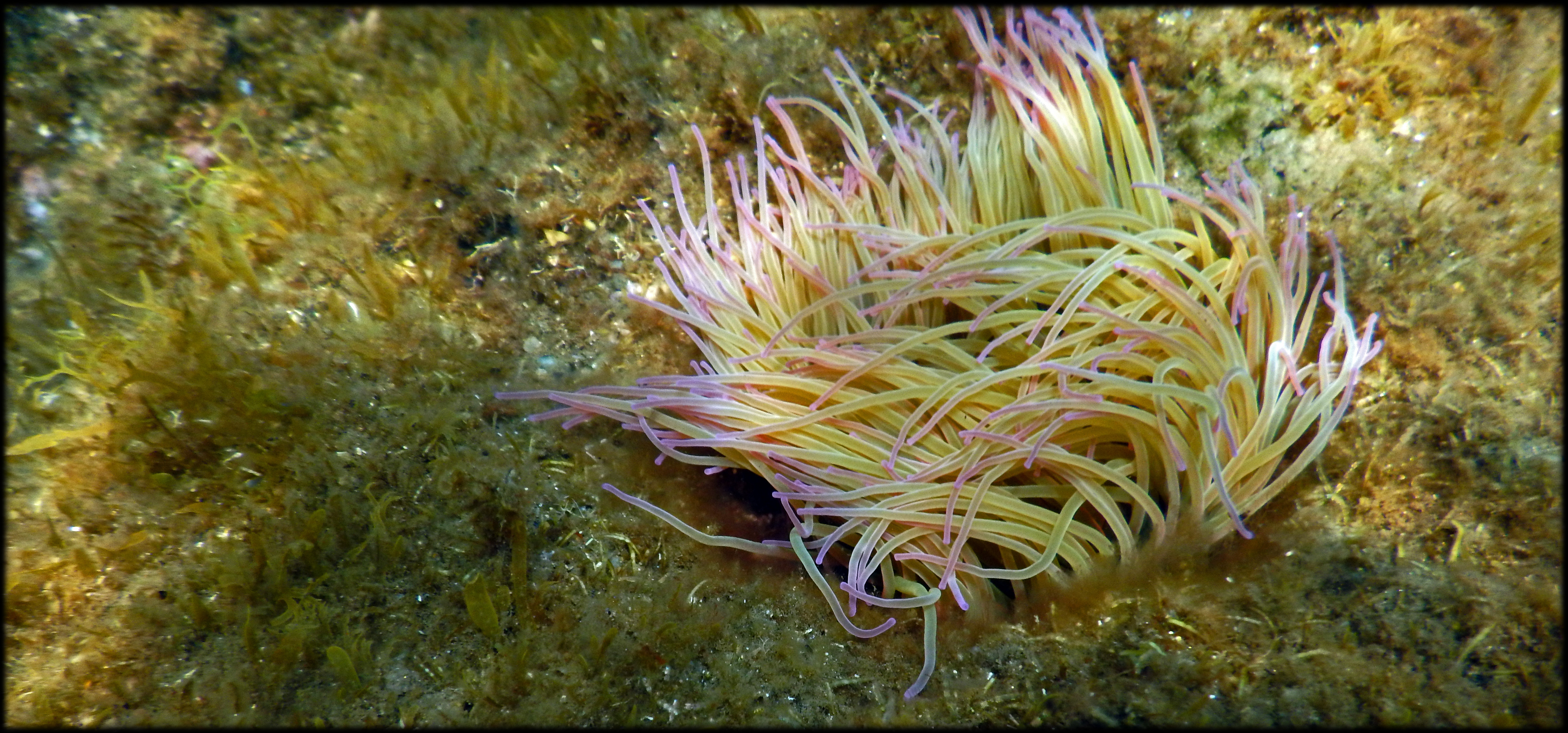
- In Argelès-sur-Mer, France

Scientific classification
- Kingdom: Animalia
- Phylum: Cnidaria
- Subphylum: Anthozoa
- Class: Hexacorallia
- Order: Actiniaria
- Family: Actiniidae
- Genus: Anemonia
- Species: A. sulcata

Binomial name
- Anemonia sulcata (Pennant, 1777)

Synonyms
- List: Actinia cereus Ellis & Solander, 1786; Actinia phaeochira (Schmarda, 1852); Actinia sulcata Pennant, 1777; Actinia viridis; Actinocereus sulcata; Actinocereus sulcatus; Anemonia aedulis Risso, 1826; Anemonia flagellifera Dons, 1945; Anemonia vagans Risso, 1826; Anenonia vagans; Anthea cereus Gærtner; Comactis viridis; Entacmaea phaeochira Schmarda, 1852

= Anemonia sulcata =

Species of sea anemone

Anemonia sulcata, or Mediterranean snakelocks sea anemone, is a species of sea anemone in the family Actiniidae from the Mediterranean Sea. Whether A. sulcata should be recognized as a synonym of A. viridis remains a matter of dispute.

== Description ==
This sea anemone has two ecotypes; one has a basal disk up to 5 cm (2 in) in diameter and has fewer than 192 tentacles (usually 142 to 148); the other has a disk up to 15 cm (6 in) in diameter and 192 tentacles or more, up to 348. The tentacles are long, slender and tapering, arranged in six whorls round the central mouth on the oral disk. They vary in colour but are usually some shade of green, grey or light brown. A knob on the tip of each tentacle, where the stinging cells are concentrated, may be violet.

== Distribution and habitat ==
This sea anemone is native to the Mediterranean Sea and the eastern Atlantic Ocean as far south as Western Sahara. It is found in the intertidal zone and the sublittoral zone, on rocky ledges, in crevices and on boulders. Ecotype 1 occurs down to about 5 m (16 ft) while ecotype 2 occurs down to about 25 m (82 ft).

== Biology ==
Anemonia sulcata has a symbiotic relationship with zooxanthellae, which inhabit the tissues and provide energy for the sea anemone. It is dioecious, with individuals becoming sexually mature when they weigh about 20 g (0.7 oz) and the basal disc measures about 22.5 mm (0.9 in) across. There are no gonads, and the germ cells develop inside the mesenteries and break through the epithelium to enter the body cavity and thence move into the water column. At this stage, the oocytes already contain symbiotic zooxanthellae. Fertilisation takes place in the sea. Breeding seems to take place throughout the year, but peaks between March and May. The sea anemones can also reproduce asexually.

This sea anemone aggressively defends its territory from other individuals which are genetically dissimilar. It extends specialised tentacles (called acrorhagi), the tips of which have a concentration of cnidocytes (stinging cells); these sting the invader, causing tissue necrosis, and making the competitor move away.

== Uses ==
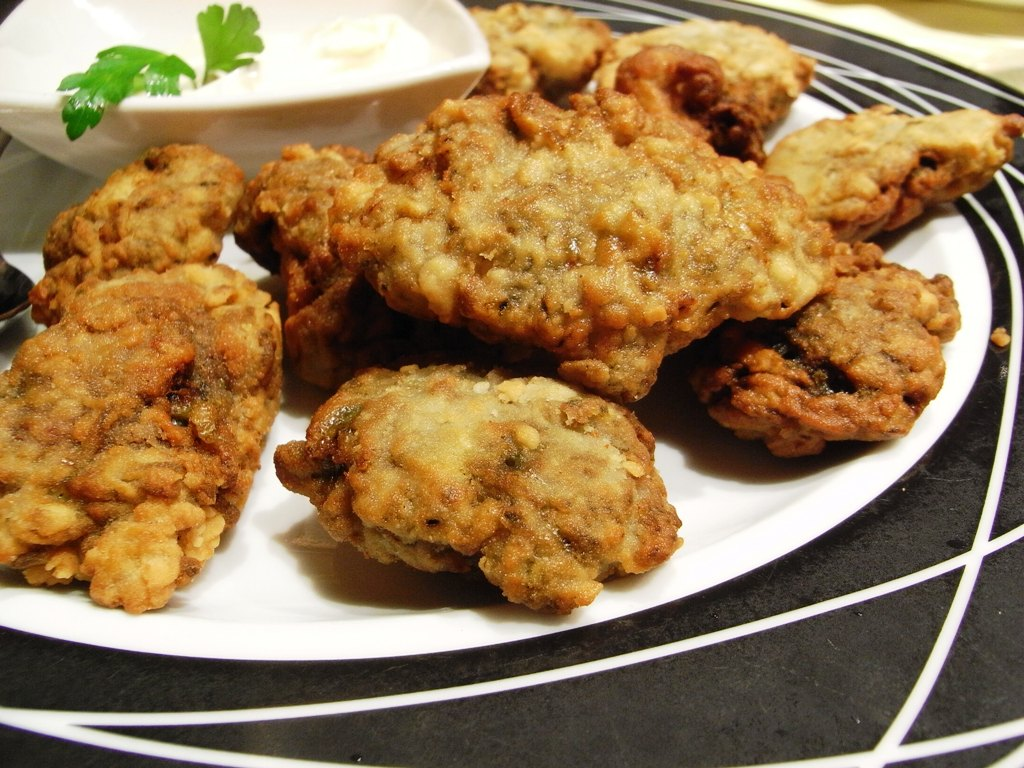
Fried ortiguillas

This sea anemone is popular as a seafood in southern Spain, specially, Cádiz, where it is known as ortiguillas, 'little nettles' or ortiga de mar, 'sea nettle'; for the fishery to be sustainable, the Andalusian authorities have set a minimum weight below which the sea anemones cannot be harvested. To neutralize the poison, the anemones are marinated in water with vinegar. The usual recipe is to batter them in flour and maybe egg and fry them in olive oil until they develop a crunchy cover. Ortiguilla omelets are also cooked.

== Toxicity ==
Anemonia sulcata have toxic cnidocysts organelles that are able to inject venom and cause an allergic reaction, particularly a skin reaction. Their stings are known to cause neurotoxicity and act on the sodium and potassium channels but also cause cytolysis on the cell membranes.

A research conducted in rabbits' ventricular myocytes were analyzed under exposure to these toxins to better understand their role. Specifically, toxin ll (ATX-II) derived from Anemonia sulcata was used in rabbit's myocytes to determine whether they induced the late sodium current causing overloading of sodium ions and consequently calcium ions inside the cell via reverse Na^{+}/Ca^{2+} exchanger current. Since the heart depends heavily on the balance of Na^{+} and Ca^{2+} homeostasis, any imbalance from this can result in heart arrhythmias. These toxins induce augmentations in diastolic Ca^{2+} concentration, calcium transient amplitude, and myocyte shortening therefore increasing serious cardiac failure and cell apoptosis.

The toxin AsKC11 is found in the venom of Anemonia sulcata. This toxin has been shown to be an activator of G protein-coupled inwardly-rectifying potassium (GIRK) channels 1/2, involved in the regulation of cellular excitability. Toxin III, known as Av3, is studied as a potential component of selective anti-insect compounds, as it is active in crustaceans and inactive in mammals, binding to receptor site-3.
