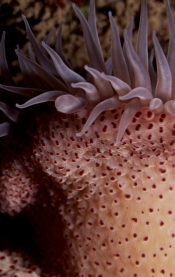
- Knobbly anemone

Scientific classification
- Kingdom: Animalia
- Phylum: Cnidaria
- Subphylum: Anthozoa
- Class: Hexacorallia
- Order: Actiniaria
- Family: Actiniidae
- Genus: Bunodosoma; Verrill, 1899

Species
- See text

= Bunodosoma =

Genus of sea anemones

Bunodosoma is a genus of sea anemones in the family Actiniidae.

== Species ==
Species in the genus include:

- Bunodosoma caissarum Corrêa in Belém, 1987
- Bunodosoma californicum Carlgren, 1951
- Bunodosoma cangicum Belém & Preslercravo, 1973
- Knobbly anemone (Bunodosoma capense (Lesson, 1830))
- Bunodosoma cavernatum (Bosc, 1802)
- Bunodosoma diadema (Drayton in Dana, 1846)
- Bunodosoma fallax (Pax, 1922)
- Bunodosoma goanense den Hartog & Vennam, 1993
- Bunodosoma grande (Verrill, 1869)
- Bunodosoma granuliferum (Le Sueur, 1817
- Bunodosoma kuekenthali Pax, 1910
- Bunodosoma sphaerulatum Duerden, 1902
- Bunodosoma zamponii Braga Gomes, Schama & Solé-Cava, 2011
