= KCNA2 =

Protein-coding gene in humans

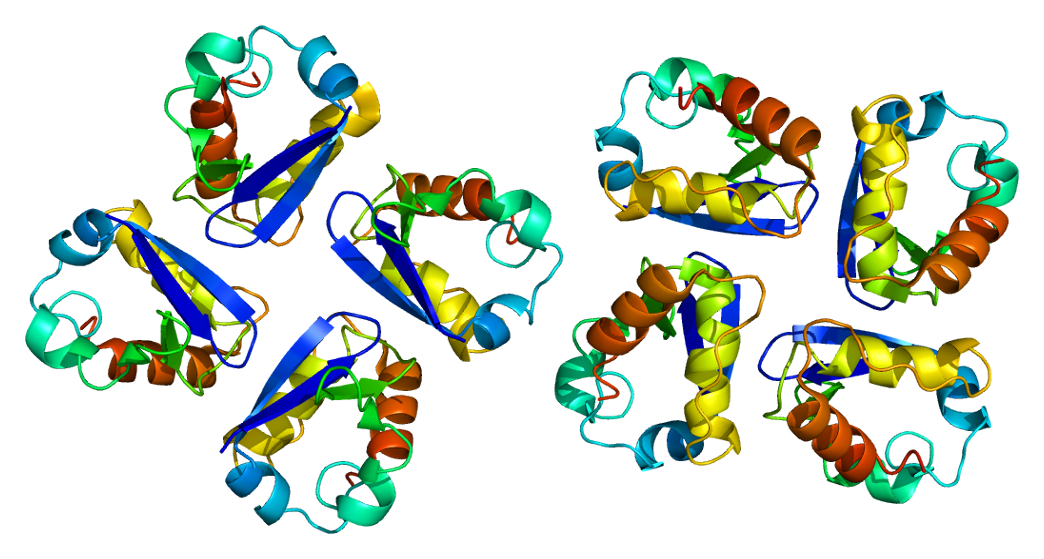

Identifiers
- Aliases: KCNA2, HBK5, HK4, HUKIV, KV1.2, MK2, NGK1, RBK2, EIEE32, potassium voltage-gated channel subfamily A member 2, DEE32
- External IDs: OMIM: 176262; MGI: 96659; GeneCards: KCNA2

Gene location (Human)
| Chr. | Chromosome 1 (human) |
| Band | 1p13.3 | Start | 110,519,837 bp |
| Band | 1p13.3 | End | 110,631,474 bp |

Gene location (Mouse)
| Chr. | Chromosome 3 (mouse) |
| Band | 3 F2.3|3 46.61 cM | Start | 107,008,462 bp |
| Band | 3 F2.3|3 46.61 cM | End | 107,022,321 bp |
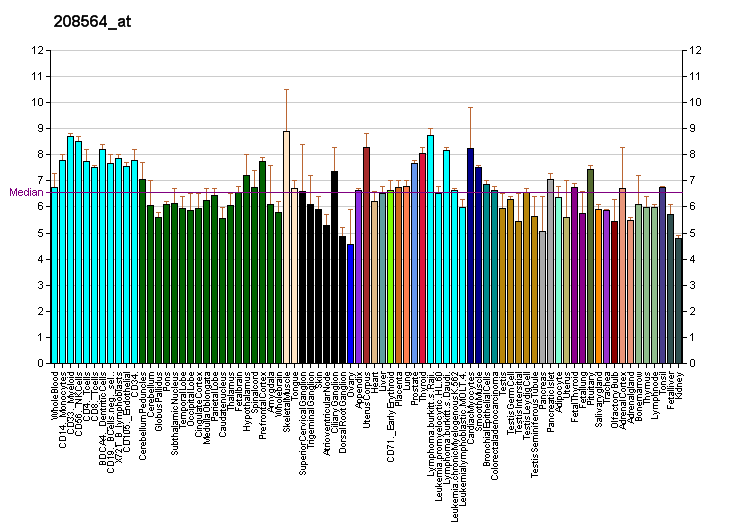
RNA expression pattern
| Bgee | Human / Mouse (ortholog); Top expressed in: Brodmann area 23; middle temporal gyrus; lateral nuclear group of thalamus; postcentral gyrus; primary visual cortex; cerebellar vermis; superior frontal gyrus; pons; Brodmann area 46; endothelial cell / Top expressed in: lateral geniculate nucleus; pontine nuclei; lobe of cerebellum; medial geniculate nucleus; anterior horn of spinal cord; medial vestibular nucleus; medial dorsal nucleus; deep cerebellar nuclei; cerebellar vermis; facial motor nucleus; More reference expression data |
| BioGPS | More reference expression data |
Gene ontology
| Molecular function | potassium channel activity; voltage-gated ion channel activity; ion channel activity; protein binding; voltage-gated potassium channel activity; delayed rectifier potassium channel activity; outward rectifier potassium channel activity; kinesin binding |
| Cellular component | juxtaparanode region of axon; axon terminus; integral component of membrane; perikaryon; cell projection; endoplasmic reticulum membrane; membrane; voltage-gated potassium channel complex; plasma membrane; synapse; integral component of plasma membrane; neuronal cell body membrane; axon; cell junction; dendrite; endoplasmic reticulum; neuron projection; lamellipodium membrane; presynaptic membrane; lamellipodium; potassium channel complex; paranodal junction; calyx of Held; integral component of presynaptic membrane |
| Biological process | regulation of dopamine secretion; regulation of ion transmembrane transport; ion transport; optic nerve structural organization; potassium ion transport; transmembrane transport; potassium ion transmembrane transport; regulation of circadian sleep/wake cycle, non-REM sleep; protein homooligomerization; protein complex oligomerization; sensory perception of pain; neuronal action potential |
Sources:Amigo / QuickGO
Orthologs
| Databases | NCBI: entry; OMA: entry |
| Species | Human | Mouse |
| Entrez | 3737 | 16490 |
| Ensembl | ENSG00000177301 | ENSMUSG00000040724 |
| UniProt | P16389 | P63141 |
| RefSeq (mRNA) | NM_001204269; NM_004974 | NM_008417 |
| RefSeq (protein) | NP_001191198; NP_004965 | NP_032443 |
| Location (UCSC) | Chr 1: 110.52 – 110.63 Mb | Chr 3: 107.01 – 107.02 Mb |
| PubMed search |
- Wikidata
| View/Edit Human | View/Edit Mouse |

Potassium voltage-gated channel subfamily A member 2 also known as K_{v}1.2 is a protein that in humans is encoded by the KCNA2 gene.

== Function ==
Potassium channels represent the most complex class of voltage-gated ion channels from both functional and structural standpoints. Their diverse functions include regulating neurotransmitter release, heart rate, insulin secretion, neuronal excitability, epithelial electrolyte transport, smooth muscle contraction, and cell volume. Four sequence-related potassium channel genes - shaker, shaw, shab, and shal - have been identified in Drosophila, and each has been shown to have human homolog(s). This gene encodes a member of the potassium channel, voltage-gated, shaker-related subfamily. This member contains six membrane-spanning domains with a shaker-type repeat in the fourth segment. It belongs to the delayed rectifier class, members of which allow nerve cells to efficiently repolarize following an action potential. The coding region of this gene is intronless, and the gene is clustered with genes KCNA3 and KCNA10 on chromosome 1.

== Interactions ==
KCNA2 has been shown to interact with KCNA4, DLG4, PTPRA, KCNAB2, RHOA and Cortactin.

== Clinical significance ==
Mutations in this gene cause KCNA2-related disorders. These can include epilepsy, intellectual and developmental disabilities, movement disorders, autism spectrum disorder, attention deficit hyperactivity disorder, and hereditary spastic paraplegia.

== See also ==
- Voltage-gated potassium channel
- Pandinotoxin
