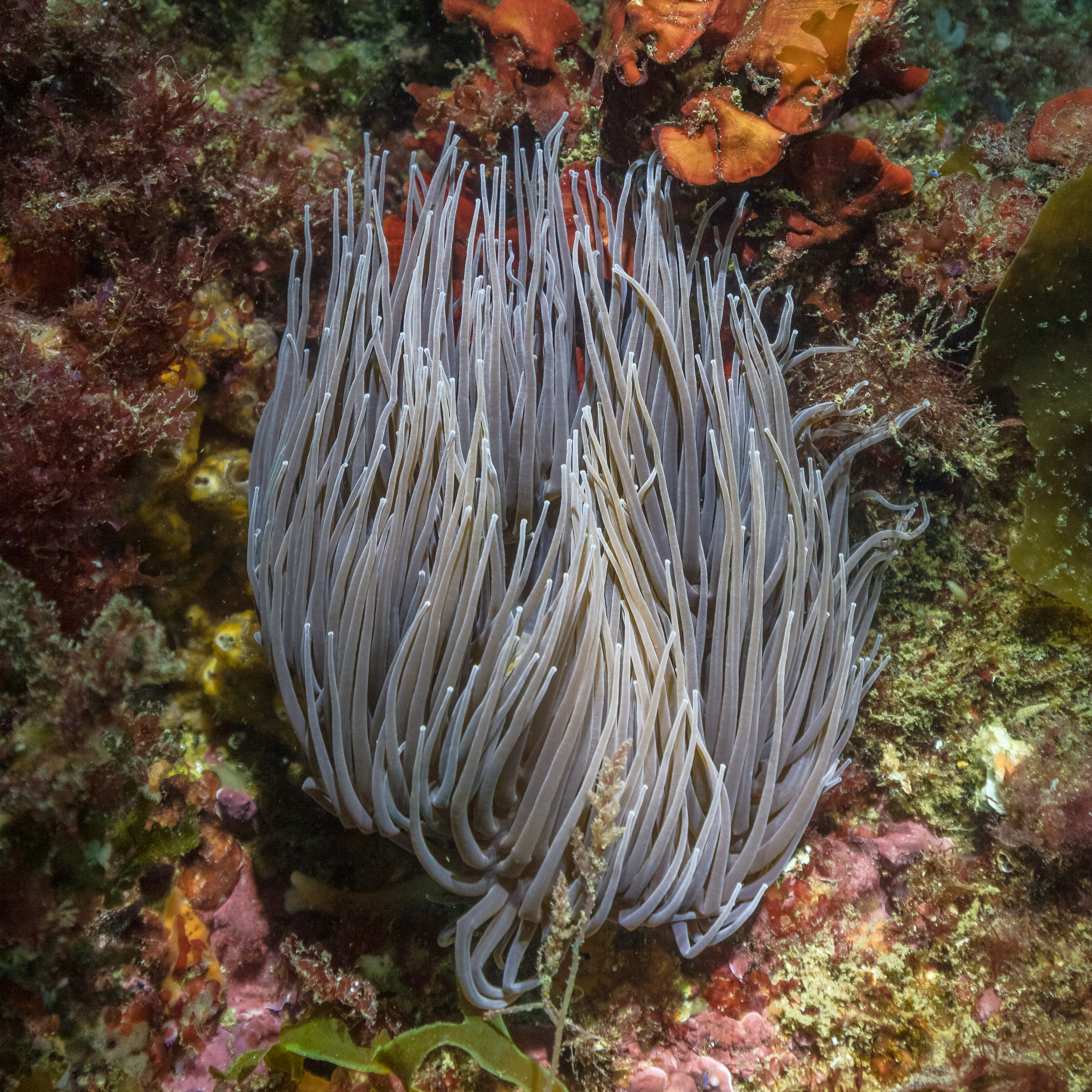
- In Arrábida Natural Park, Portugal

Conservation status
- Least Concern (IUCN 3.1) (Mediterranean)

Scientific classification
- Kingdom: Animalia
- Phylum: Cnidaria
- Subphylum: Anthozoa
- Class: Hexacorallia
- Order: Actiniaria
- Family: Actiniidae
- Genus: Anemonia
- Species: A. viridis

Binomial name
- Anemonia viridis Forskål, 1775

Synonyms
- Actinia viridis Gmelin; Anemonia sulcata viridis Andres, 1881; Priapus viridis Forsskål, 1775

= Snakelocks anemone =

Species of sea anemone

The snakelocks anemone (Anemonia viridis) is a sea anemone found in the eastern Atlantic Ocean and the Mediterranean Sea. The latter population is however sometimes considered a separate species, the Mediterranean snakelocks anemone (A. sulcata).

The tentacles are usually a deep green color with purple tips. The green color is often attributed to the presence of symbiotic algae within the tentacles but is the result of the presence of green fluorescent protein which is present in corals, sea anemones, and some other cnidarians. The anemone tissue contains a symbiotic algae called zooxanthellae, which is necessary for the long-term survival of the sea anemone. When the numbers of algae diminish the anemone may appear dull grey. The algae need light to flourish, so snakelock anemones will be found in the sunniest pools. On average the snakelocks anemone is 8 cm wide.

== Reproduction ==
Unlike other cnidarians, anemones (and other Anthozoa) entirely lack the free-swimming medusa stage of the life cycle; the polyp produces eggs and sperm, and the fertilized egg develops into a planula that develops directly into another polyp.

== Ecology ==
Several species of small animals regularly live in a symbiotic or commensal relationship with the snakelocks anemone, gaining protection from predators by residing among the venomous tentacles. These include the incognito (or anemone) goby (Gobius incognitus), the shrimp Periclimenes aegylios and the Leach's spider crab (Inachus phalangium).

== Human uses ==
This species is widely consumed in southwestern Spain, in the Gulf of Cádiz region, as ortiguillas de mar (literally, "little sea nettles", because it has urticant properties before it is cooked), or simply ortiguillas. The whole animal is marinated in vinegar, coated in a tempura-like batter, and deep-fried in olive oil. Ortiguillas are offered in some coastal Andalusian restaurants as a delicacy. They are similar in appearance and texture to croquettes but have a strong seafood taste. This anemone is also consumed in Sardinia, where it is deep fried in olive oil and known as triads.

It is becoming a popular aquarium pet, especially in Europe, and readily adapts to aquaria.

== Gallery ==
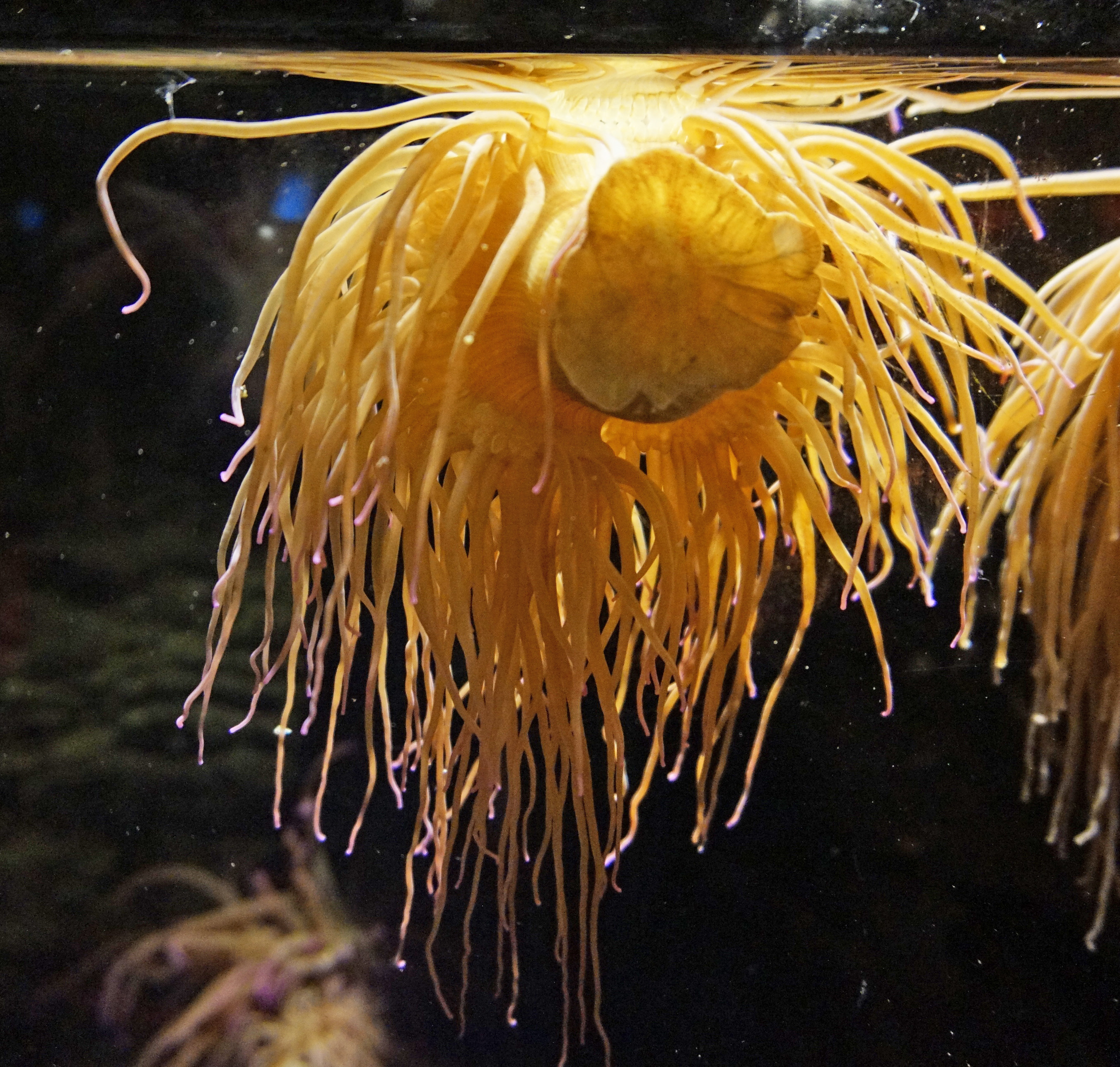
Anemone viridis in aquarium of Genoa

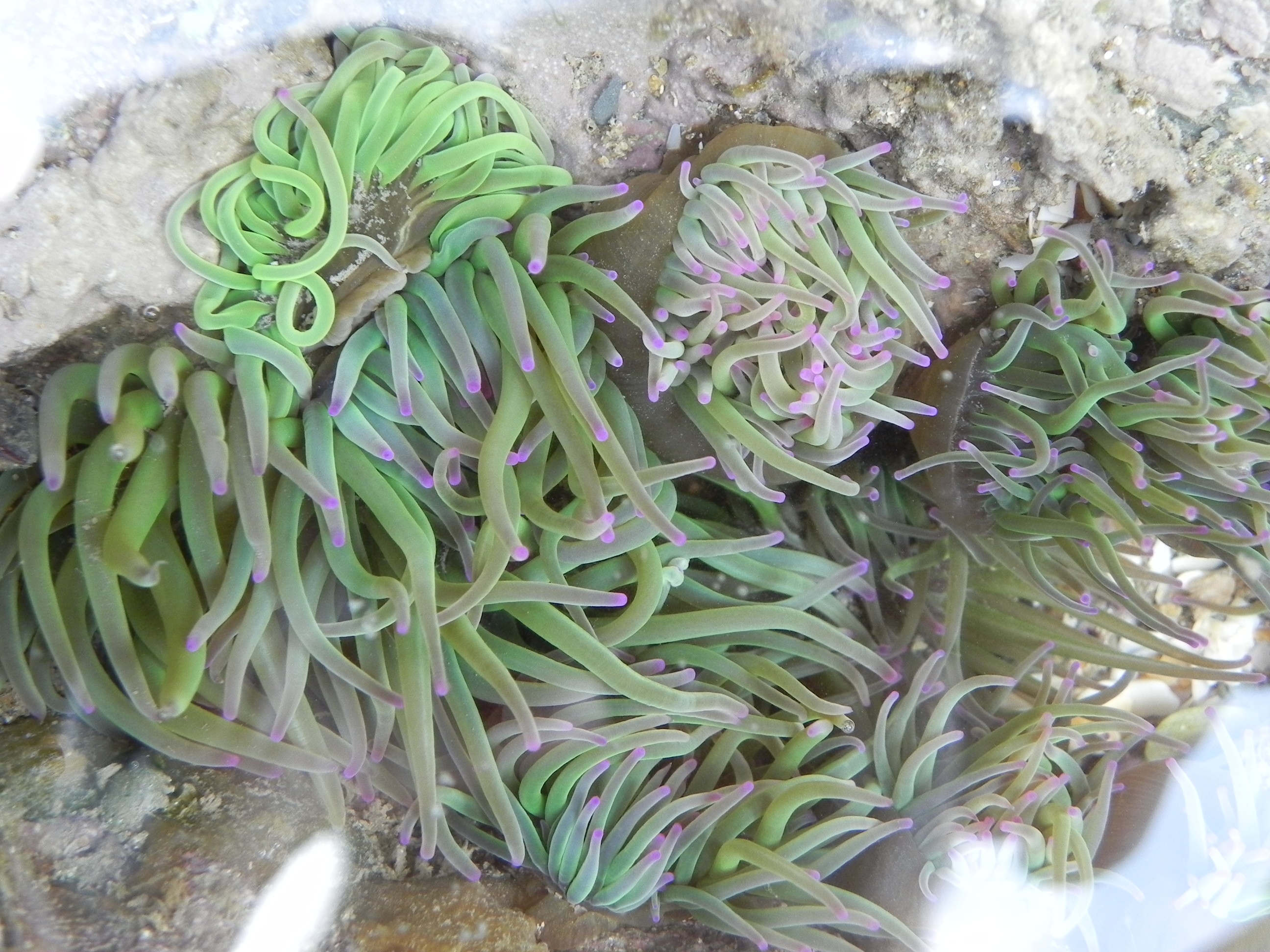
A colony in North Devon, UK

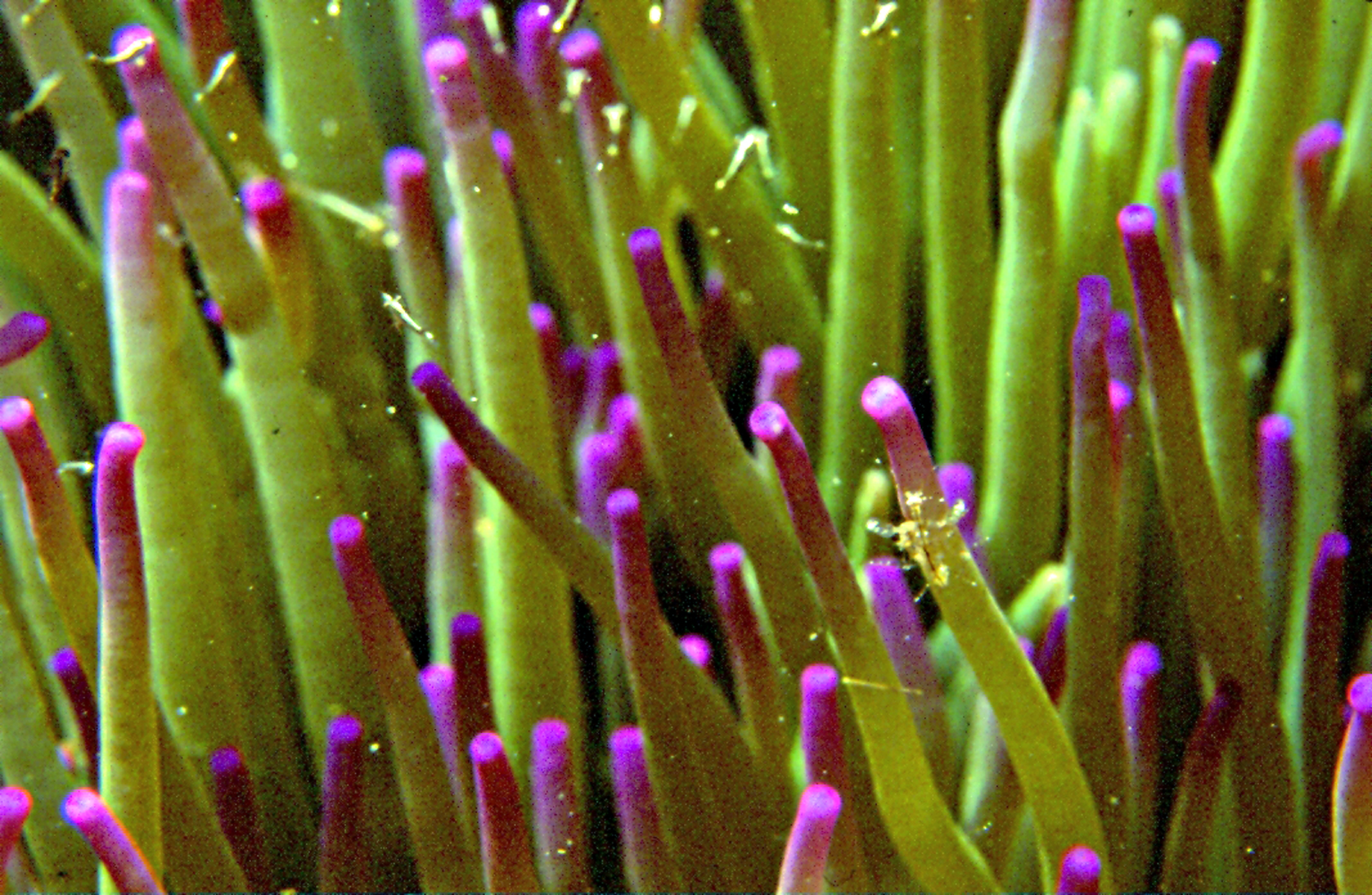
Tentacles

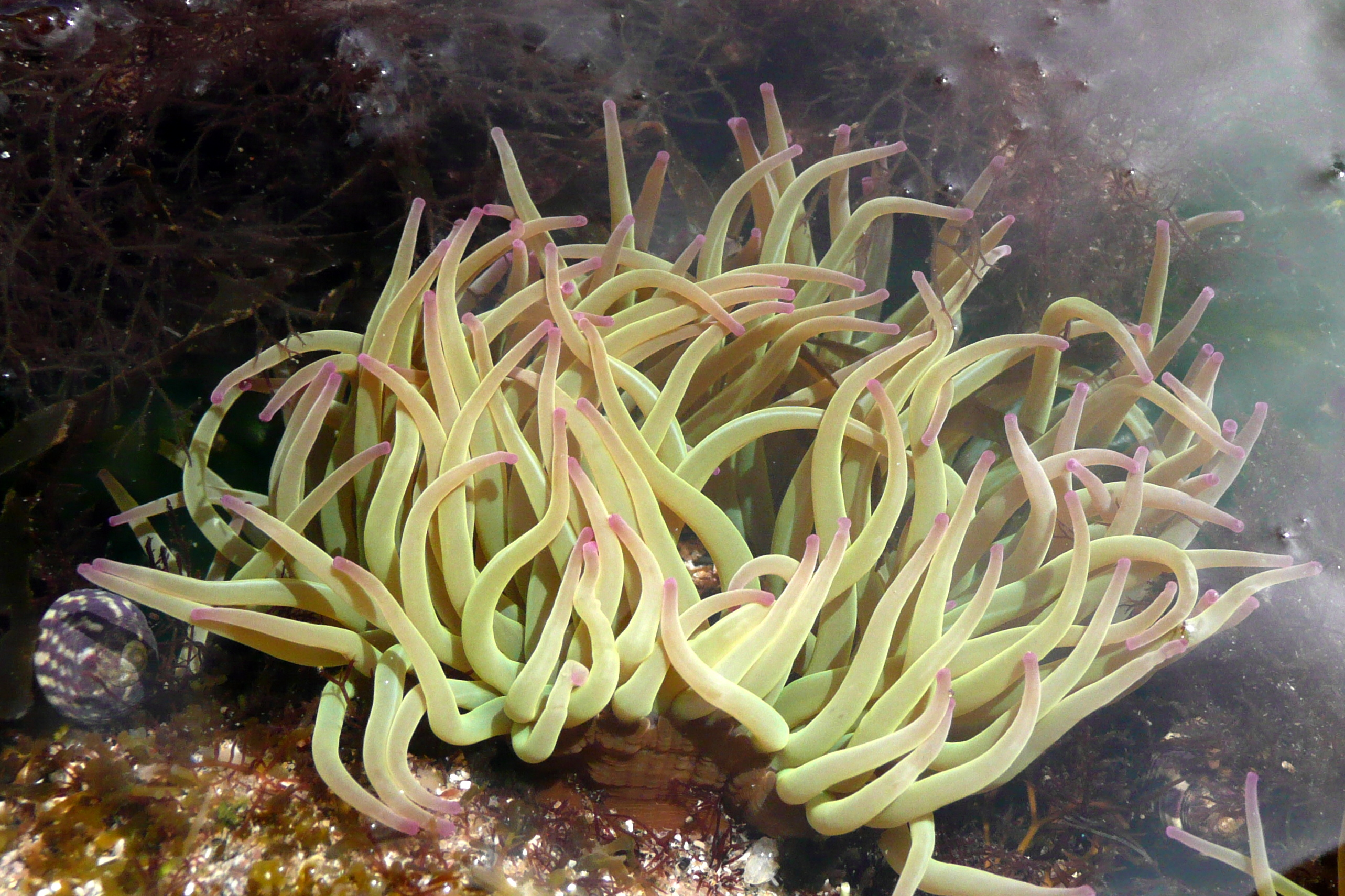
In France

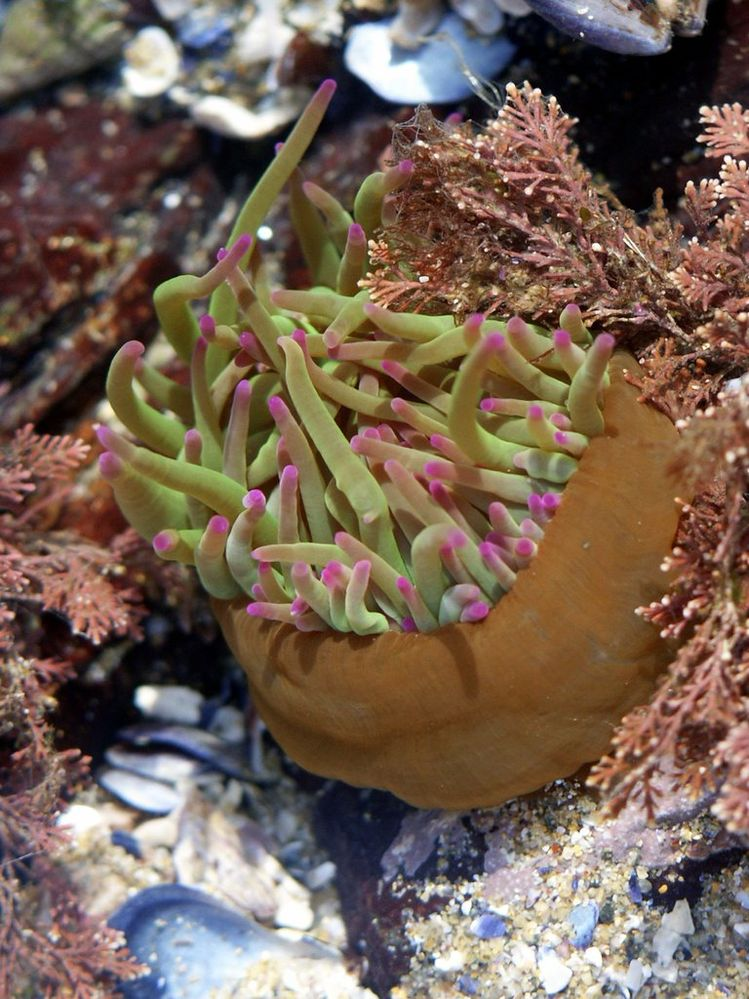
In France

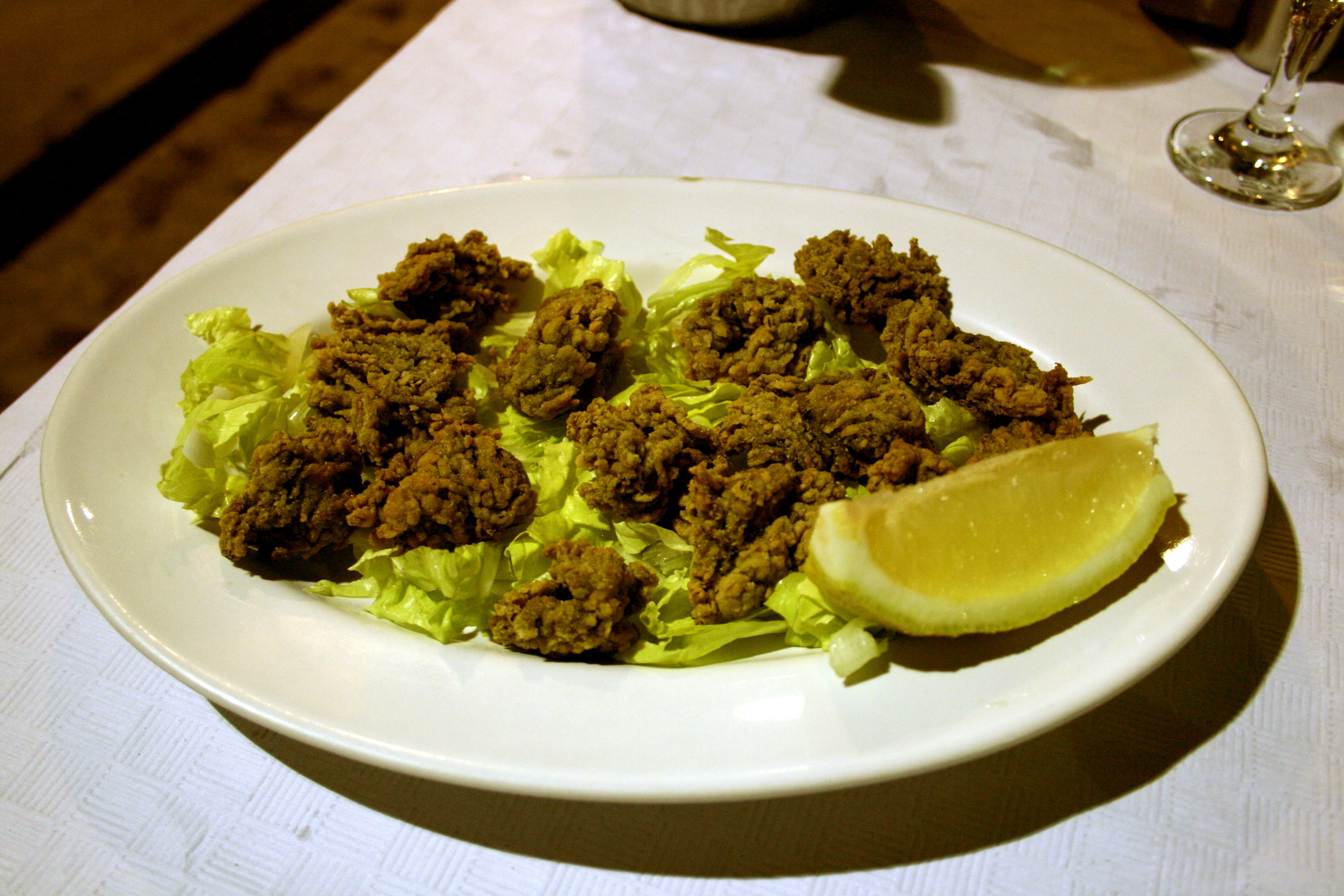
Ortiguillas plate in Cádiz
