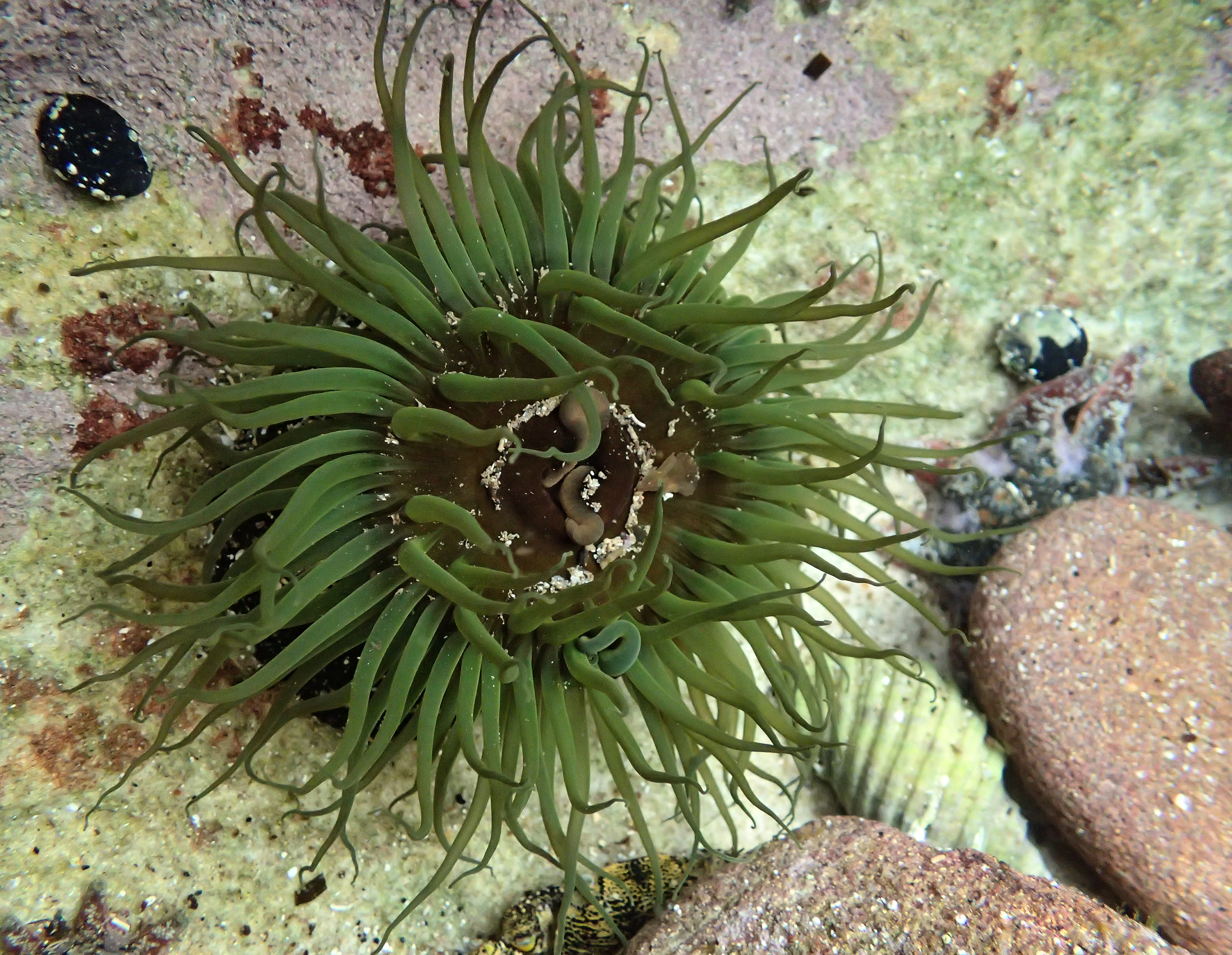

Scientific classification
- Kingdom: Animalia
- Phylum: Cnidaria
- Subphylum: Anthozoa
- Class: Hexacorallia
- Order: Actiniaria
- Family: Actiniidae
- Genus: Aulactinia
- Species: A. veratra

Binomial name
- Aulactinia veratra (Drayton in Dana, 1846)

Synonyms
- Actinia veratra Drayton in Dana, 1846; Bunodactis verruculata (Lager, 1911); Cnidopus verater (Drayton in Dana, 1846); Cnidopus veratra (Drayton in Dana, 1846); Cribrina verruculata Lager, 1911; Phymactis veratra (Drayton in Dana, 1846)

= Aulactinia veratra =

Species of sea anemone

Aulactinia veratra, the green snakelock anemone, is a species of sea anemone in the family Actiniidae. It is native to the southeastern Indian Ocean and the southwestern Pacific Ocean.

== Description ==
The green snakelock anemone averages about 20 mm (0.8 in) in height, but individuals in some areas have reached 60 mm (2.4 in) when fully extended. The broad column has rows of verrucae (wart-like outgrowths) on its surface to which coarse grains of sand and fragments of shell adhere. The oral disc has a central mouth surrounded by a whorl of long, tapering tentacles with blunt tips, varying in number from 24 to 124. When expanded, both the column and tentacles of this anemone are usually green, but brown or red individuals sometimes occur. When retracted, with the oral disc and tentacles tucked inside the body cavity, green individuals may appear black.

== Distribution and habitat ==
The green snakelock anemone is found in shallow seas around the west, south, and east coasts of Australia, Tasmania and both islands of New Zealand. It is found in the intertidal zone in rock pools, under overhangs, between boulders, and in crevices. The base is firmly attached to a rocky substrate even when the anemone is in a rock pool and appears to be immersed in sand. It is often found growing close to the sand anemone.
