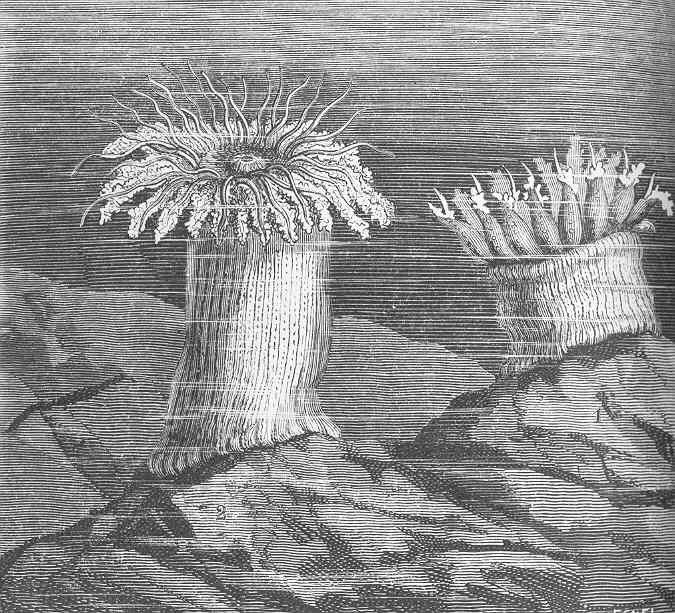
- Phyllactis praetexta (Dana)

Scientific classification
- Domain: Eukaryota
- Kingdom: Animalia
- Phylum: Cnidaria
- Subphylum: Anthozoa
- Class: Hexacorallia
- Order: Actiniaria
- Family: Actiniidae
- Genus: Phyllactis; Milne Edwards & Haime, 1851

= Phyllactis =

Genus of sea anemones

Phyllactis is a genus of cnidarians belonging to the family Actiniidae. In 2024, Phyllactis was synonymized with Actinostella.

The species of this genus are found in America.

Species:

- Phyllactis cichoracea Milne-Edwards, 1876
- Phyllactis conquilega (Duchassaing & Michelotti, 1860)
- Phyllactis formosa (Duchassaing, 1850)
- Phyllactis plicata
- Phyllactis praetexta (Couthouy, 1846)
