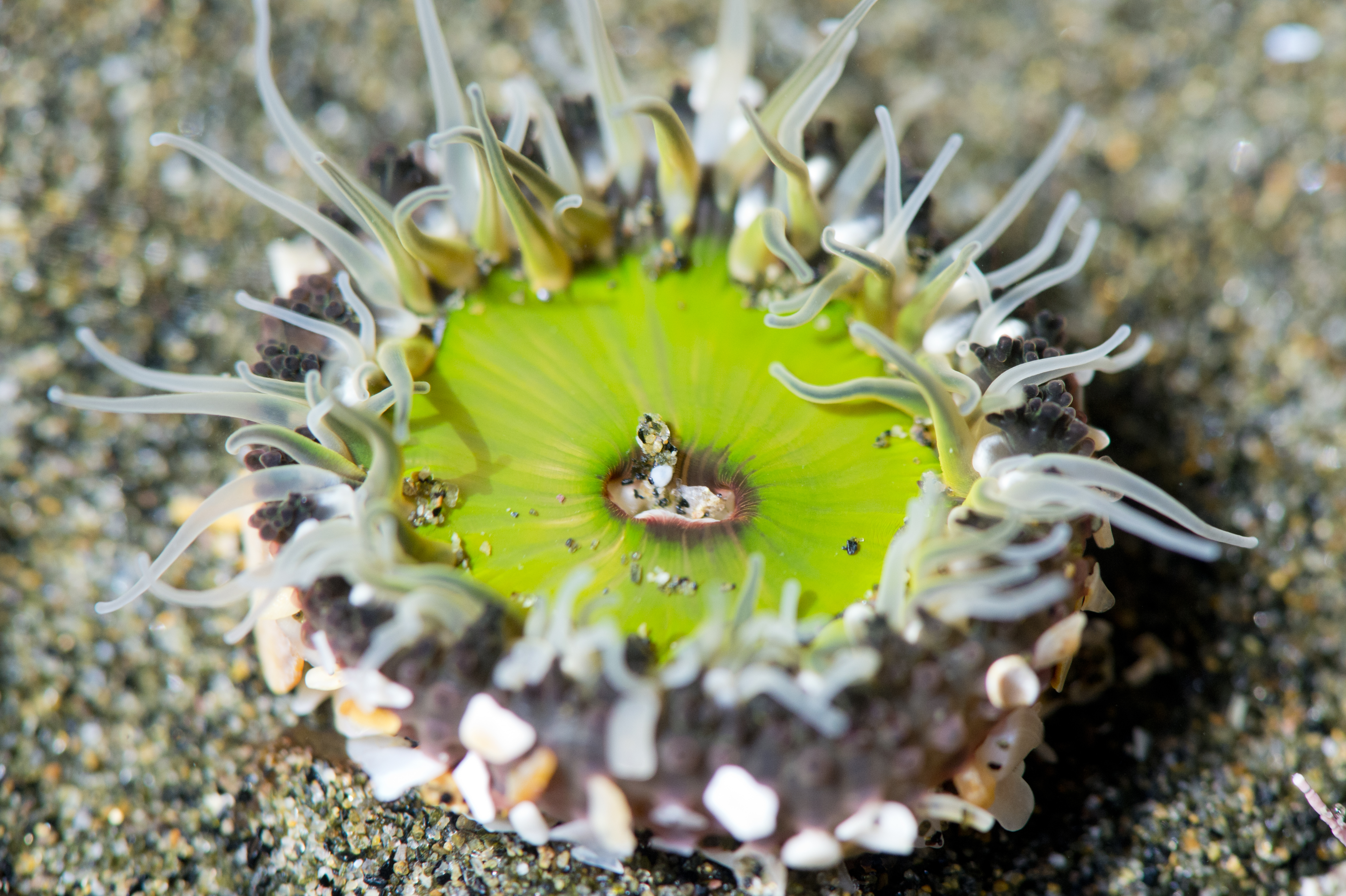

Scientific classification
- Domain: Eukaryota
- Kingdom: Animalia
- Phylum: Cnidaria
- Subphylum: Anthozoa
- Class: Hexacorallia
- Order: Actiniaria
- Family: Actiniidae
- Genus: Oulactis
- Species: O. magna

Binomial name
- Oulactis magna (Stuckey, 1909)

= Oulactis magna =

Species of sea anemone

Oulactis magna, commonly known as the giant shore anemone or camouflaged anemone, and by its Māori name kōtore tino nui, is a common sea anemone found in New Zealand.

It is usually found in the mid to low tidal zone of exposed beaches living in tidal pools or between rocks where there is sand. Its body is usually encrusted in sand with only its tentacles exposed. It sometimes attaches pieces of shell and other debris to its stalk, a strategy that is thought to reduce erosion.

The giant shore anemone has no known predators but is parasitised by the gastropod Epitonium (Hyaloscala) jukesianum, which uses its modified radula to pierce the anemone and suck out bodily fluids.

== Description ==
This large anemone has a diameter of between 10 and 12 centimetres.

It is best known for its vibrant colours and its central disc area can be green, pink, blue, or brown. Its tentacles are usually a different colour to the central disc and can be blue, mauve, orange or white.

When underwater it extends up to 190 short blunt tentacles. These have perforated tips that resemble warts and eject fine streams of water when the animal is stimulated. Tentacles are arranged in four or more whorls which are all of the same length.

== Diet ==
Giant shore anemones feed on shrimp, small fish and small crabs, which they capture using stinging cells on their tentacles to paralyse prey. Once caught, they will suck prey into their central cavity to be broken down by digestive enzymes. Shells and other items that are indigestible will be expelled back through the central opening.
