= Paranemonia vouliagmeniensis =

Conservation status
- Endangered (IUCN 3.1)

Scientific classification
- Kingdom: Animalia
- Phylum: Cnidaria
- Subphylum: Anthozoa
- Class: Hexacorallia
- Order: Actiniaria
- Family: Actiniidae
- Genus: Paranemonia
- Species: P. vouliagmeniensis

Binomial name
- Paranemonia vouliagmeniensis Doumenc, England & Chintiroglou, 1987

Species of sea anemone

Paranemonia vouliagmeniensis, or Greek anemone, is an endangered sea anemone that occurs only in Lake Vouliagmeni, Athens. The lake's status as a spa has contributed negatively to the species' livelihood and population; while no formal population monitoring has taken place, it has been estimated that the population has decreased by over 50% from 2007-2017. Paranemonia vouliagmeniensis has large embryos that can be found in the tentacles, unlike other species in the same genus. It also has a greater size range than other sea anemone.
