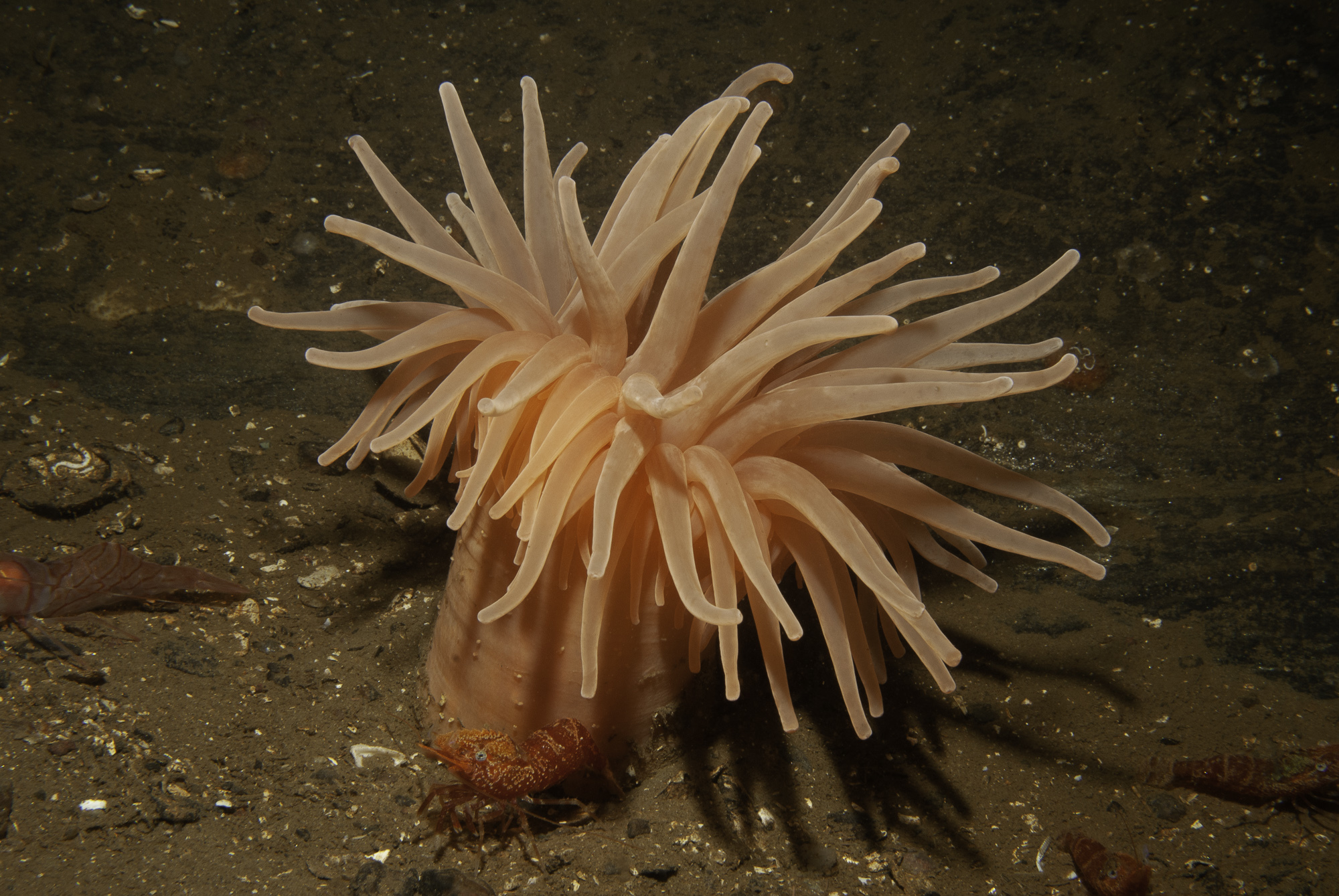
- Deeplet sea anemone

Scientific classification
- Domain: Eukaryota
- Kingdom: Animalia
- Phylum: Cnidaria
- Subphylum: Anthozoa
- Class: Hexacorallia
- Order: Actiniaria
- Family: Actiniidae
- Genus: Bolocera
- Species: B. tuediae

Binomial name
- Bolocera tuediae Johnston, 1832

Synonyms
- List: Actinia tuediae Johnston, 1832; Anemonia tuedia; Anemonia tuediae Milne Edwards, 1857; Anthea tuediae (Johnston, 1832); Bolocera longicornis Carlgren, 1891; Bolocera tudiae; Bolocera tuedia

= Bolocera tuediae =

Species of sea anemone

Bolocera tuediae, commonly known as the deeplet sea anemone, is a sea anemone found in the sublittoral zone of the North Sea. It was first discovered near Bewick, England by Johnston in 1832. It is distinguished by its large, hexamerous size and shedding of tentacles. The nematocysts of the anemone can have dangerous effects, including the rupturing of human blood cells. The deeplet sea anemone was observed to have a symbiotic relationship with shrimp, as they cluster around its base in both temperate and Northwest Atlantic waters.

== Habitat ==
The anemone is found from depths of 20 m to 2000 m in the sublittoral zone. It is found in closed off marine areas attached to hard substances such as stones, rocks, and shells. Normally it is found in the North Atlantic to the Arctic Circle and North America. It has been found recently in Scottish sea lochs. It is commonly found in the bathyal zone of the Laurentian channel in the area between Anticosti Island and Newfoundland, including all of the Strait of Belle Isle except for the upper 50 meters near Newfoundland. Also, it is present on all British and Irish coasts, but is harder to find on southern coasts, and able to dominate the Beryl oil platform.

== Characteristics ==
In 1860, Philip Henry Gosse expanded on Johnston's initial discovery of the anemone in 1832 and reported its physical description as having a pillar-like column, a smooth disc and surface, and short and thick tentacles. Its stomach is able to extend and change shape. As part of the genus Bolocera, the anemone has a developed muscle ring as the base of each tentacle but its column doesn't have an outer muscular layer. Bolocera tuediae usually ranges from a brown to dull pink color. It is normally smooth and soft and its height varies, but it can grow up to 30 cm wide and develop up to 200 tentacles. Occasionally, the disc can have signs of a dark pattern around the base of the tentacles, but is distinguished from other similar species since it doesn't have a colored pattern on its disc. The tentacles are hexamerous, as they are organized in groups of rings where the first group has six tentacles, the next has twelve, and the next has twenty-four rings, etc. Its column, where its body is located, is featureless. It is able to shed its tentacles by pinching them off, so it has a grooved base for this purpose. It is distinguished by its large size compared to other sea anemones. Although it is similar to the white-spotted rose anemone (Urticina eques), it is separated by the fact that it has no pattern on its disc, its tentacles are arranged in patterns of six instead of ten, and it doesn't have warts on its column.

== Reproduction ==
The deeplet sea anemones have their largest gonads (sex glands) in late winter. The females have pink, spherical eggs with a membrane, and are large compared to other anemones. When its nucleus is fertilized, it will make several daughter nuclei. Each nuclei will spread until they are evenly distributed. As the eggs mature they will begin to go through segmentation (becoming covered with rounded masses or segments). The egg will grow and a membrane will form before taking on a more spherical shape. Next, they will go through gastrulation, where they develop multiple layers. The wall of the blastula will flatten and sink downwards, and the egg will often flatten itself again, becoming the gastrula made up of three layers. Cilia first appear during the middle blastula stage, followed by eight membranes inside the body. About twenty-five days after the eggs have been shed, fixation will occur. The base will form the shape of a disc and grow, the mouth opens, the larva shorten, and finally the anemones become largely dormant.

== Defense ==
The deeplet sea anemone has many types of nematocysts capable of rupturing human red blood cells and, as tested in a 1977 study, killing mice. The lethal dose for mice is 0.6 mg of nematocyst venom for a 20 g mouse, but when the venom is suspended in water, 3 mg of venom is able to kill a 20 g mouse. Venom from both the cell membranes and tentacles alike have these effects, but venom from membranes causes cell death in skin, blistering, and can cause blood to coagulate. Deeplet sea anemones have two polypeptides that are able to paralyze crabs, BTTX I and BTTX 2. BTTX II can interfere with the inactivation and activation of sodium channels in the muscle membrane of rats. It decreases the membrane potential in muscle fibers in the back of the leg as well as muscles extended by contraction. Overall, it has an effect on the membrane electrical properties of skeletal muscles while increasing the time at which the action potential is depolarized.
