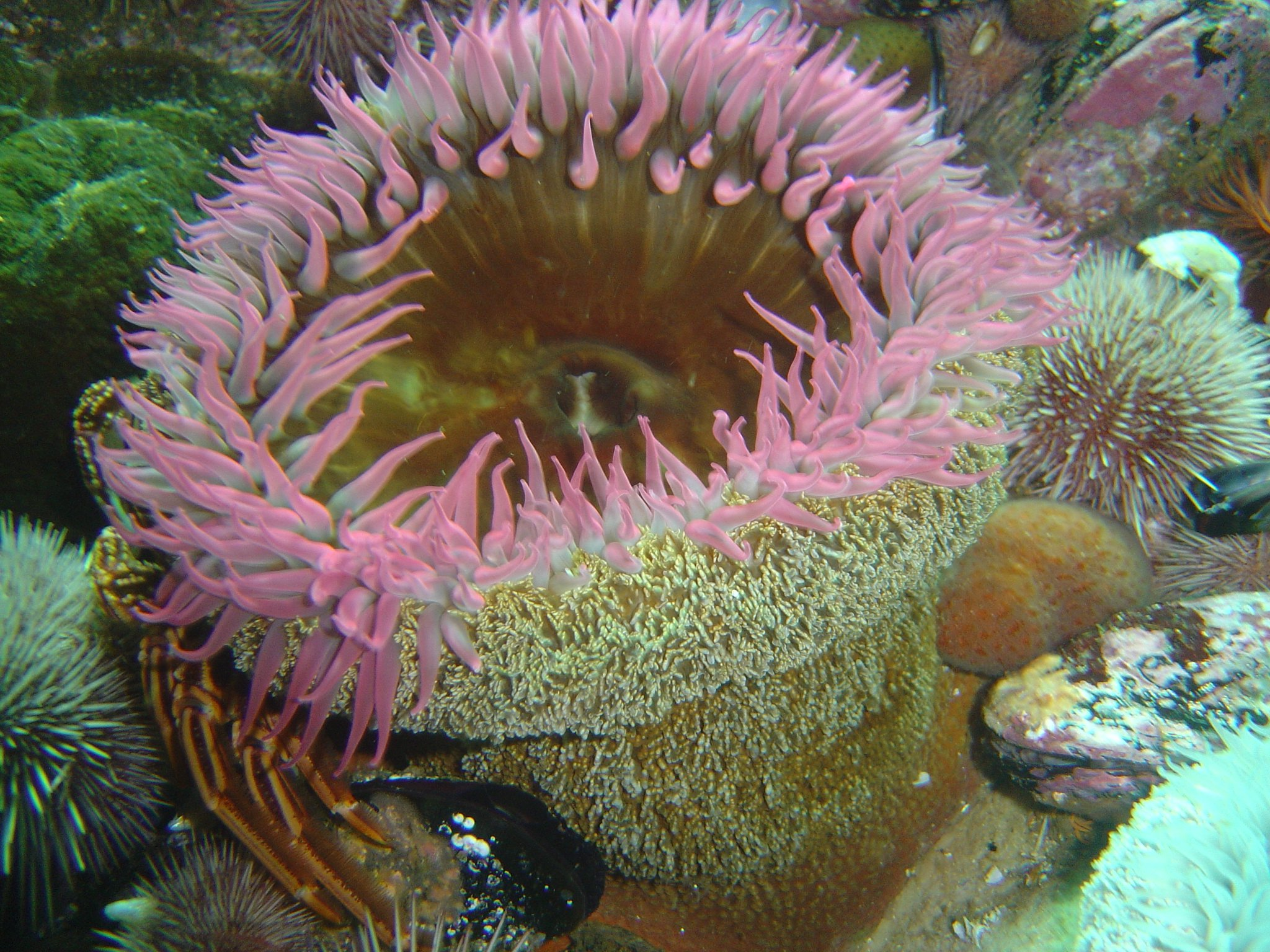

Scientific classification
- Kingdom: Animalia
- Phylum: Cnidaria
- Subphylum: Anthozoa
- Class: Hexacorallia
- Order: Actiniaria
- Family: Actiniidae
- Genus: Bunodactis
- Species: B. reynaudi

Binomial name
- Bunodactis reynaudi (Milne Edwards, 1857)

= Sandy anemone =

Species of sea anemone

The sandy anemone (Bunodactis reynaudi) is a species of sea anemone in the family Actiniidae. It is native to very shallow water round the coasts of southern Africa between Luderitz and Durban.

== Description ==
The sandy anemone is a medium-sized anemone of up to 10 cm in diameter. It has over 300 short tentacles. Its body column is covered with sticky knobs to which sand and debris particles adhere. The species has a wide range of colours, including pink, brown, green and blue often with a contrastingly-coloured oral disc.

== Distribution ==
The sandy anemone is found off the Argentinian coast and around the southern African coast from Luderitz to Durban. It inhabits waters from the intertidal to about 4 metres (13.1 ft) in depth. It is found in pools on the lower shore and in crevices on rocks, often huddled into sandy gullies and round the bases of boulders. Juveniles are often found in mussel beds.

== Ecology ==
This anemone is often seen crowded together in small gullies with strong wave action. It feeds on mussels, whelks, other molluscs, and urchins. It has an extremely strong contractile sphincter muscle which helps it grip and ingest passing food quickly before it is taken away by the waves. This anemone is larger and particularly abundant in areas where there is strong wave action that tears molluscs from the rocks, and it seems to rely on this turbulence to supply its prey.

Sea anemones lack the free-swimming medusal stage of the lifecycle of the typical Cnidarian; the sandy anemone produces eggs and sperm, and the fertilized egg develops into a planula larva which drifts as part of the plankton before settling on the seabed and developing directly into a juvenile sea anemone.*
