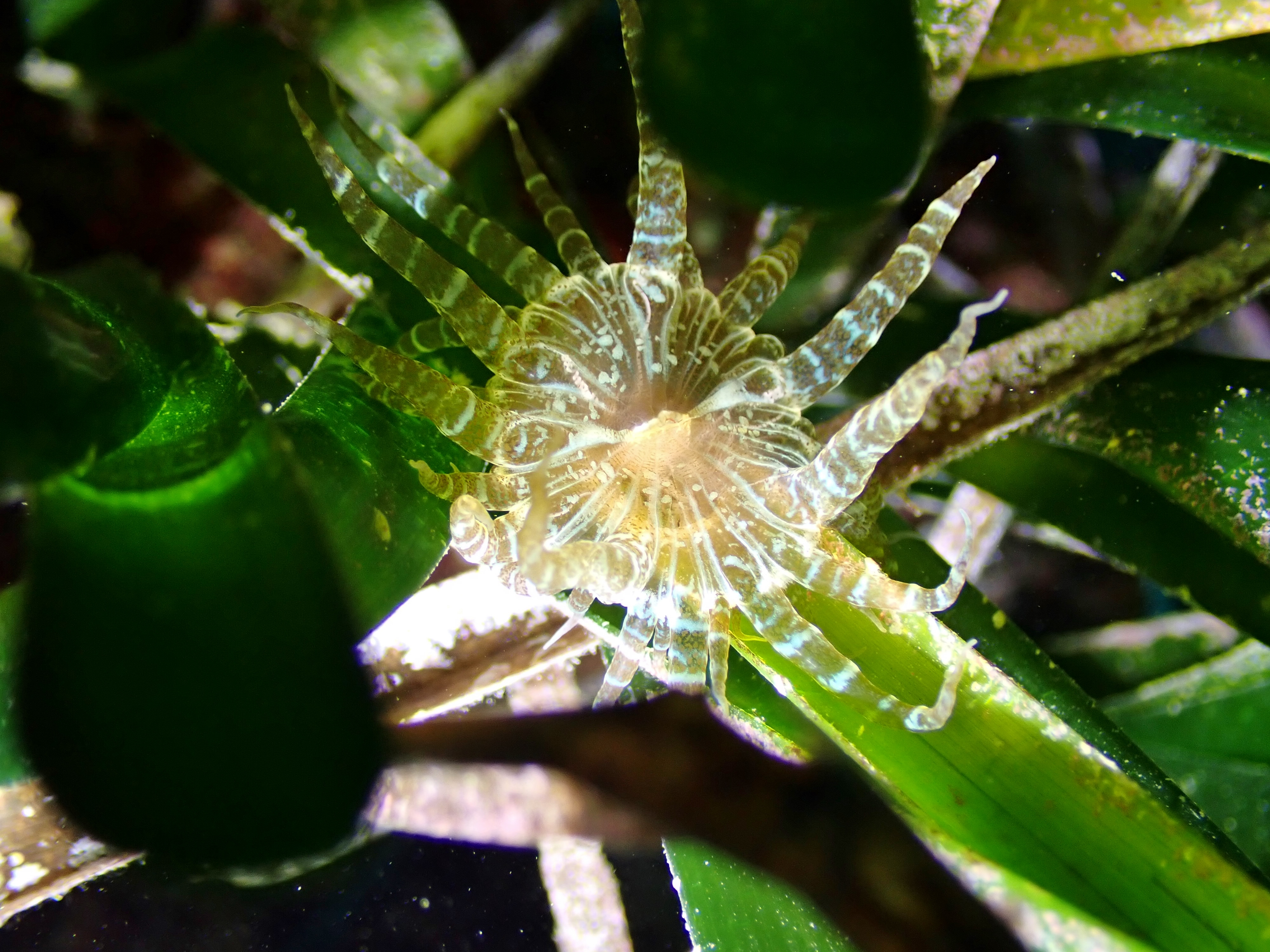

Conservation status
- Data Deficient (IUCN 3.1)

Scientific classification
- Kingdom: Animalia
- Phylum: Cnidaria
- Subphylum: Anthozoa
- Class: Hexacorallia
- Order: Actiniaria
- Family: Actiniidae
- Genus: Paranemonia
- Species: P. cinerea

Binomial name
- Paranemonia cinerea Contarini, 1844

= Paranemonia cinerea =

Species of sea anemone

Paranemonia cinerea (also known as Anemonia cinerea or as the grass crack anemone) is a sea anemone that inhabits the Mediterranean Sea. It primarily inhabits lagoons near the coast in the Adriatic Sea, and is known to inhabit the coasts of Albania, France, Greece, Italy, and Spain. Paranemonia cinerea was thought to be endemic to the Mediterranean, until it was discovered in the Ria de Arosa in 1992; though new discoveries are complicated by easy confusion with Anemonia sulcata.
