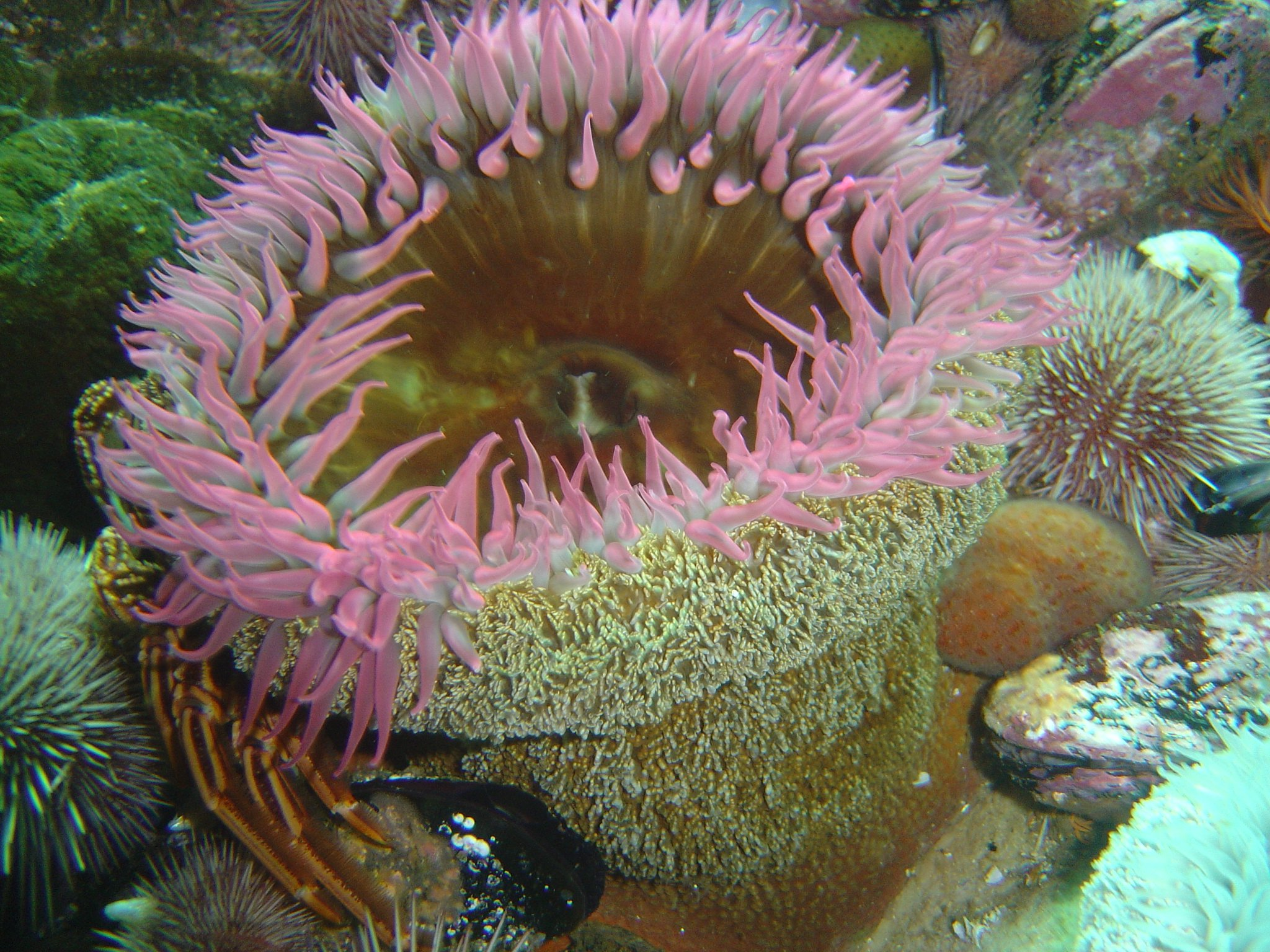
- Bunodactis reynaudi

Scientific classification
- Kingdom: Animalia
- Phylum: Cnidaria
- Subphylum: Anthozoa
- Class: Hexacorallia
- Order: Actiniaria
- Family: Actiniidae
- Genus: Bunodactis; Verril, 1899

Species
- See text

= Bunodactis =

Genus of sea anemones

Bunodactis is a genus of sea anemones in the family Actiniidae.

== Species ==
Species in the genus include:

- Bunodactis altifossa (Lager, 1911)
- Bunodactis aucklandica Carlgren, 1927
- Bunodactis bunodiformis (Hertwig, 1882)
- Bunodactis chrysobathys Parry, 1951
- Bunodactis conica (McMurrich, 1904)
- Bunodactis curacaoensis Pax, 1924
- Bunodactis elongata (McMurrich, 1904)
- Bunodactis glandulosa (Otto, 1823)
- Bunodactis hermafroditica Carlgren, 1959
- Bunodactis inornata (Stimpson, 1856)
- Bunodactis maculosa Carlgren, 1954
- Bunodactis mortenseni (Carlgren, 1924)
- Bunodactis nikobarica Carlgren, 1928
- Bunodactis octoradiata (Carlgren, 1899)
- Bunodactis patagoniensis (Carlgren, 1899)
- Bunodactis reynaudi (Milne Edwards, 1857)
- Bunodactis rubripunctata (Grube, 1840)
- Bunodactis rubrofusca Carlgren, 1924
- Bunodactis spetsbergensis (Carlgren, 1902)
- Bunodactis verrucosa (Pennant, 1777)
