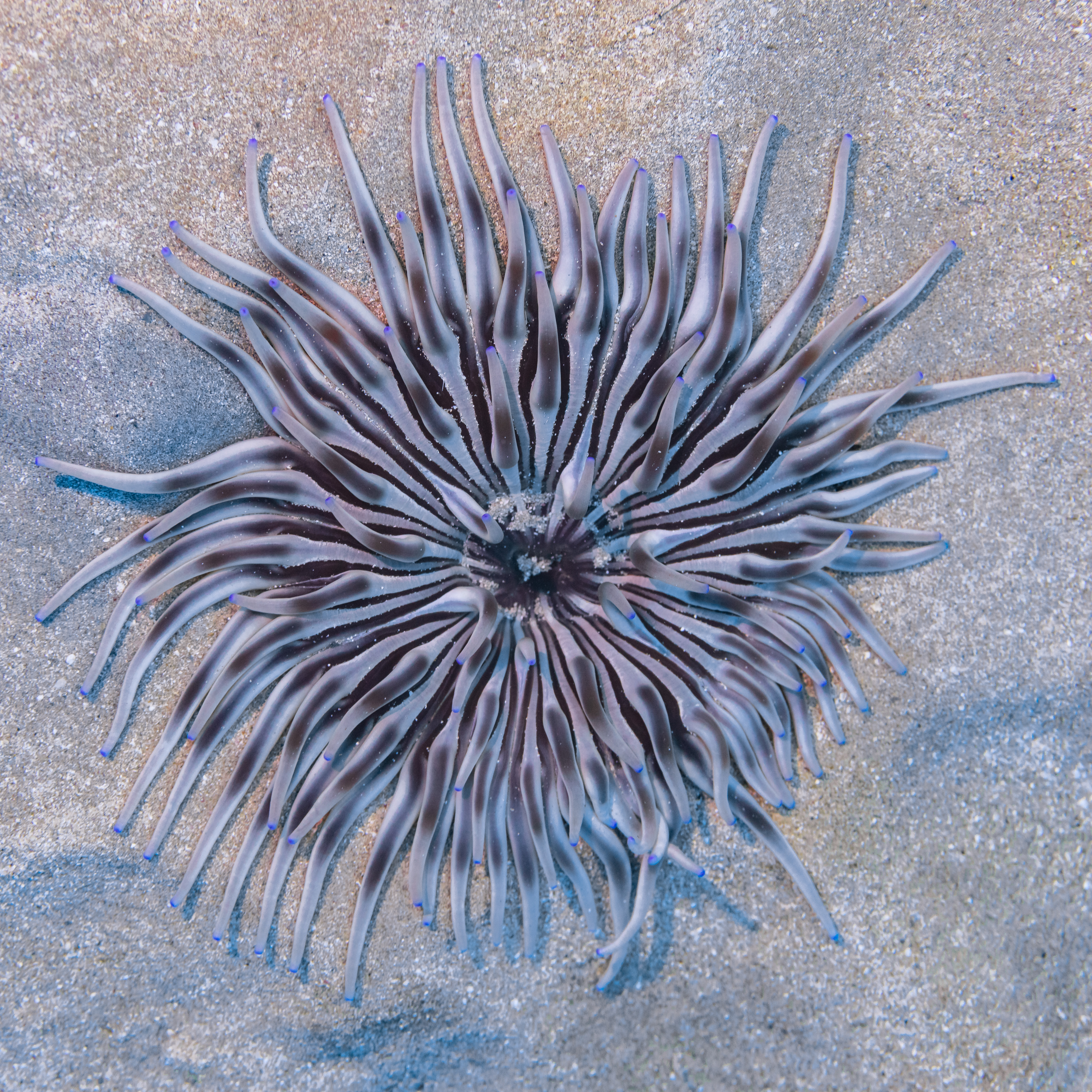

Conservation status
- Least Concern (IUCN 3.1)

Scientific classification
- Kingdom: Animalia
- Phylum: Cnidaria
- Subphylum: Anthozoa
- Class: Hexacorallia
- Order: Actiniaria
- Family: Actiniidae
- Genus: Condylactis
- Species: C. aurantiaca

Binomial name
- Condylactis aurantiaca (Delle Chiaje, 1825)

Synonyms
- List: Actinia aurantiaca Delle Chiaje, 1825; Cereactis aurantiaca (Delle Chiaje, 1822); Cereus aurentiacus (Delle Chiaje, 1822); Condylactis auratiaca

= Condylactis aurantiaca =

Species of sea anemone

Condylactis aurantiaca, commonly known as the golden anemone, is a species of sea anemone in the family Actiniidae. This species always remains largely buried in sand or sediment, attached to the substrate, with only the oral disc and tentacles visible.

== Description ==
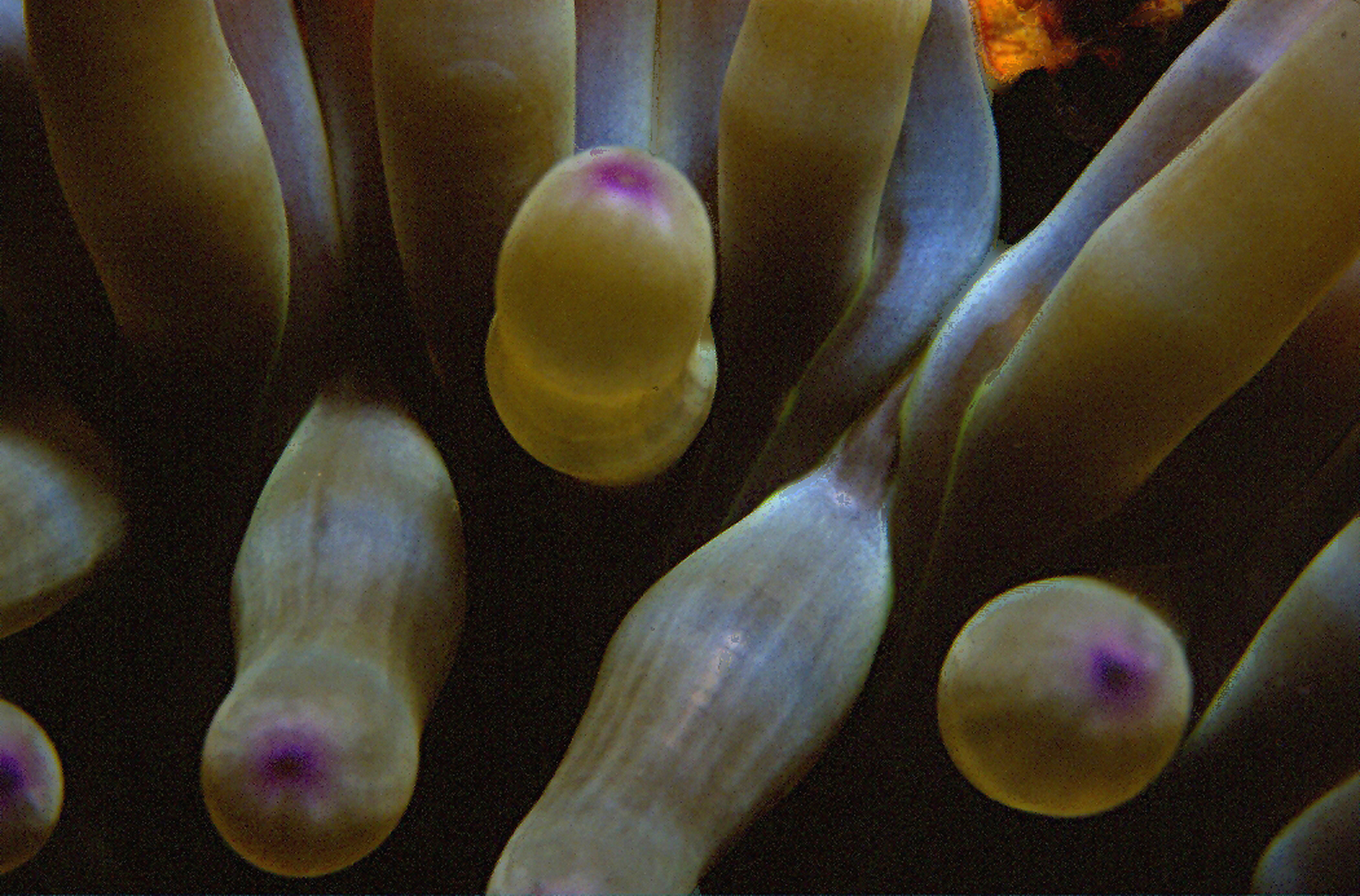
Condylactis aurantiaca tentacles

The column is translucent white with white spots, and grows to approximately 7 centimetres (2.8 in) in diameter. The oral disc may reach 12 centimetres (4.7 in). The overall diameter with the tentacles spread out is around 30 centimetres (12 in). This species usually has five whorls of tentacles, with 96 tentacles present when it is fully developed. The tentacles are each around 8 centimetres (3 in) long, green to yellow in colour, and sometimes greyish. They often have bands of white and other colours, and purple tips. The mouth, in the centre of the oral disc, is purplish.

== Distribution and habitat ==
Condylactis aurantiaca is found only in the Mediterranean Sea in depths of up to 80 metres. The base is attached to a rock, stone or shell and the column immersed in sediment, usually sand or gravel.

== Ecology ==
Like other sea anemones, this species catches prey with its tentacles which are armed with many cnidocytes, stinging cells which kill the prey. The prey is then transferred by the tentacles to the mouth. This sea anemone reproduces in spring and summer by releasing gametes into the water column where they are fertilised and develop into planula larvae. Alternatively, the gametes can be retained in the body cavity, the larvae being brooded there till the spring.

The shrimp species Periclimenes aegylios may be found living symbiotically with this sea anemone.
