= Stylobates =

Stylobates may refer to:

- Stylobates (cnidarian), a genus of cnidarians in the family Actiniidae
- Stylobates (fungus), a genus of funguses in the order Agaricales, family unassigned
