= Actinostella flosculifera =

Scientific classification
- Kingdom: Animalia
- Phylum: Cnidaria
- Subphylum: Anthozoa
- Class: Hexacorallia
- Order: Actiniaria
- Family: Actiniidae
- Genus: Actinostella
- Species: A. flosculifera

Binomial name
- Actinostella flosculifera (Le Sueur, 1817)

Synonyms
- Actinactis flosculifera; Actinia flosculifera Le Sueur, 1817; Asteractis expansa Duerden in McMurrich, 1898; Asteractis flosculifera (Le Sueur, 1817); Cradactis fasciculata (McMurrich, 1889); Evactis flosculifera Le Sueur; Oulactis fasciculata McMurrich, 1889; Oulactis flosculifera (Le Sueur, 1817); Oulactis foliosa Andres, 1883; Phyllactis conquilegaDuchassaing & Michelotti, 1860; Phyllactis flosculifera (Le Sueur, 1817)

Species of sea anemone

Actinostella flosculifera, the collared sand anemone, is a species of sea anemone in the family Actiniidae. It is found semi-immersed in the sediment in shallow water in the tropical and subtropical Atlantic Ocean.

== Description ==
The only part of this sea anemone that is normally visible is the oral disc, which lies flat on the seabed, the tall cylindrical column being immersed in sediment. The column is cream or pink and the upper part bears sticky warts to which pieces of gravel and fragments of shell adhere. The oral disc is up to 7 cm (3 in) in diameter and bears four whorls of pointed, retractable tentacles close to the funnel-shaped mouth, the outer tentacles being shorter than the inner ones. The outer part of the disc resembles a collar or ruff, and bears irregular fleshy tubercles perforated by fine pores, and separated by slender radial lines. The disc is beige, pinkish, brown or grey, sometimes with some green banding, and blends well with the surrounding sediment in colour and texture. The tentacles are translucent, and sometimes spotted with white. Symbiotic zooxanthellae are present in the tissues, particular in the collar.

== Distribution and habitat ==
Actinostella flosculifera is widely distributed in shallow water in the tropical and sub-tropical Atlantic Ocean. In the Eastern Atlantic its range extends from the Canary Islands and Madeira southwards to São Tomé and Príncipe, and in the western Atlantic its range includes the Bahamas, Bermuda, the West Indies and southwards to the coast of Brazil. The column is buried in sand, gravel or silt. This sea anemone is found at depths down to about 5 m (16 ft), typically in meadows of Thalassia testudinum and Syringodium filiforme, in lagoons and on reef flats with little wave action.

== Ecology ==
The foot of the column is usually attached to a hard substrate, a rock, a shell or a sea grass rhizome, while the oral disc lies flat on the sediment surface. During the day, the tentacles are contracted and the collar expands so that the zooxanthellae receive the maximum amount of sunlight for photosynthesis; the greenish-brown colour of the collar resembles scraps of dead seagrass and may provide camouflage. At night, the tentacles are extended to catch plankton and organic particles, and the collar contracts. At the slightest disturbance, the whole column contracts and the sea anemone disappears beneath the sediment. It has been found that two types of faecal pellets are emitted through the mouth; one type contains the normal end-products of digestion, but the other contains zooxanthellae debris covered with mucus, which continue to be produced even when the animal is starved of planktonic food. This suggests that the mainstay of the sea anemone's diet may be the digestion of the zooxanthellae found in its tissues.
