= Gyrostoma =

Gyrostoma may refer to:

- Gyrostoma (cnidarian), a genus of cnidarians in the family Actiniidae
- Polistes (Gyrostoma), a subgenus of wasps in the genus Polistes, in the family Vespidae
- Gyrostoma, a genus of gastropods in the family Pleuroceridae, synonym of Gyrotoma
