= Striped anemone =

Striped anemone may refer to:

- Anthothoe chilensis Lesson, 1830, in the family Sagartiidae
- Dofleinia armata, Wassilieff, 1908, also known as the armed anemone, in the family Actiniidae
