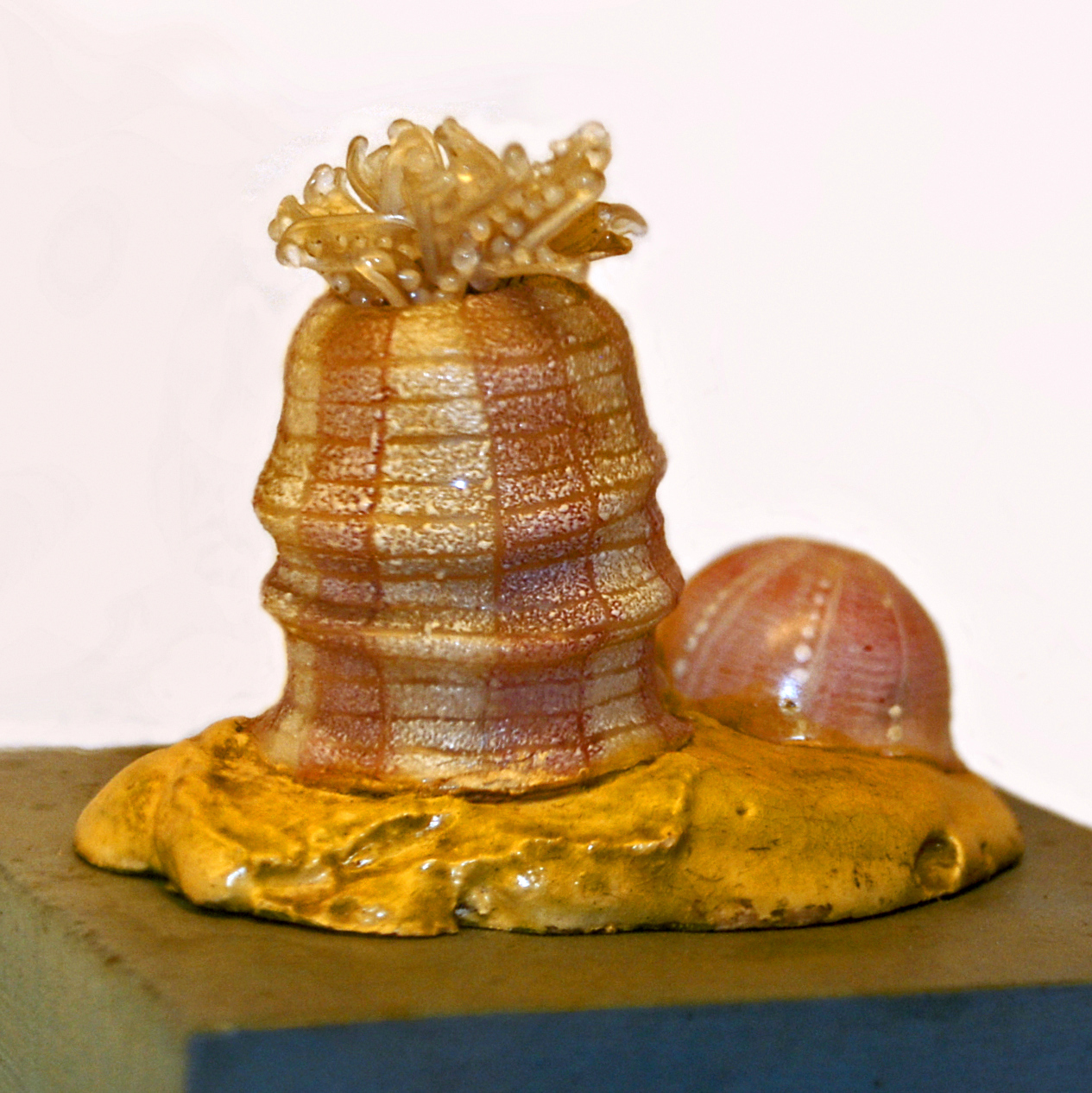
- Glass model of Aulactinia verrucosa

Conservation status
- Least Concern (IUCN 3.1) (Mediterranean)

Scientific classification
- Kingdom: Animalia
- Phylum: Cnidaria
- Subphylum: Anthozoa
- Class: Hexacorallia
- Order: Actiniaria
- Family: Actiniidae
- Genus: Aulactinia
- Species: A. verrucosa

Binomial name
- Aulactinia verrucosa (Pennant, 1777)

Synonyms
- List: Actinia bimaculata Grube, 1840; Actinia gemmacea Ellis & Solander, 1786; Actinia pedunculata Gaertner; Actinia verrucosa Pennant, 1777; Actinocereus sessilis Gaertner; Bunodactis gemmacea Ellis & Solander; Bunodactis verrucosa (Pennant, 1777); Bunodes gemmacea Gosse, 1860; Bunodes gemmaceus Ellis; Bunodes verrucosus (Pennant, 1777); Cereus bimaculatus; Cereus gemmacea; Cereus gemmaceus; Cribrina gemmacea; Cribrina verrucosa (Pennant, 1777); Hydra disciflora Gaertner, 1762

= Aulactinia verrucosa =

Species of sea anemone

Aulactinia verrucosa, the gem anemone, is a species of sea anemone in the family Actiniidae. It is found on rocky coasts in the northeastern Atlantic Ocean, North Sea and Mediterranean Sea.

== Description ==
Aulactinia verrucosa has a cylindrical body and is wider at the base than at the crown. The base is up to 25 mm (1 in) wide and the column 50 mm (2 in) tall. The walls of the column are covered by wart-like tubercles known as verrucae. Above the column, there are up to forty-eight tentacles, arranged in six cycles. The column is pink or grey, the tubercles grey or white, and the tentacles transparent and banded in pink, grey or olive.

== Distribution and habitat ==
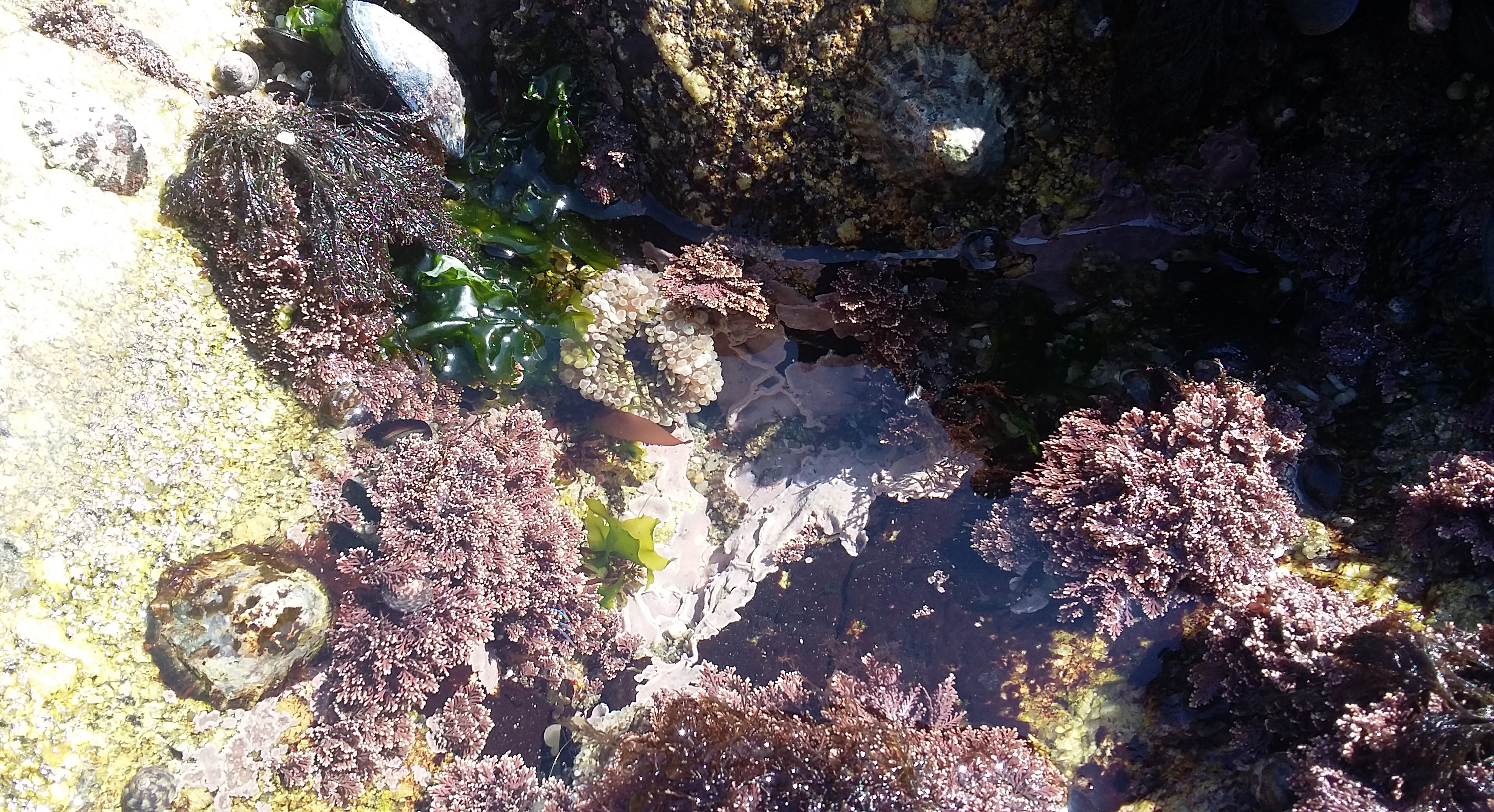
Aulactinia verrucosa in a tidepool in Póvoa de Varzim, Portugal.

Aulactinia verrucosa is native to the northeastern Atlantic Ocean, the North Sea and the Mediterranean Sea. Its northern limit is Shetland and western Scotland and it is present all round the coasts of Ireland. It is found on rocky shores both in areas with strong currents and in calmer waters. It is present in crevices and in rock pools, often among calcified red algae (Corallina), and also attached to the rock beneath the sediment in rock pools.
