= Actinopsis =

Actinopsis may refer to:

- Actinopsis (cnidarian), a genus of cnidarians in the family Actiniidae
- Actinopsis, a genus of funguses in the family Porinaceae, synonym of Trichothelium
- Actinopsis, a fossil genus of echinoderms in the family Phymosomatidae, synonym of Diplotagma
