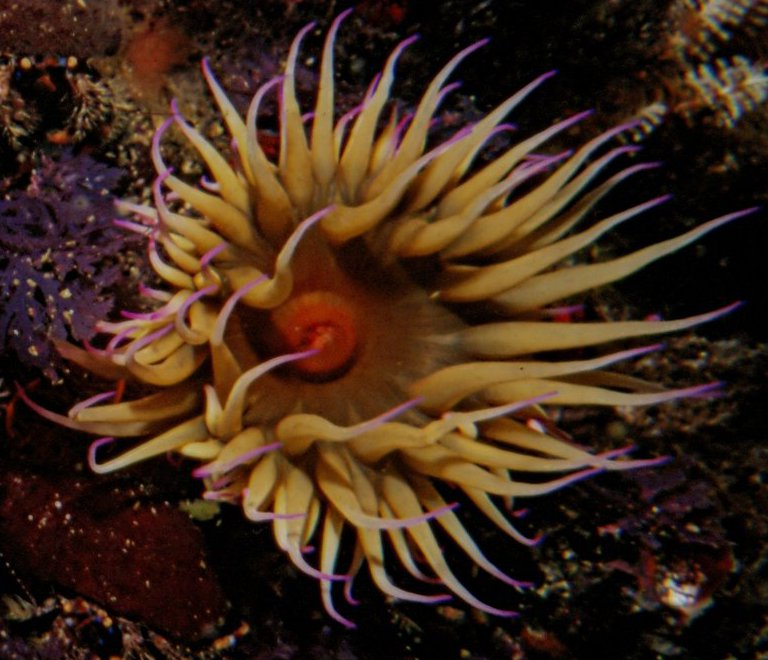

Scientific classification
- Kingdom: Animalia
- Phylum: Cnidaria
- Subphylum: Anthozoa
- Class: Hexacorallia
- Order: Actiniaria
- Family: Actiniidae
- Genus: Pseudactinia
- Species: P. flagellifera

Binomial name
- Pseudactinia flagellifera (Drayton in Dana, 1846)

= Pseudactinia flagellifera =

Species of sea anemone

Pseudactinia flagellifera, the false plum anemone, is a species of sea anemone in the family Actiniidae. It is also a member of the kingdom, Animalia.

False plum anemone in an aquarium.

== Description ==
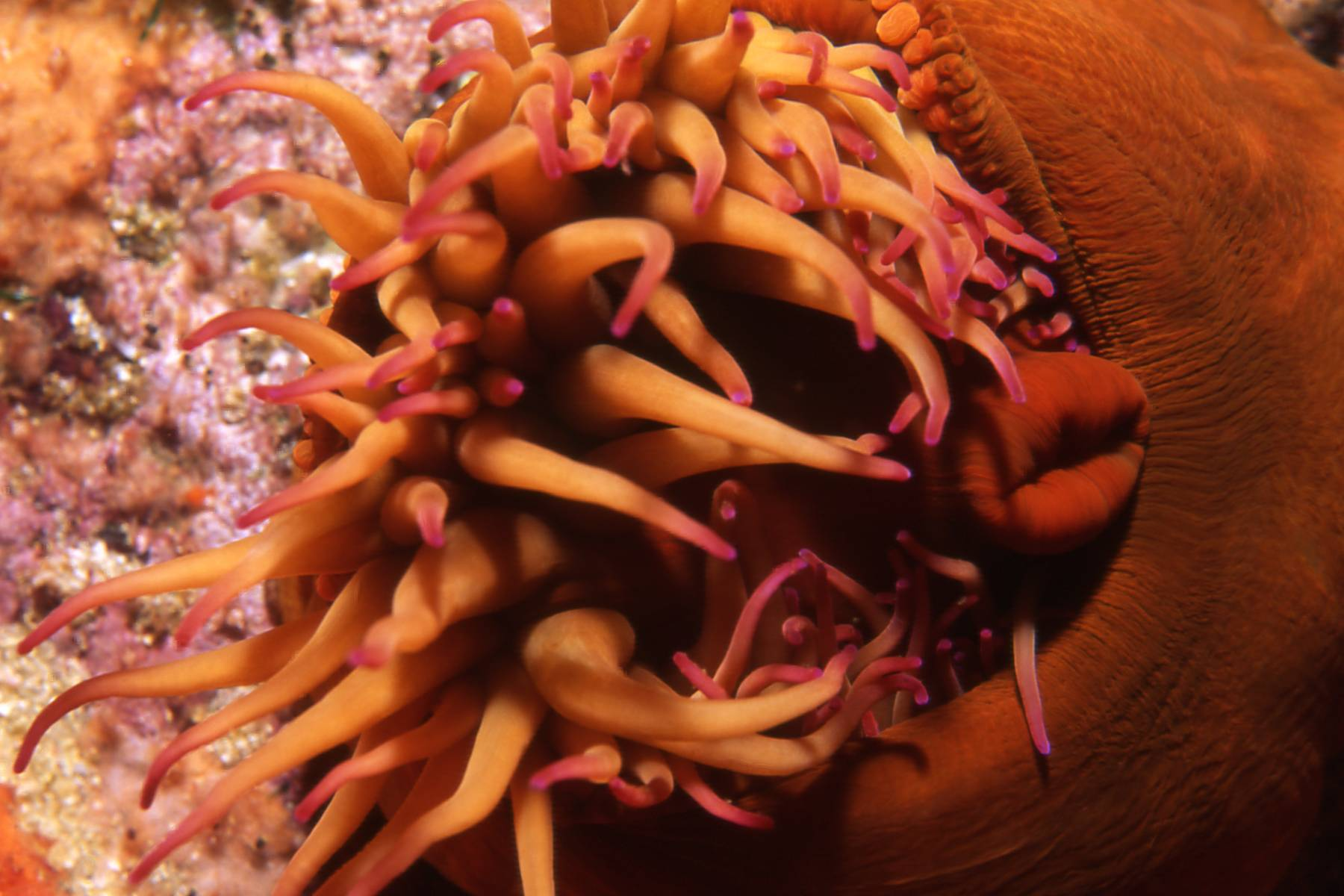
A close up of the false plum anemone showing spherules in a deflated state

The false plum anemone is a large anemone of up to 20 cm in diameter. It has a smooth column that may be orange, yellow or red. The tips of its tentacles are often mauve. It has a protruding round mouth, and the oral surface may be striped. It has rows of small round protrusions (spherules) outside its tentacles.

== Distribution ==
It is found around the southern African coast from Luderitz to Durban. It is also found around Madeira. It inhabits waters from the intertidal to 35m in depth.

== Ecology ==
The false plum anemone cannot easily retract its tentacles.

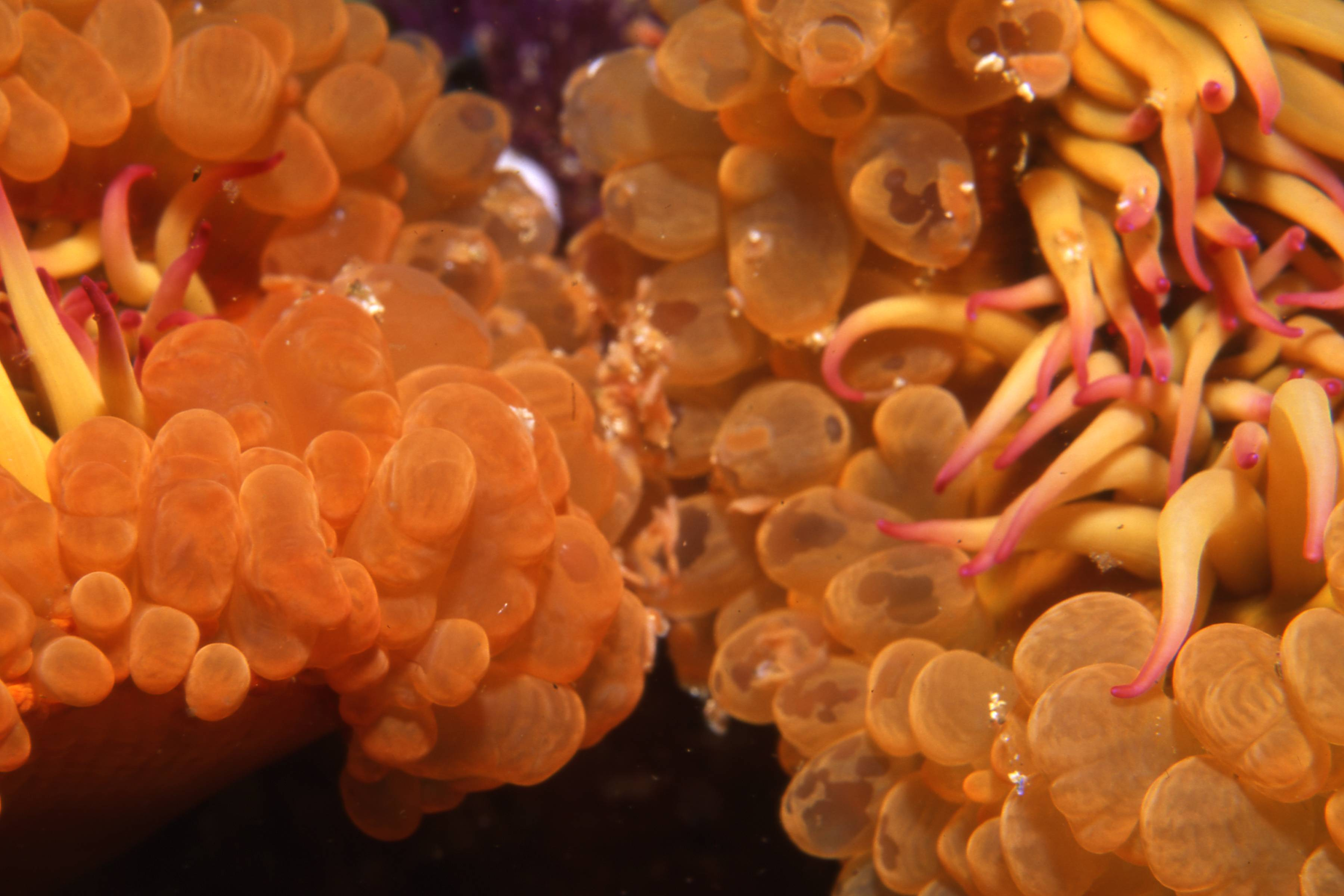
Genetically unrelated false plum anemones fighting each other using their spherules

It preys mostly on molluscs, and has been reported to have a serious sting which can affect humans. It is able to move about slowly and maintains territory by stinging genetically unrelated anemones with its spherules.
