= Stylobates calcifer =

Scientific classification
- Kingdom: Animalia
- Phylum: Cnidaria
- Subphylum: Anthozoa
- Class: Hexacorallia
- Order: Actiniaria
- Family: Actiniidae
- Genus: Stylobates
- Species: S. calcifer

Binomial name
- Stylobates calcifer (Yoshikawa, Izumi, Moritaki, Kimura, & Yanagi, 2022)

Species of sea anemone

Stylobates calcifer is a species of carcinoecium-forming sea anemone in Japan. S. calcifer produces carcinoecium that forms a thin cover around the hermit crab species Pagurodofleinia doederleini. P. deoderleini shares a symbiotic relationship with S. calcifer. S. calcifer inhabits the top of the hermit crab's shell attaching itself by the carcinoecium it produces. The anemone feeds on the suspended particulates of organic matter from the water column or the food residuals. It lives at a depth of 100 to 400 meters (330 to 1,310 ft) around the Pacific side of Kyushu, Japan. According to a behavioral observation, the growth rate of the anemone and the growth of its host do not work synchronously, which differs from the previously known constraint placed on hermit crabs, in respect to the growth rate of the carcinoecium.

The Stylobates Calcifer is distinct from the other organisms in its species due to the shape of the marginal sphincter muscle, the distribution of cnidae, the direction of the oral disk, and host association.
