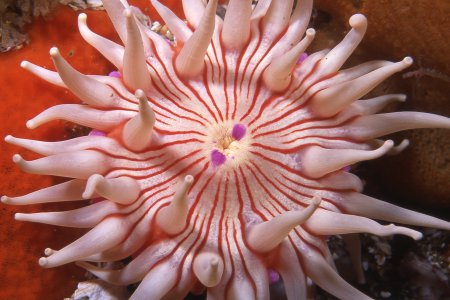

Scientific classification
- Kingdom: Animalia
- Phylum: Cnidaria
- Subphylum: Anthozoa
- Class: Hexacorallia
- Order: Actiniaria
- Family: Actiniidae
- Genus: Anthostella
- Species: A. stephensoni

Binomial name
- Anthostella stephensoni Carlgren, 1938

= Anthostella stephensoni =

Species of sea anemone

Anthostella stephensoni, the violet-spotted anemone, is a species of sea anemone in the family Actiniidae.

== Description ==
The violet-spotted anemone is a medium-sized anemone of up to 12 cm in diameter. It has a smooth yellow column with randomly placed bright violet spots. Scarlet lines radiate from the mouth to 48 short blunt tentacles. Two violet spots are normally found on either side of the mouth.

== Distribution ==
The violet-spotted anemone is only found around the southern African coast from Luderitz to Richards Bay. It inhabits waters from low tide to at least 18m in depth.
