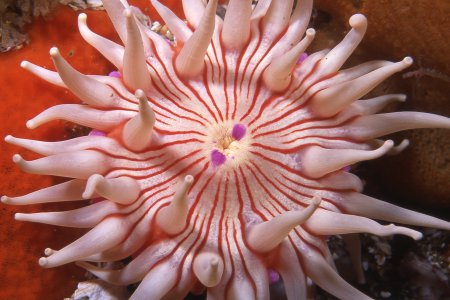
- Violet-spotted anemone

Scientific classification
- Kingdom: Animalia
- Phylum: Cnidaria
- Subphylum: Anthozoa
- Class: Hexacorallia
- Order: Actiniaria
- Family: Actiniidae
- Genus: Anthostella; Carlgren, 1938

Species
- A. badia (Carlgren, 1900); A. stephensoni Carlgren, 1938

= Anthostella =

Genus of sea anemones

Anthostella is a genus of sea anemones in the family Actiniidae. It has two described species.
