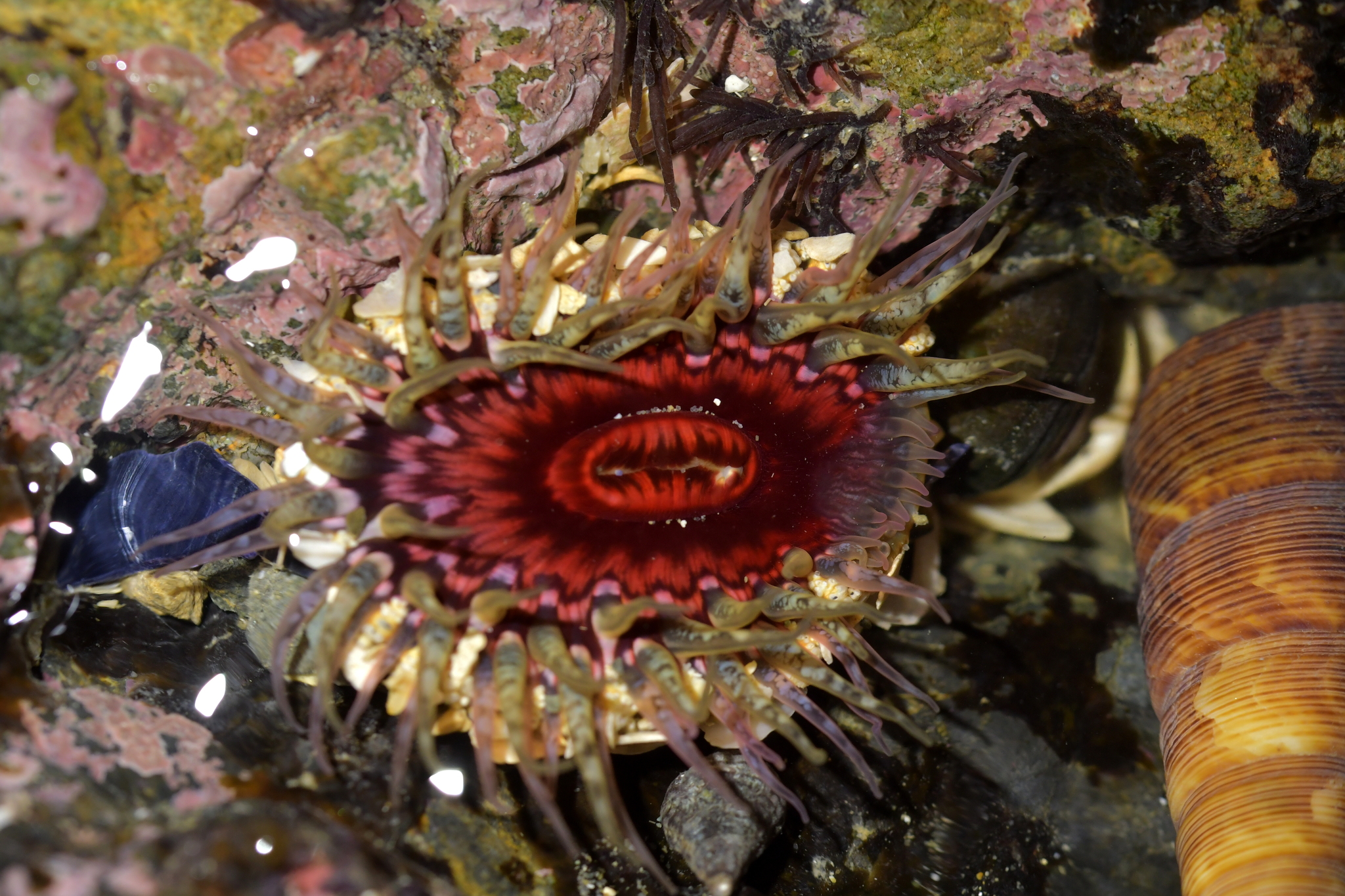

Scientific classification
- Kingdom: Animalia
- Phylum: Cnidaria
- Subphylum: Anthozoa
- Class: Hexacorallia
- Order: Actiniaria
- Family: Actiniidae
- Genus: Oulactis
- Species: O. muscosa

Binomial name
- Oulactis muscosa (Drayton in Dana, 1846)

Synonyms
- Metridium muscosum Drayton in Dana, 1846; Oulactis mucosa; Oulactis plicata Hutton, 1878; Oulactis plicatus Hutton, 1879; Oulactis plumosa (Drayton)

= Oulactis muscosa =

Species of sea anemone

Oulactis muscosa, also known as the sand anemone and speckled anemone, is a species of sea anemone in the family Actiniidae.

== Description ==
This is a large, greenish-grey to off-white species, growing to 60–80 mm. It has up to one hundred short, conical tentacles that are transparent to pale greenish to greyish-white, to pale brown, grouped into three rows. On the column, there are vertical rows of adhesive bumps (verrucae) that are relatively darker than the rest of the body. The tentacles also have horizontal black bands.

The oral disk varies in colouration, and is sometimes red, green, black or white, and may have streaks of darker colour radiating outward from its mouth.

This species can be recognized by gravel, bits of shell or coarse sand that it attaches between its tentacles.

Oulactis muscosa is closely related to Oulactis mcmurrichi (the southern sand anemone), which shares the same distribution and habitat. Oulactis muscosa can be distinguished by the difference in colouration. The column of Oulactis macmurrichi is more reddish-brown, or green to light purple, and has light green tentacles. It is possible that the two are variants of the same species.

== Distribution ==
This anemone is found in New Zealand, and in the Australian waters of southern Queensland, New South Wales, Victoria, Tasmania and South Australia.

== Habitat ==
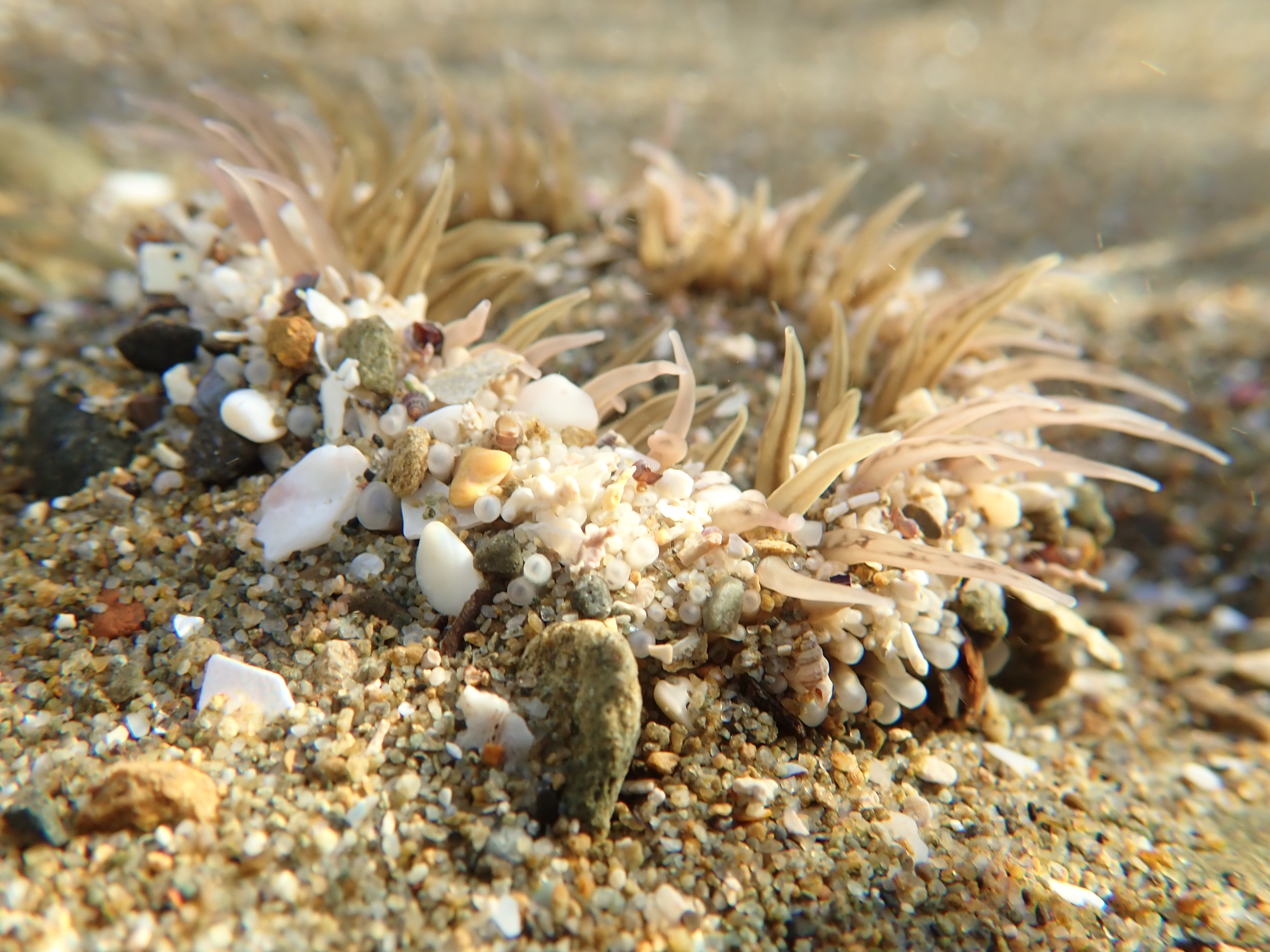
Oulactis muscosa in sandy habitat.

Oulactis muscosa normally lives in rocky areas of the mid to low intertidal zone, in sand which has settled into cracks and crevices. Usually, only the oral disc and tentacles are visible.

== Diet ==
Oulactis muscosa feeds on small mussels.

== Abundance ==
Oulactis muscosa is not sought after by the pet industry, and is abundant. Thus, it is not threatened.
