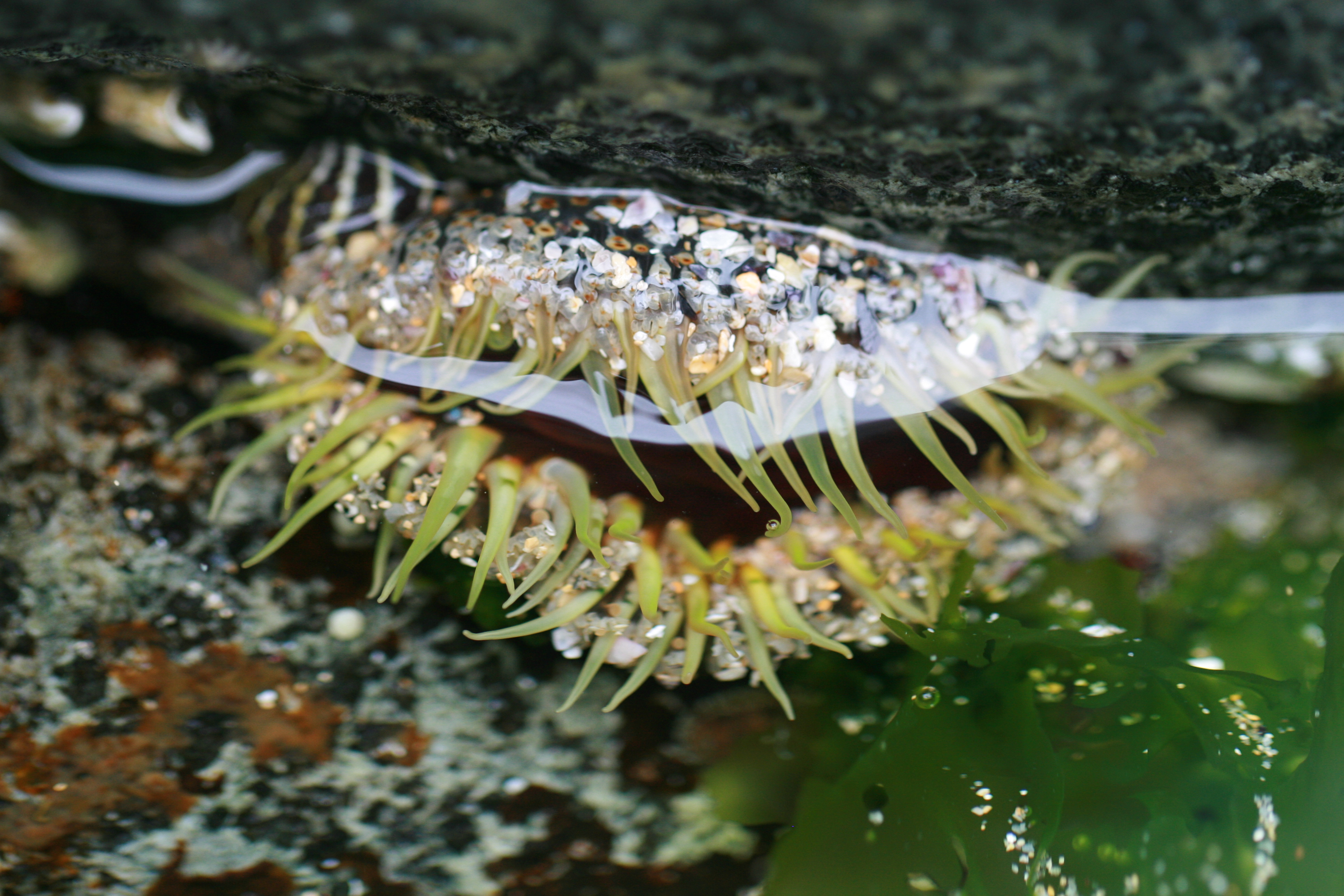
- Oulactis muscosa

Scientific classification
- Domain: Eukaryota
- Kingdom: Animalia
- Phylum: Cnidaria
- Subphylum: Anthozoa
- Class: Hexacorallia
- Order: Actiniaria
- Family: Actiniidae
- Genus: Oulactis; Milne-Edwards & Haime, 1851

= Oulactis =

Genus of sea anemones

Oulactis is a genus of sea anemones in the family Actiniidae, found in the intertidal zone. It contains the following species:

- Oulactis cincta (Stuckey, 1909)
- Oulactis coliumensis (Riemann-Zürneck & Gallardo, 1990)
- Oulactis concinnata (Drayton in Dana, 1846)
- Oulactis magna (Stuckey, 1909)
- Oulactis mcmurrichi (Lager, 1911)
- Oulactis muscosa (Drayton in Dana, 1846)
- Oulactis orientalis (Averincev, 1967)
