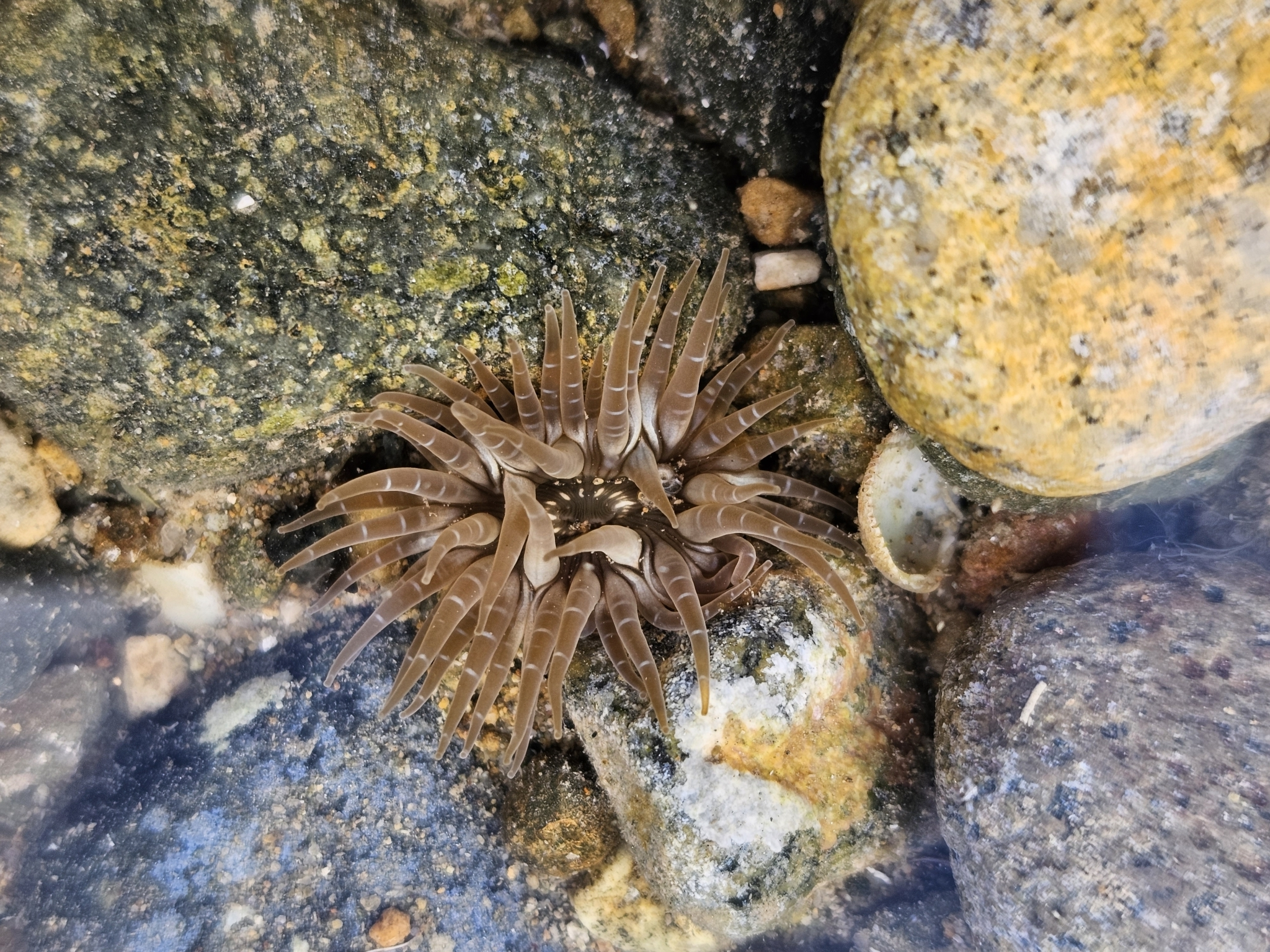
- Isoaulactinia stelloides

Scientific classification
- Domain: Eukaryota
- Kingdom: Animalia
- Phylum: Cnidaria
- Subphylum: Anthozoa
- Class: Hexacorallia
- Order: Actiniaria
- Family: Actiniidae
- Genus: Isoaulactinia; Belém, Herrera Moreno & Schlenz, 1996

= Isoaulactinia =

Genus of sea anemones

Isoaulactinia is a genus of cnidarians belonging to the family Actiniidae.

The species of this genus are found in Central America.

Species:

- Isoaulactinia hespervolita Daly, 2004
- Isoaulactinia stelloides (McMurrich, 1889)
