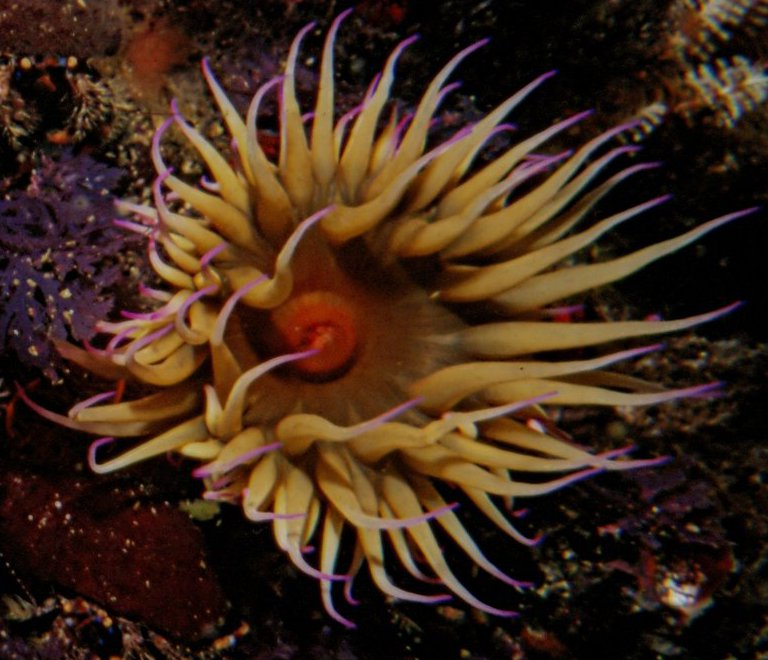
- Pseudactinia flagellifera

Scientific classification
- Kingdom: Animalia
- Phylum: Cnidaria
- Subphylum: Anthozoa
- Class: Hexacorallia
- Order: Actiniaria
- Family: Actiniidae
- Genus: Pseudactinia; Carlgren, 1928

Species
- = See text

= Pseudactinia =

Genus of sea anemones

Pseudactinia is a genus of sea anemones in the family Actiniidae.

== Species ==
Species in the genus include:

- Pseudactinia flagellifera (Drayton in Dana, 1846)
- Pseudactinia infecunda (McMurrich, 1893)
- Pseudactinia plettenbergensis Carlgren, 1928
- Pseudactinia varia Carlgren, 1938
