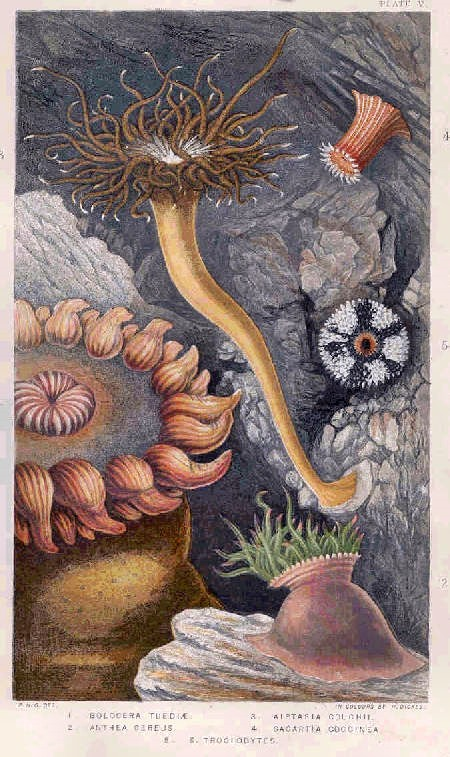
- Bolocera tuediae

Scientific classification
- Kingdom: Animalia
- Phylum: Cnidaria
- Subphylum: Anthozoa
- Class: Hexacorallia
- Order: Actiniaria
- Family: Actiniidae
- Genus: Bolocera; Gosse, 1860

Species
- See text

Synonyms
- Bulocera; Polystomidia; Polystomidium Hertwig, 1882

= Bolocera =

Genus of sea anemones

Bolocera is a genus of sea anemone in the family Actiniidae.

== Species ==
The following species are recognized in the genus Bolocera:

- Bolocera africana Pax, 1909
- Bolocera kensmithi Eash-Loucks & Fautin, 2012
- Bolocera kerguelensis Studer, 1879
- Bolocera maxima Carlgren, 1921
- Bolocera norvegica Pax, 1909
- Bolocera pannosa McMurrich, 1893
- Bolocera paucicornis Dunn, 1893
- Bolocera somaliensis Carlgren, 1928
- Bolocera tuediae (Johnston, 1832)
