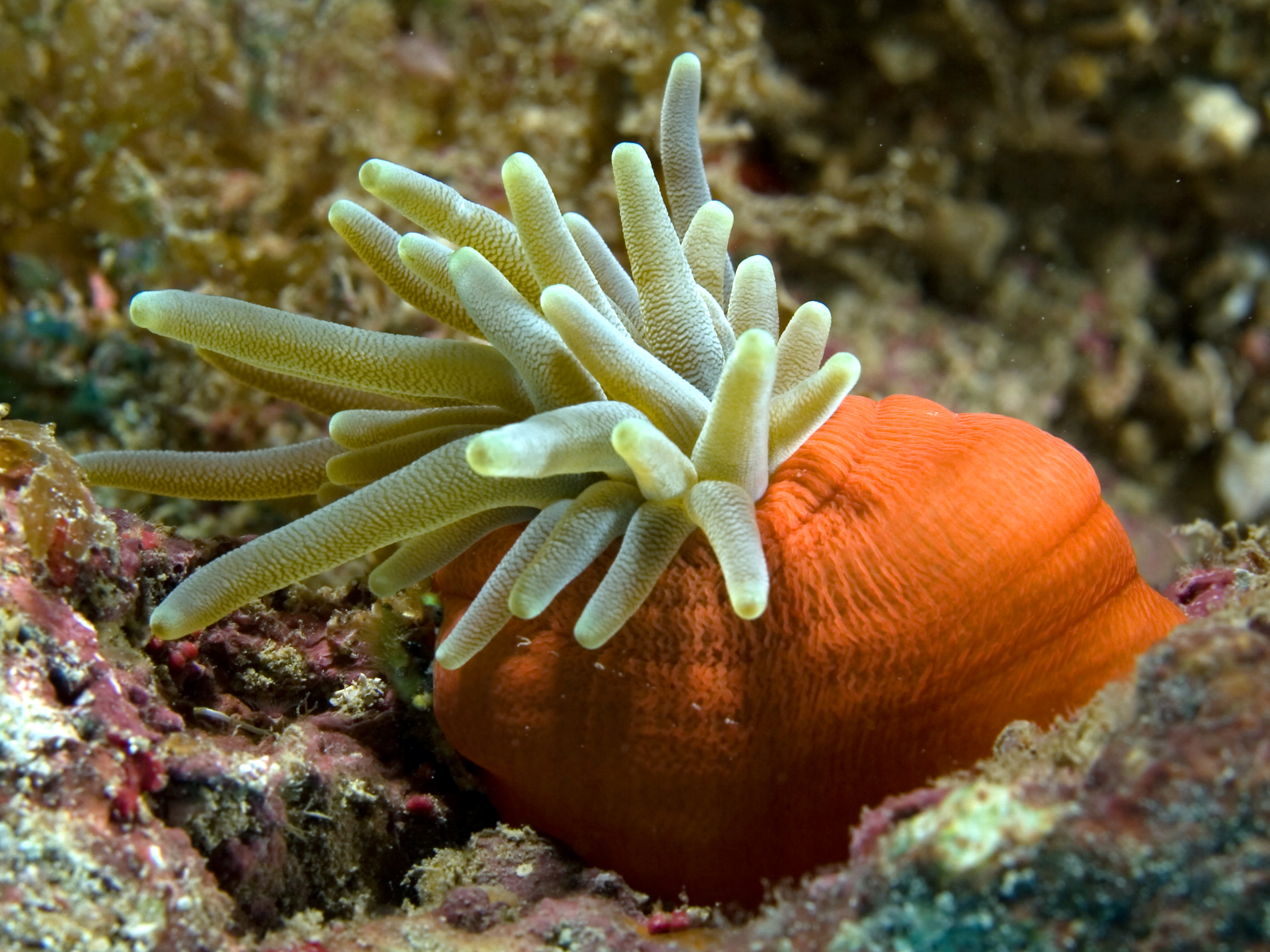
- Condylactis gigantea (Giant Anemone)

Scientific classification
- Domain: Eukaryota
- Kingdom: Animalia
- Phylum: Cnidaria
- Class: Hexacorallia
- Order: Actiniaria
- Family: Actiniidae
- Genus: Condylactis; Duchassaing de Fombressin & Michelotti, 1864

= Condylactis =

Genus of cnidarians

Condylactis is a genus of cnidarians belonging to the family Actiniidae.

The genus has almost cosmopolitan distribution.

Species include:

- Condylactis aurantiaca (Delle Chiaje, 1825)
- Condylactis gigantea (Weinland, 1860)
- Condylactis kerguelensis (Studer, 1879)
- Condylactis parvicornis Kwietniewski, 1898
