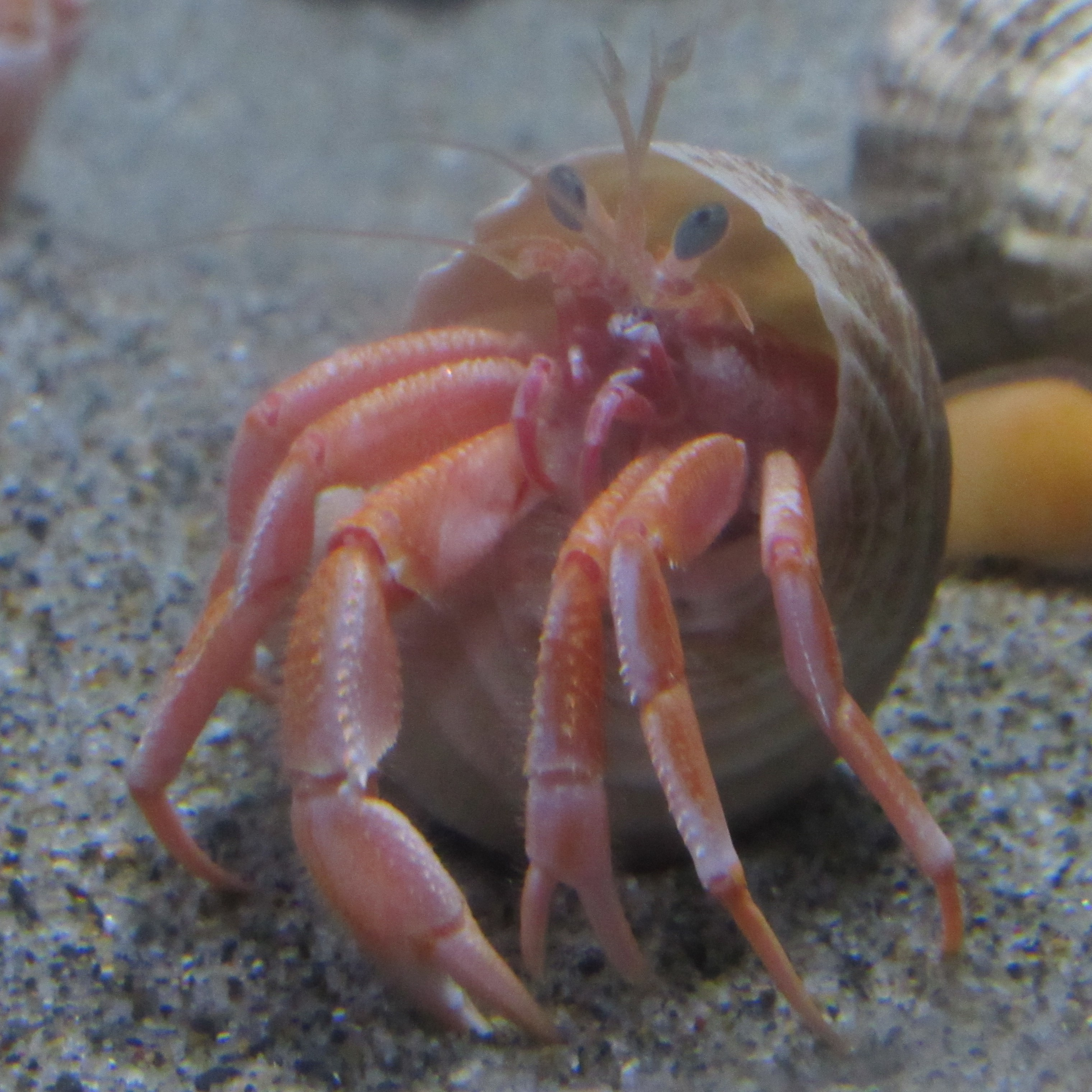

Scientific classification
- Kingdom: Animalia
- Phylum: Arthropoda
- Class: Malacostraca
- Order: Decapoda
- Suborder: Pleocyemata
- Infraorder: Anomura
- Family: Paguridae
- Genus: Pagurodofleinia; Asakura, 2005
- Species: P. doederleini

Binomial name
- Pagurodofleinia doederleini (Doflein, 1902)

= Pagurodofleinia =

Species of hermit crab

Pagurodofleinia is a monotypic genus of hermit crab. The only species is Pagurodofleinia doederleini. The species lives in the deep Pacific sea-floor of Japan at depths of 100 to 400 meters. It lives in a symbiotic relationship with a carcinoecium-forming sea anemone called Stylobates calcifer. Stylobates calcifer rest on top of Pagurodofleinia deoderleini where it forms a thin shell around Pagurodofleinia doederlenini.
