= Lake Vouliagmeni =

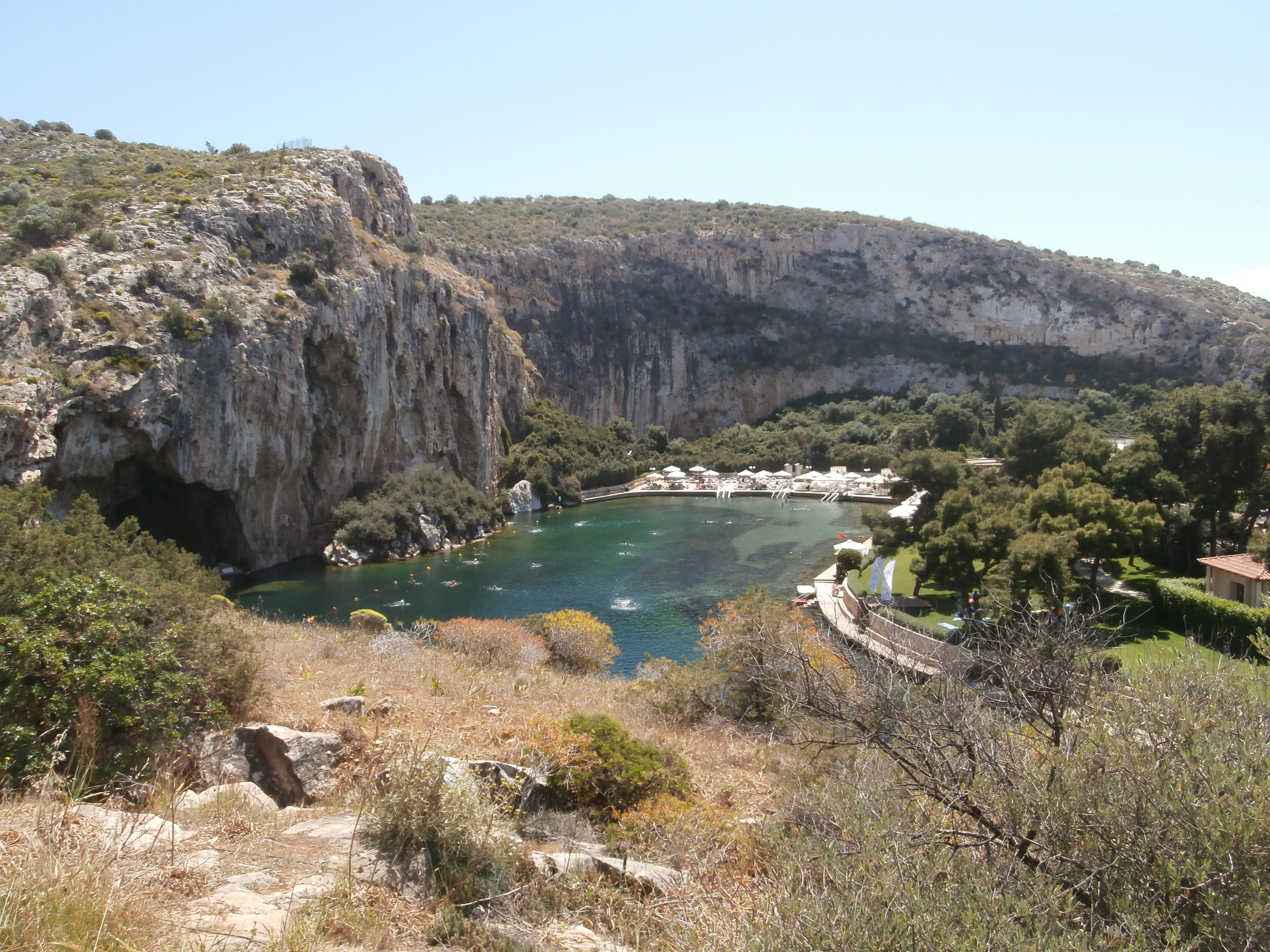
- View of the Lake Vouliagmeni

- Location within Greece
- Location: Vouliagmeni, Greece
- Coordinates: 37.807908°N 23.785610°E
- Type: brackish lake

Lake Vouliagmeni (Greek for 'sunken lake') is a small brackish-water lake fed by underground currents seeping through the mass of Mount Hymettus located to the south of Vouliagmeni, Athens, Greece.

== Description ==
The lagoon formed about 2,000 years ago. It was once a large cavern that collapsed following an earthquake. The outline of the collapsed cavern roof can be clearly discerned from a distance.

The lake has quite unique environmental conditions: it is supplied with warm seawater (28-35°C) via an underground channel spreading through a network of flooded caves, so its temperature never drops below 18 °C (usually ranges around 21-24 °C), whereas a freshwater spring reduces its salinity to brackish levels (14.5-18 psu).

It continues deep inside the mountain in an underwater cave never fully explored, as its end seems impossible to trace even by employing sonar detection. Many underwater expeditions have been carried out in order to chart it, and a few amateur divers have drowned trying.

Because of its constant warm water temperature and its rich content in hydrogen sulphide, the lake functions as a spa since the end of the 19th century.

== Ecology ==
The lake hosts the only existing population of a species of sea anemone, Paranemonia vouliagmeniensis. It has been declared a natural monument by the Greek State and is part of a Natura 2000.
