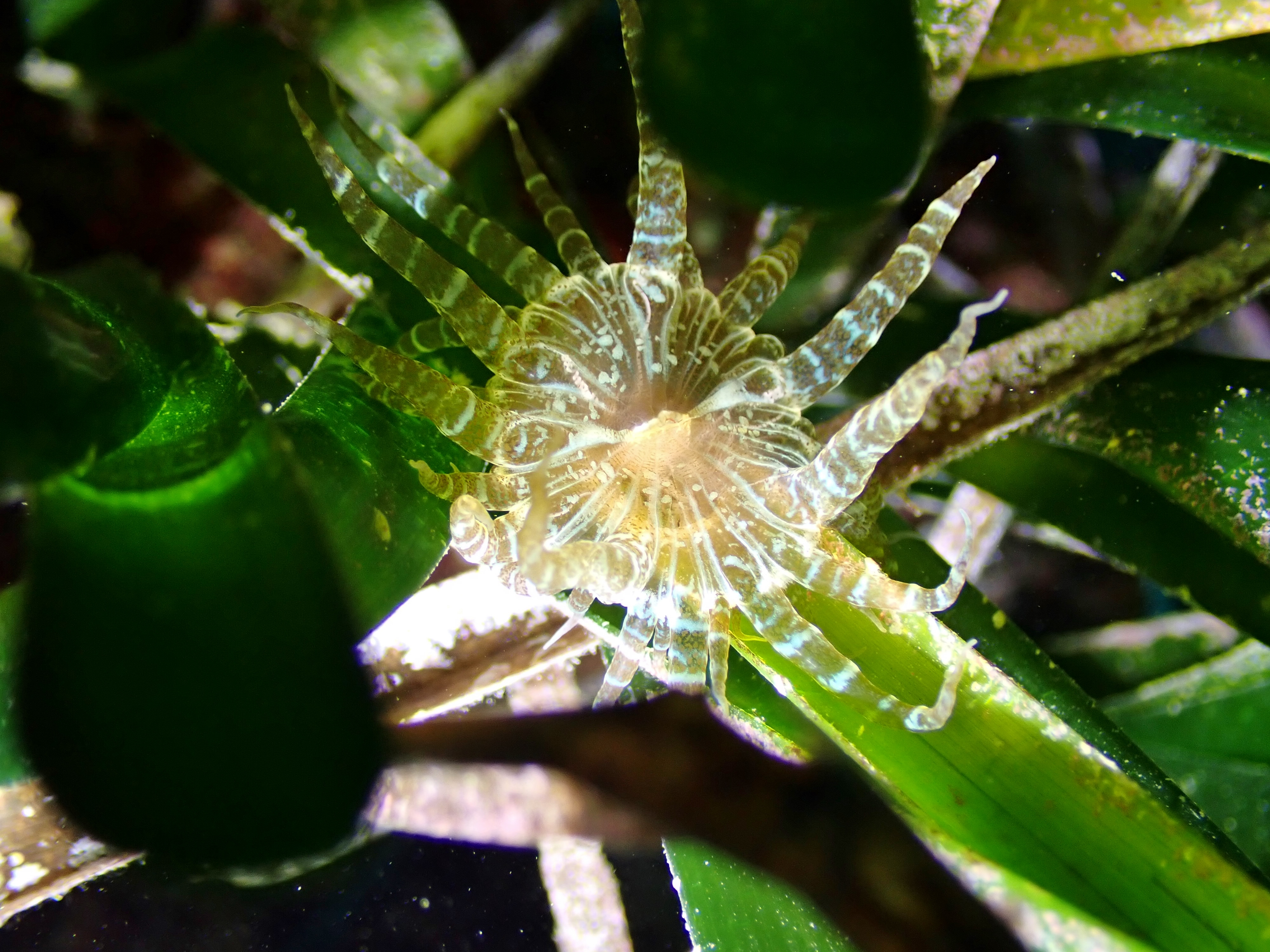
- Paranemonia cinerea

Scientific classification
- Domain: Eukaryota
- Kingdom: Animalia
- Phylum: Cnidaria
- Subphylum: Anthozoa
- Class: Hexacorallia
- Order: Actiniaria
- Family: Actiniidae
- Genus: Paranemonia; Carlgren, 1900

= Paranemonia =

Genus of sea anemones

Paranemonia is a genus of sea anemones that consists of two species; both of which are endemic to the Mediterranean Sea:

== Species ==
- Paranemonia cinerea (Contarini, 1845) (Grass Crack Anemone)
- Paranemonia vouliagmeniensis (Doumenc, England & Chintiroglou, 1987)
