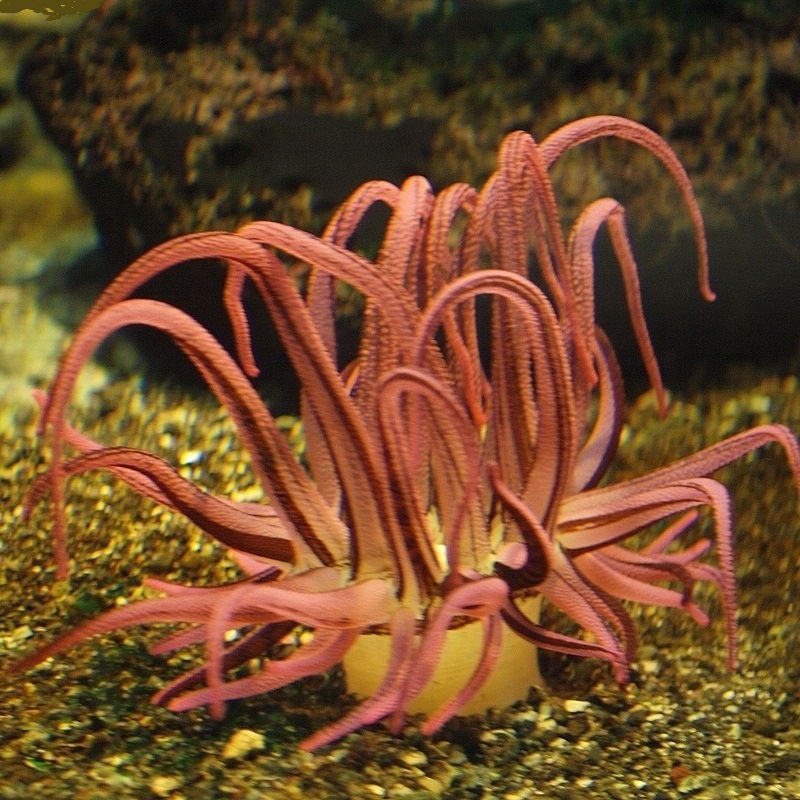

Scientific classification
- Kingdom: Animalia
- Phylum: Cnidaria
- Subphylum: Anthozoa
- Class: Hexacorallia
- Order: Actiniaria
- Family: Actiniidae
- Genus: Dofleinia; Wassilieff, 1908
- Species: D. armata

Binomial name
- Dofleinia armata Wassilieff, 1908

Synonyms
- Dofelinia armata; Dofleina armata; Doflenia armata

= Dofleinia =

Species of sea anemone

Close-up

Dofleinia armata, commonly known as the striped anemone or armed anemone, is a species of sea anemone in the family Actiniidae. It is the only species in the genus Dofleinia.

== Description ==
Dofleinia armata is one of Australia's largest species of anemone. It can grow to 20 cm in diameter, with tentacles up to 50 cm long.

The base of this species is broad, the column smooth, with a broad, flat oral disc. It has long inner tentacles which are a minimum of double the size of the outer tentacles. The tentacles have visible papillae on the surface. These contain nematocysts that are very large. The oral disc has papillae as well, but weaker. These also contain nematocysts.

The surface of the tentacles end in a tip that is somewhat swollen. The tentacles are either cream, brown, or plain, and are striped. They have a surface that is scale-like and are often observed curling into ball shapes that hide the mouth.

It is able to expand its body and tentacles due to a well-developed hydrostatic system.

== Distribution ==
This species is known to live in the tropical waters of Australia as far south as Perth, Western Australia. It is also known to occur in the Philippines and Indonesia.

== Habitat ==
This species lives at depths of up to 20 metres in the intertidal zone on sloping, sheltered reefs, as well as in mangroves. It may be found in fine silt or mud.

== Danger to humans ==
The sting of Dofleinia armata presents a danger to humans. Injuries resulting from contact with this species are considered very painful, and can take several months to heal.
