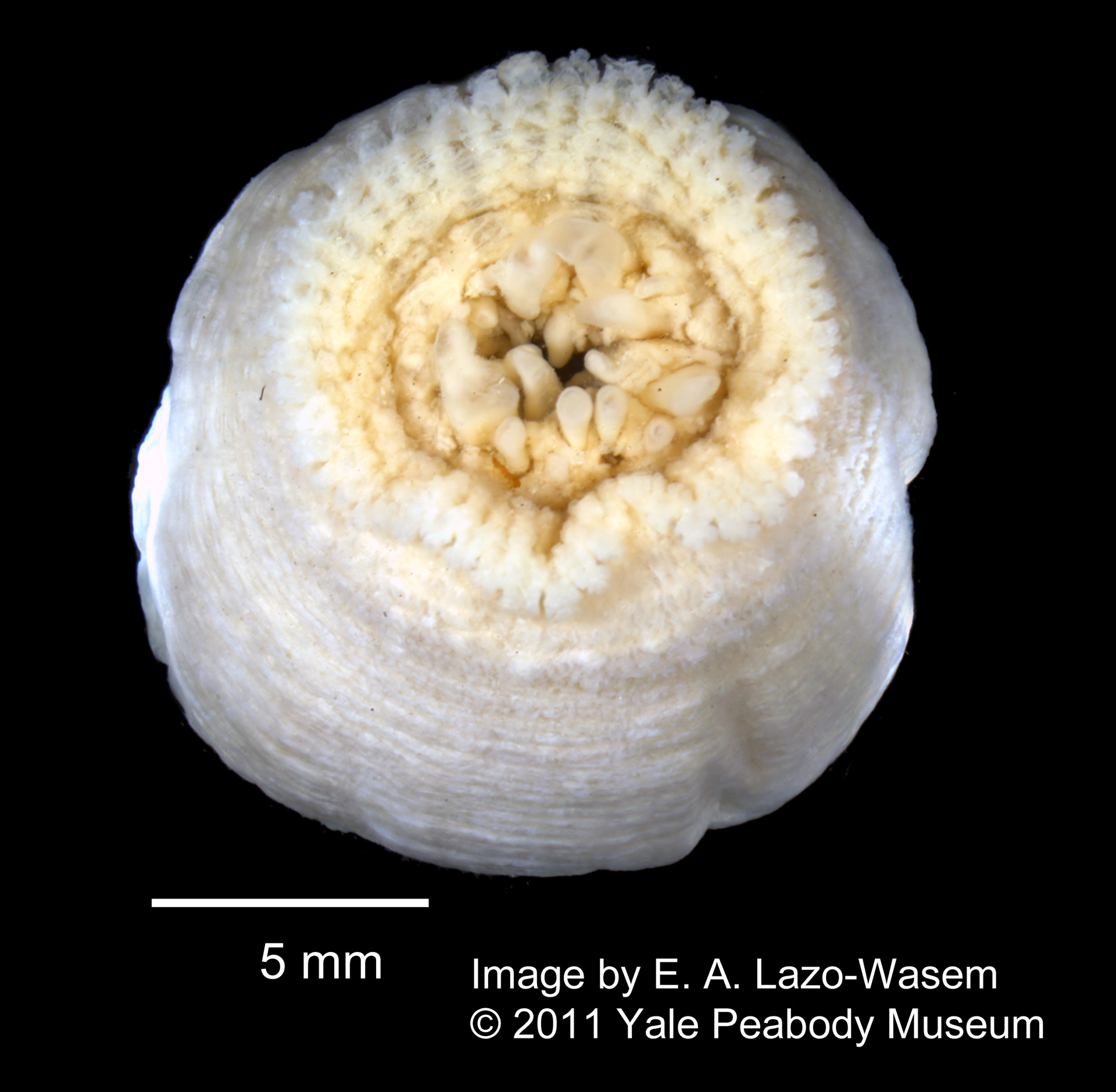
- Asteractis bradleyi

Scientific classification
- Kingdom: Animalia
- Phylum: Cnidaria
- Subphylum: Anthozoa
- Class: Hexacorallia
- Order: Actiniaria
- Family: Actiniidae
- Genus: Actinostella; Duchassaing, 1850

= Actinostella =

Genus of sea anemones

Actinostella is a genus of sea anemones in the family Actiniidae.

== Species ==
The World Register of Marine Species includes these species in the genus:-

- Actinostella bradleyi (Verrill, 1869)
- Actinostella californica (McMurrich, 1893)
- Actinostella cichoracea (Milne Edwards in Haeckel, 1876)
- Actinostella correae (Schlenz & Belém, 1992)
- Actinostella digitata (McMurrich, 1893)
- Actinostella flosculifera (Le Sueur, 1817)
