= Stylobates (cnidarian) =

Scientific classification
- Domain: Eukaryota
- Kingdom: Animalia
- Phylum: Cnidaria
- Subphylum: Anthozoa
- Class: Hexacorallia
- Order: Actiniaria
- Family: Actiniidae
- Genus: Stylobates; Dall, 1903

Genus of sea anemones

Stylobates is a genus of cnidarians belonging to the family Actiniidae.

The species of this genus are found in Pacific Ocean, near Australia.

Species:

- Stylobates aeneus Dall, 1903
- Stylobates birtlesi Crowther, Fautin & Wallace, 2011
- Stylobates calcifer Yoshikawa et al., 2022
- Stylobates cancrisocia (Carlgren, 1928)
- Stylobates loisetteae Fautin, 1987
