= Gyrostoma (cnidarian) =

Scientific classification
- Domain: Eukaryota
- Kingdom: Animalia
- Phylum: Cnidaria
- Subphylum: Anthozoa
- Class: Hexacorallia
- Order: Actiniaria
- Family: Actiniidae
- Genus: Gyrostoma; Kwietniewski, 1897

Genus of sea anemones

Gyrostoma is a genus of cnidarians belonging to the family Actiniidae.

The species of this genus are found in America, Africa.

Species:

- Gyrostoma dubium Carlgren, 1900
- Gyrostoma dysancritum Pax, 1907
- Gyrostoma euchlorum (Hemprich & Ehrenberg, 1834)
- Gyrostoma incertum McMurrich, 1904
- Gyrostoma inequale (McMurrich, 1893)
- Gyrostoma monodi Carlgren, 1927
- Gyrostoma sanctithomae Pax, 1910
- Gyrostoma selkirkii McMurrich, 1904
- Gyrostoma stimpsonii (Fewkes, 1889)
- Gyrostoma triste Carlgren, 1900
- Gyrostoma tulearense Pax, 1909
