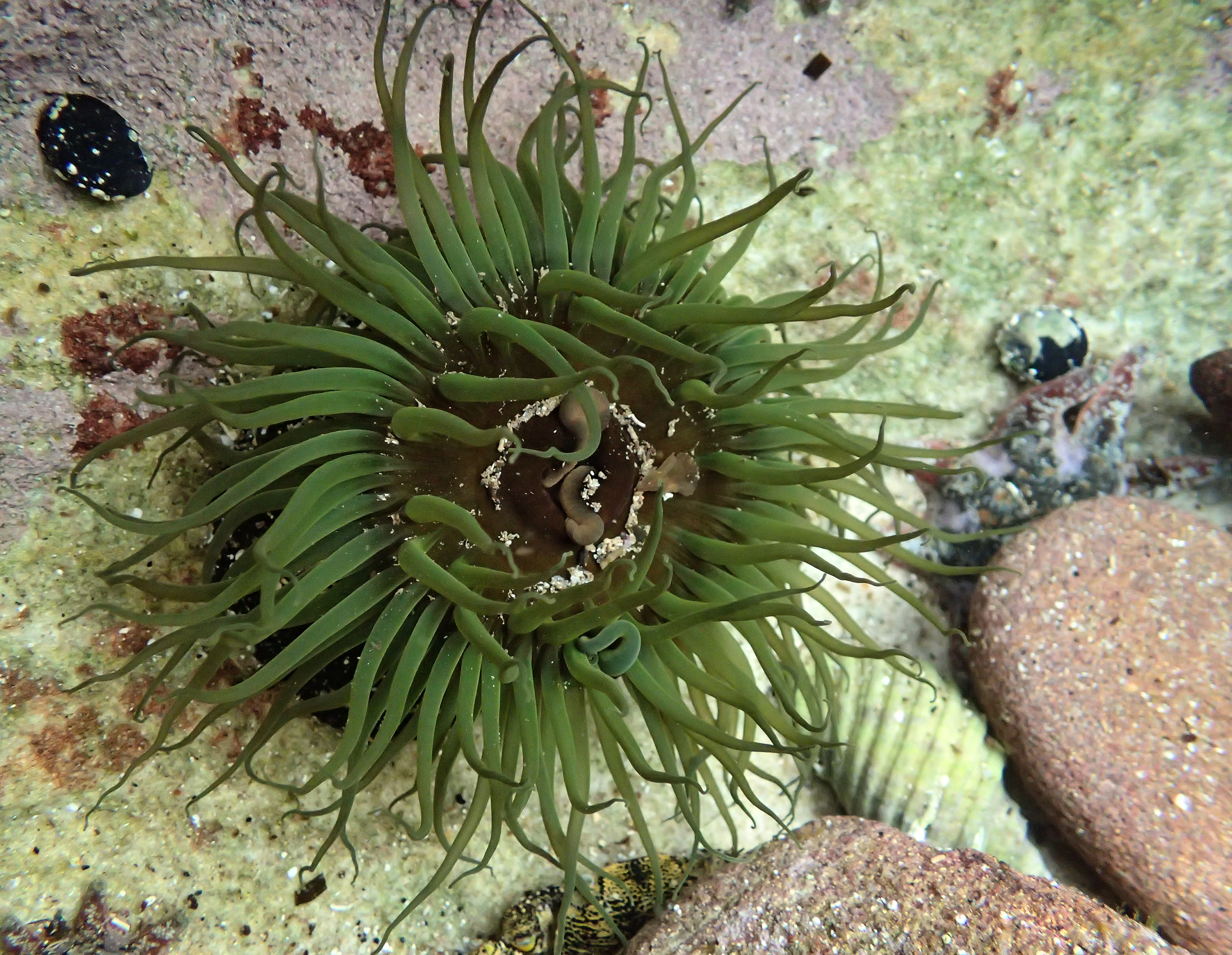
- Aulactinia veratra

Scientific classification
- Kingdom: Animalia
- Phylum: Cnidaria
- Subphylum: Anthozoa
- Class: Hexacorallia
- Order: Actiniaria
- Family: Actiniidae
- Genus: Aulactinia; Verrill, 1864

= Aulactinia =

Genus of sea anemones

Aulactinia is a genus of sea anemones in the family Actiniidae.

== Species ==
Species in the genus include:

- Aulactinia capitata Agassiz in Verril, 1864
- Aulactinia incubans Dunn, Chia & Levine, 1980
- Aulactinia marplatensis (Zamponi, 1977)
- Aulactinia sinensis Li & Liu, 2012
- Aulactinia stella (Verrill, 1864)
- Aulactinia sulcata (Clubb, 1902)
- Aulactinia vancouverensis Sanamyan N., Sanamyan K. & McDaniel, 2013
- Aulactinia veratra (Drayton in Dana, 1846)
- Aulactinia vladimiri Sanamyan N., Sanamyan K. & Bocharova, 2015
