= Actinopsis flava =

Scientific classification
- Domain: Eukaryota
- Kingdom: Animalia
- Phylum: Cnidaria
- Class: Hexacorallia
- Order: Actiniaria
- Family: Actiniidae
- Genus: Actinopsis; Dana, 1856
- Species: A. flava

Binomial name
- Actinopsis flava Danielssen & Koren, 1856

Species of cnidarian

Actinopsis is a monotypic genus of cnidarians belonging to the family Actiniidae. The only species is Actinopsis flava.

The species is found in Europe.
