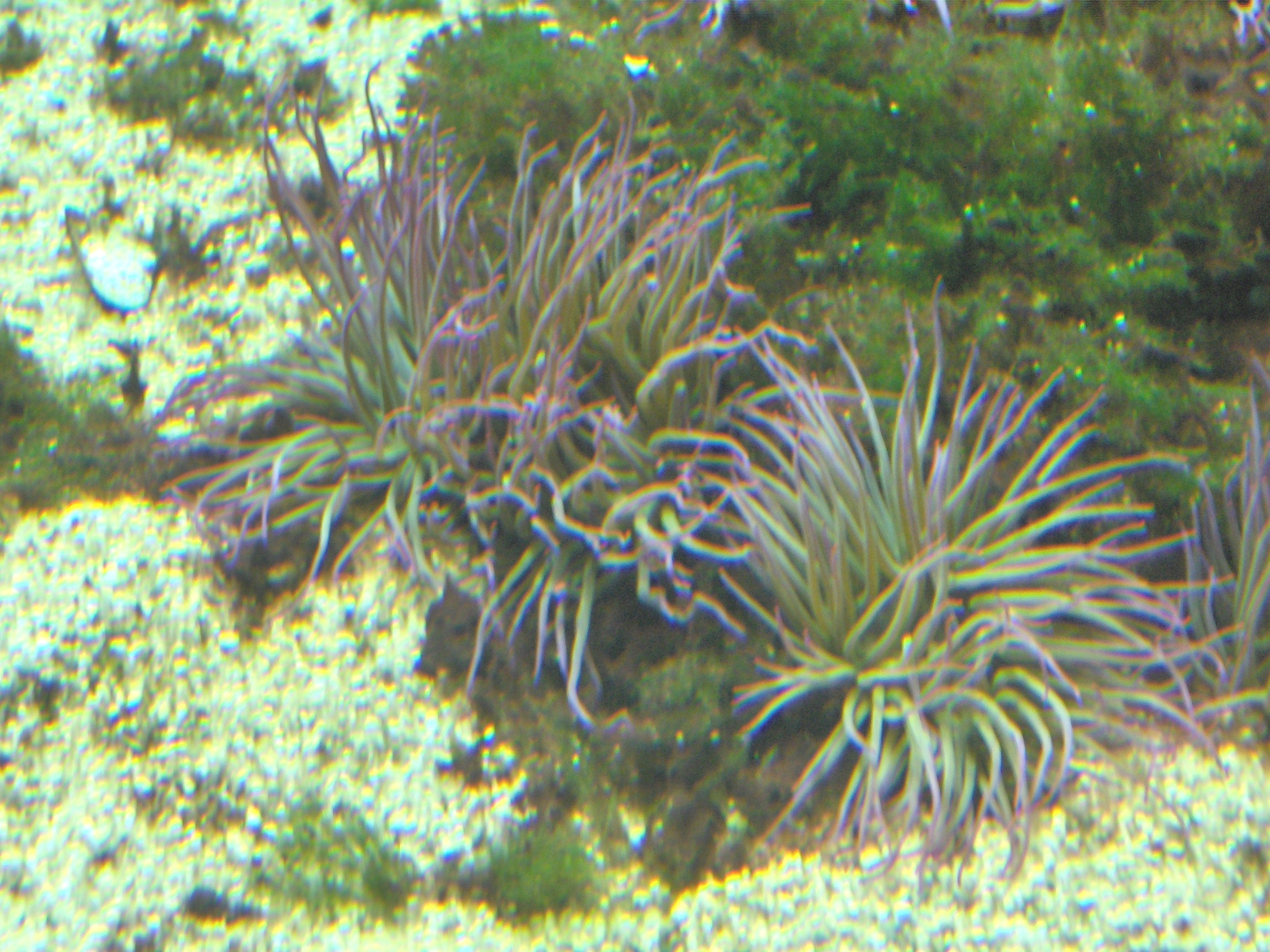
- Anemonia sulcata

Scientific classification
- Kingdom: Animalia
- Phylum: Cnidaria
- Subphylum: Anthozoa
- Class: Hexacorallia
- Order: Actiniaria
- Superfamily: Actinioidea
- Family: Actiniidae; Rafinesque, 1815

Genera
- See text

= Actiniidae =

Family of sea anemones

Actiniidae is the largest family of sea anemones, to which most common, temperate, shore species belong. Most members of this family do not participate in symbioses with fishes. Three exceptions are the bubble-tip anemone (with anemonefish and certain cardinalfish), snakelocks anemone (with Incognito goby) and Urticina piscivora (with painted greenling).

The systematics of Actiniidae is often quite difficult. The problem with identification of genera within this family is that most species are readily distinguishable when alive but when fixated lose their color and some other features. Arrangement of tentacles is important in defining genera for Actiniaria families. There may be one tentacle per space between mesenteries or there may be more than one tentacle between each two mesenteries. Members of the family Actiniidae have one tentacle per space.

== Genera ==
There are over 300 recognized species in 57 genera in Actiniidae. Genera in this family include:

- Actinia Linnaeus, 1767
- Actinioides Haddon & Shackleton, 1893
- Actinopsis Dana, 1856
- Actinostella Duchassaing, 1850
- Anemonia Risso, 1826
- Antheopsis Simon, 1892
- Anthopleura Duchassaing de Fonbressin & Michelotti, 1860
- Anthostella Carlgren, 1938
- Asteractis Verrill, 1869
- Aulactinia Verrill, 1864
- Bolocera Gosse, 1860
- Boloceropsis McMurrich, 1904
- Bunodactis Verril, 1899
- Bunodosoma Verrill, 1899
- Cancrisocia Stimpson, 1856
- Cladactella Verrill, 1928
- Condylactis Duchassaing de Fombressin & Michelotti, 1864
- Cribrina Hemprich & Ehrenberg in Ehrenberg, 1834
- Cribrinopsis Carlgren, 1922
- Dofleinia Wassilieff, 1908
- Entacmaea Ehrenberg, 1834
- Epiactis Verrill, 1869
- Glyphoperidium Roule, 1909
- Gyractis Boveri, 1893
- Gyrostoma Kwietniewski, 1898
- Henactis Rodríguez, 2012
- Isactinia Carlgren, 1900
- Isanemonia Carlgren, 1950
- Isantheopsis Carlgren, 1942
- Isoaulactinia Belém, Herrera & Schlenz, 1996
- Isosicyonis Carlgren, 1927
- Isotealia Carlgren, 1899
- Korsaranthus Riemann-Zurneck, 1999
- Leipsiceras Stephenson, 1918
- Macrodactyla Haddon, 1898
- Mesactinia England, 1987
- Myonanthus McMurrich, 1893
- Neoparacondylactis Zamponi, 1974
- Onubactis Lopez-Gonzalez, den Hartog & Garcia-Gomez, 1995
- Oulactis Milne Edwards & Haime, 1851
- Parabunodactis Carlgren, 1928
- Paracondylactis Carlgren, 1934
- Paranemonia Carlgren, 1900
- Parantheopsis McMurrich, 1904
- Paratealia Mathew & Kurian, 1979
- Phialoba Carlgren, 1951
- Phlyctenactis Stuckey, 1909
- Phlyctenanthus Carlgren, 1950
- Phymactis Milne Edwards, 1857
- Phymanthea
- Pseudactinia Carlgren, 1928
- Spheractis England, 1992
- Stylobates Dall, 1903
- Synantheopsis England, 1992
- Tealianthus Carlgren, 1927
- Urticina Ehrenberg, 1834
- Urticinopsis Carlgren, 1927
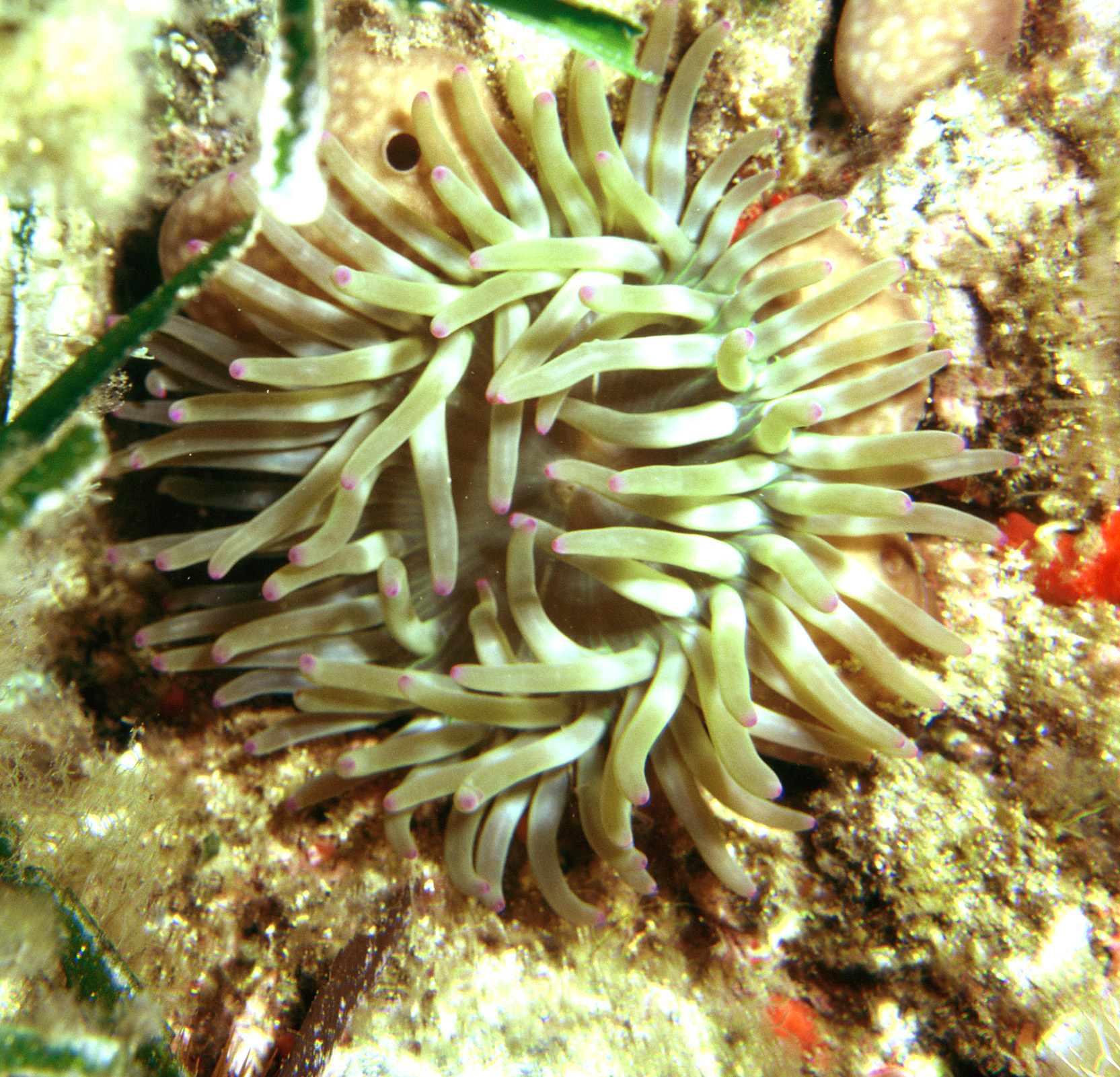
Condylactis sp.

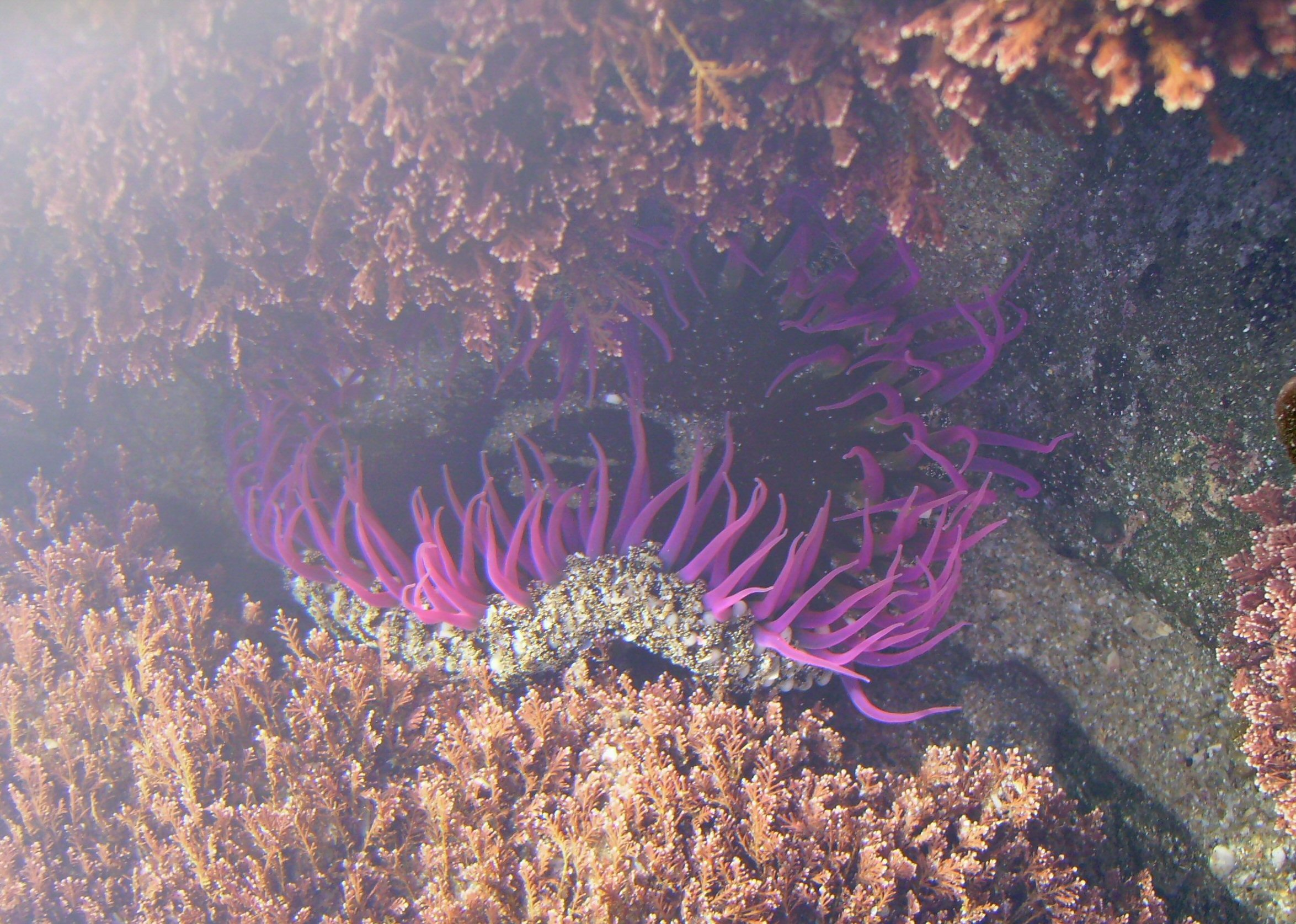
Isocradactis magna, Pakiri Beach, New Zealand

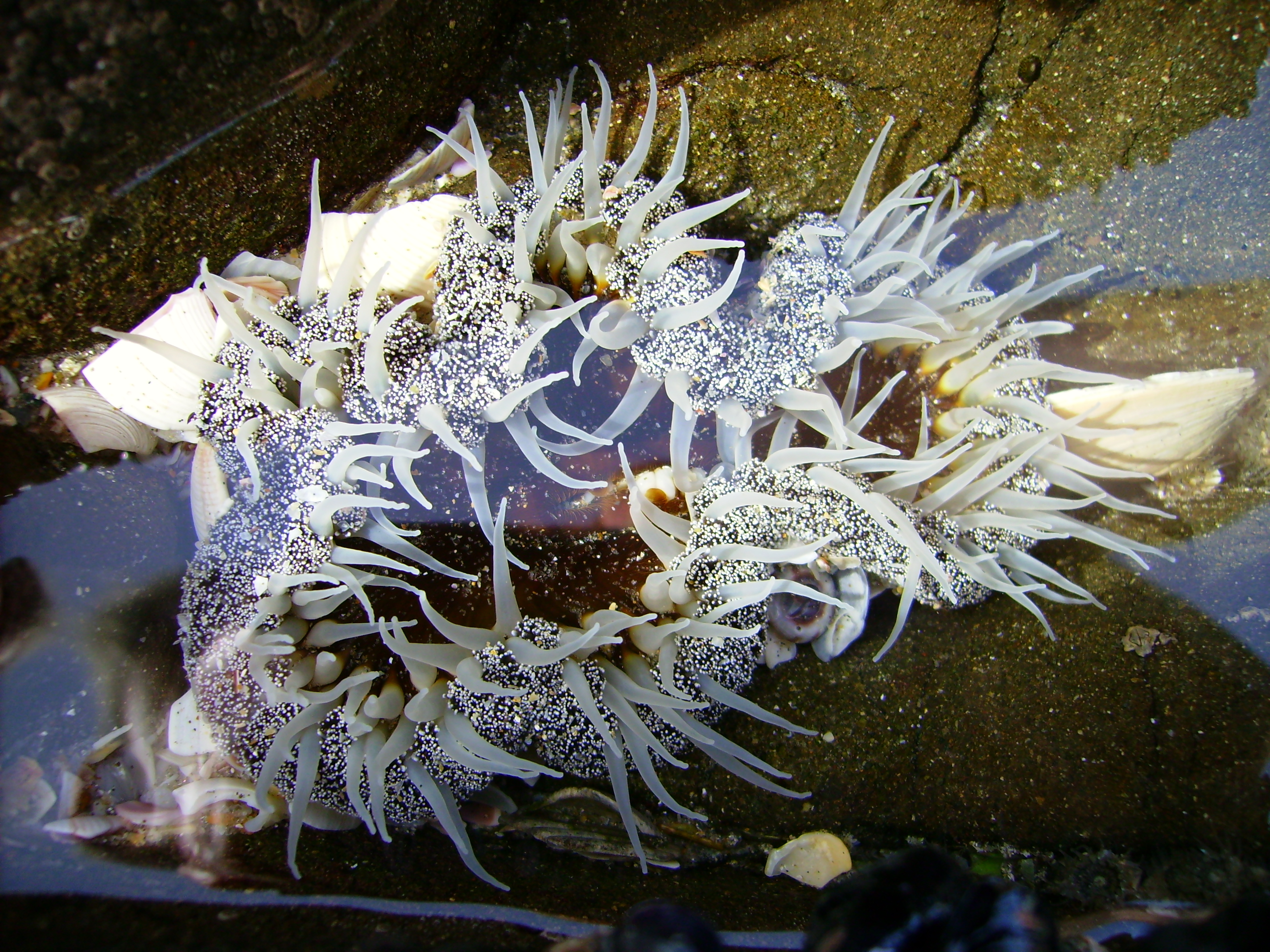
Isocradactis magna, Pakiri Beach, New Zealand
