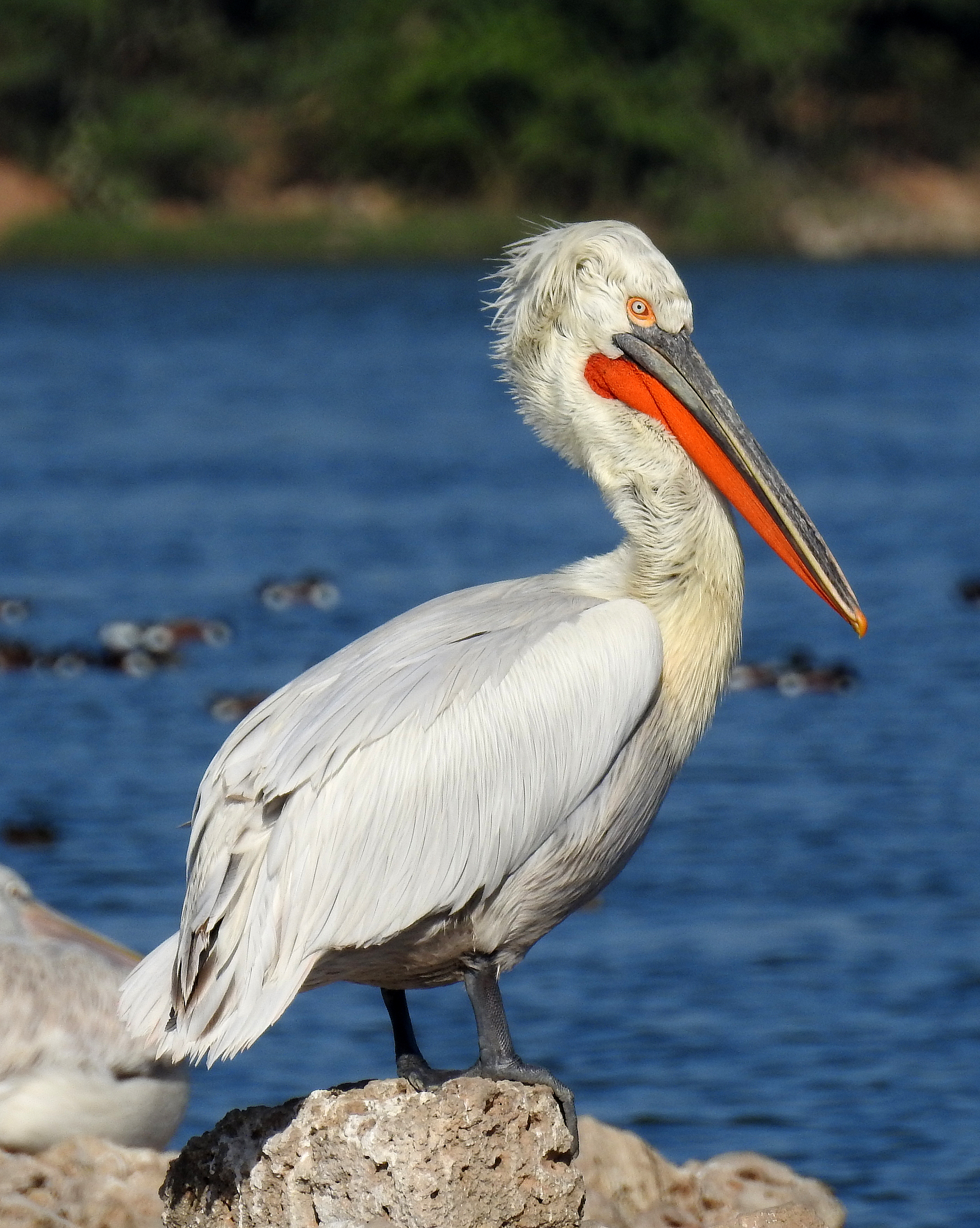
- Dalmatian pelican, Porbandar, Gujarat, India

Conservation status
- Near Threatened (IUCN 3.1)
- CITES Appendix I

Scientific classification
- Kingdom: Animalia
- Phylum: Chordata
- Class: Aves
- Order: Pelecaniformes
- Family: Pelecanidae
- Genus: Pelecanus
- Species: P. crispus

Binomial name
- Pelecanus crispus Bruch, 1832
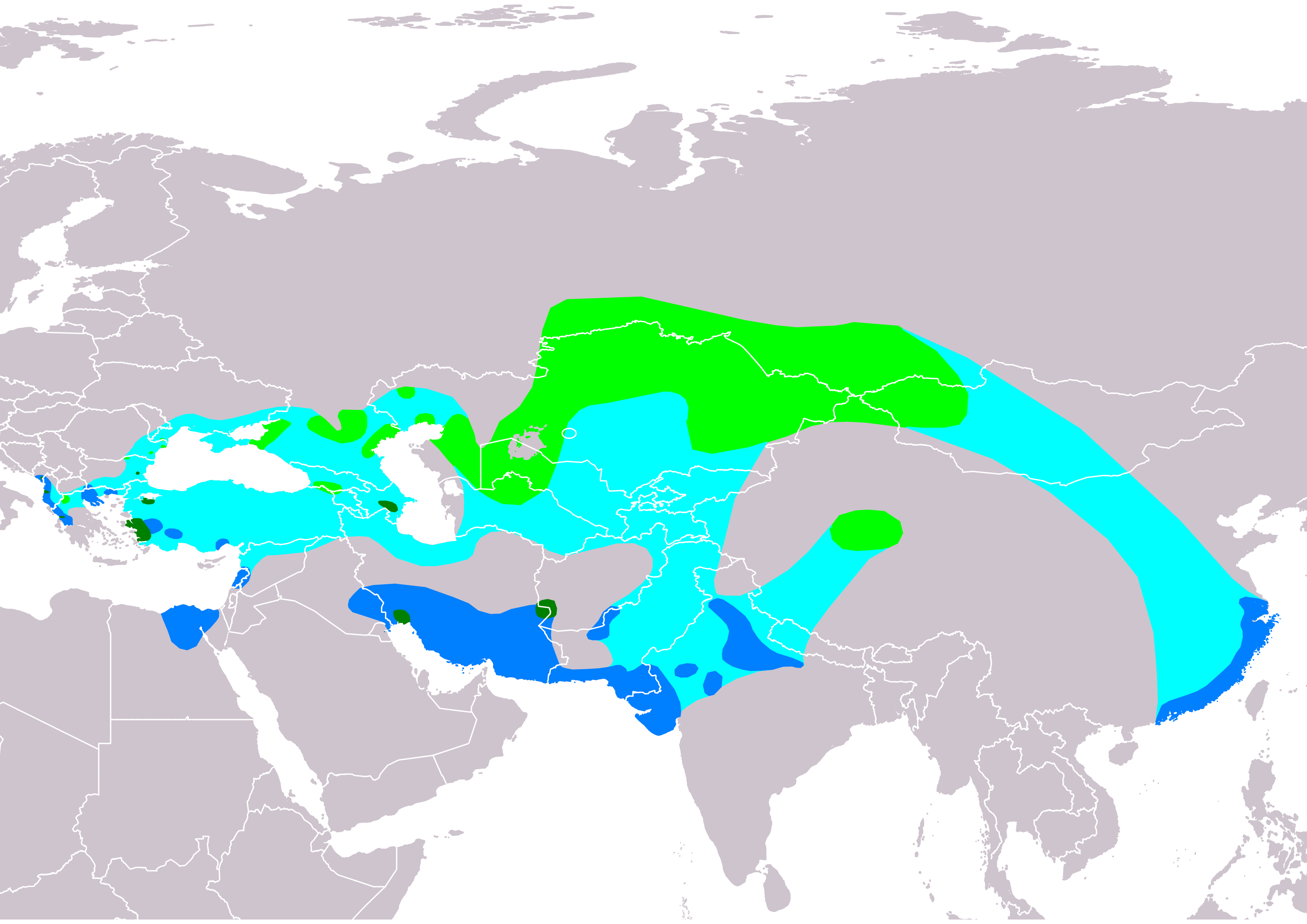
- Distribution map of Dalmatian pelican Breeding Resident Non-breeding Passage

= Dalmatian pelican =

Species of bird

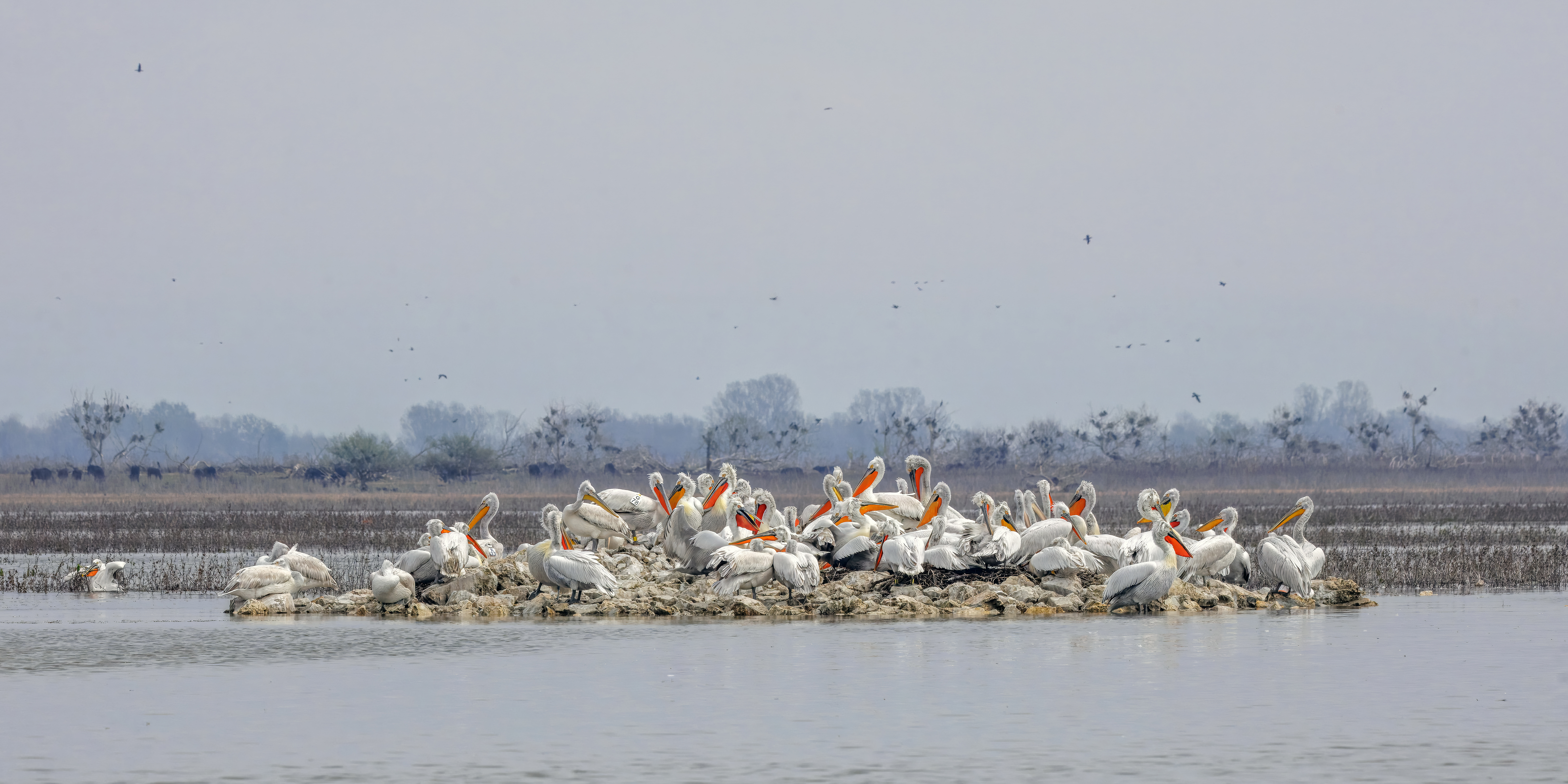
roost on Lake Kerkini, Greece

The Dalmatian pelican (Pelecanus crispus), also known as the curly-headed pelican, is the largest member of the pelican family and among the heaviest flying birds in the world. With a wingspan typically ranging between 2.7 and 3.2 metres (8 ft 10 in and 10 ft 6 in), it ranks among the largest soaring birds. These pelicans are known for their graceful flight and often travel in synchronised flocks. With a range spanning across much of Central Eurasia, from the eastern Mediterranean in the west to the Taiwan Strait in the east, and from the Persian Gulf in the south to Siberia in the north, it is a short-to-medium-distance migrant between breeding and overwintering areas.

As with other pelicans, its diet is mainly fish, and the males are larger than the females. Its curly nape feathers, grey legs and silvery-white plumage are distinguishing features, and the wings appear solid grey in flight. The adults acquire a drabber plumage in winter, however, making them look more similar to the great white pelican. Its harsh vocalizations become more pronounced during the mating season. It breeds across the Palearctic from southeastern Europe to Russia, India and China in swamps and shallow lakes. It usually returns to traditional breeding sites, where it is less social than other pelican species. Its nests are crude heaps of vegetation, which are placed on islands or dense mats of vegetation.

The species' numbers dramatically declined during the 20th century, partly due to land use, disturbance and poaching activities. The core population survives in Russia, but in its Mongolian range, it is critically endangered. Removal of power lines to prevent bird strike or electrocution and constructing nesting platforms or rafts have reversed declines locally.

== Taxonomy and evolution ==
=== Original description ===
In 1832, Carl Friedrich Bruch described the Dalmatian Pelican (Pelecanus crispus), naming it the "Curly-headed Pelican" (with crispus meaning "curly" in Latin) (Note: The species epithet crispus, meaning "curly" or "wavy" in Latin, was assigned by Carl Friedrich Bruch in 1832, in reference to the Dalmatian pelican's ruffled nape feathers, especially prominent during the breeding season. While the feathers are not "curly" in the strict morphological sense—as defined in recent studies using parameters such as contour count, pitch, and stretch ratio in curled fibers—the term crispus was likely a well-chosen epithet. Alternative Latin descriptors such as crinitus or capillatus would have implied long or hair-like plumage, which does not accurately describe the species. Thus, Bruch's use of crispus reflects a balance between the aesthetic naturalist tradition of the early 19th century and the limitations of classical descriptive language available to taxonomists at the time. The term is also scientifically reasonable, given other species named crispus—such as Chondrus crispus—that do not exhibit spiral curls but rather irregular or ruffled surfaces. Among avian species, truly curled feather morphologies occur in birds like the curl-crested aracari (Pteroglossus beauharnaesii) and the crested guineafowl (Guttera pucherani), in which the feather barbs themselves form spirals or crimped structures. Compared to those, the Dalmatian pelican's crest is better understood as irregular or tousled; however, crispus remains an appropriate descriptor when understood within the linguistic conventions and taxonomic practices of Bruch's time.) and referring to it in German as "Krausköpfiger Pelekan". He based his description on two wild-shot specimens: an adult female from Dalmatia and a likely younger bird from Cairo. Bruch distinguished the species from P. onocrotalus by its fully feathered head, shorter webbing, and silkier plumage, noting that the curly crest appears in both juveniles and adults.

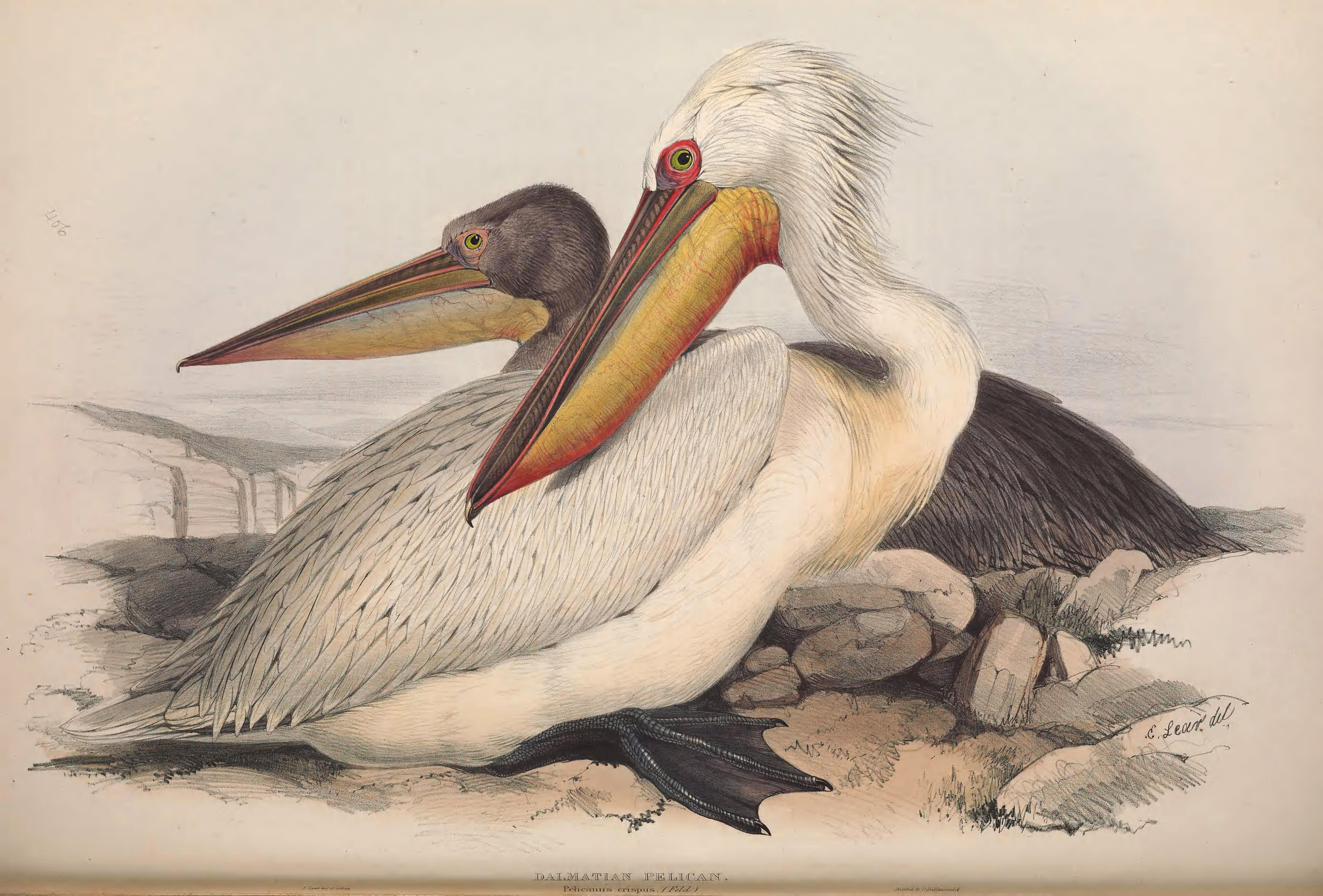
Edward Lear's hand-coloured lithograph of a Dalmatian Pelican (1837). Pencil and watercolour.

The first known illustration of the species was of the individual shot in Cairo and was created by the German naturalist and artist Heinrich von Kittlitz. However, this illustration is not currently accessible to the public. A second and more widely known illustration appeared as a plate in The Birds of Europe by John Gould. Remarkably, this artwork was produced by Edward Lear, a renowned 19th-century artist and poet best known for his nonsense literature.

=== Relationship with the spot-billed pelican P. phillipensis ===
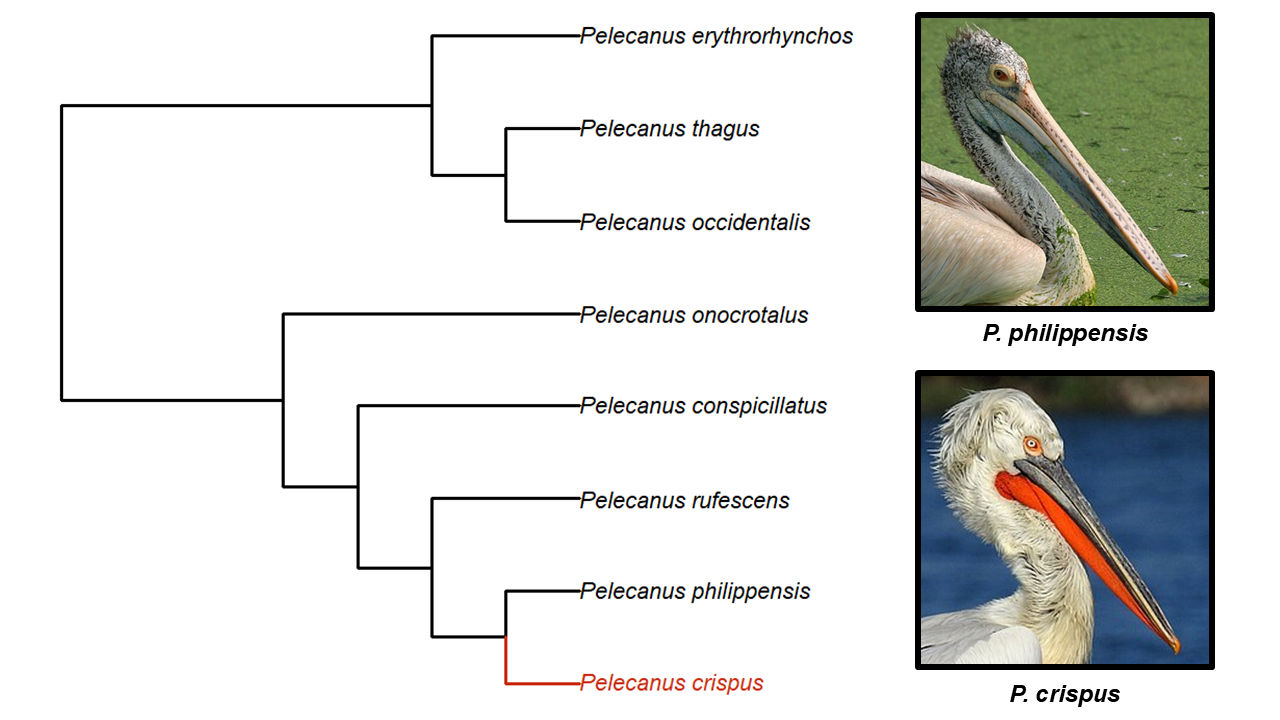
Phylogenetic relationship of the Dalmatian pelican (P. cripus; in red), based on the phylogenetic structure. The division between P. crispus and P. philippensis is highlighted by placing two images next to the phylogeny, showing the morphological differences between them.

During the 20th century, some authors suggested that the Dalmatian pelican could be a northern subspecies of the spot-billed pelican (Pelecanus philippensis), based on supposed minor morphological similarities. However, this view appeared in only a few publications and has not been widely accepted by the scientific community.

Several lines of evidence support the recognition of P. crispus and P. philippensis as distinct species. First, their breeding ranges do not overlap: P. crispus is found across southeastern Europe and Central Asia, while P. philippensis is restricted to South and Southeast Asia. They also differ markedly in nesting behaviour; P. crispus nests on the ground, while P. philippensis nests colonially in trees, a relatively rare strategy among pelicans. Furthermore, the two species exhibit differences in sexually selected traits: P. crispus develops a bright red gular pouch during the breeding season, whereas P. philippensis retains a pale pouch year-round and displays distinctive dark spots on the bill, which are absent in P. crispus and likely function in mate signalling.

Evidence of behavioural reproductive isolation also comes from a captive mixed-species colony at the Berlin Zoo, where P. crispus and P. philippensis were housed together but did not interbreed, despite the presence of hybrid pairings among other pelican species. Finally, a 2013 molecular phylogenetic analysis based on mitochondrial and nuclear DNA confirmed that P. crispus and P. philippensis represent distinct evolutionary lineages. The divergence between the two species has been estimated at 0.7 million years ago, during the Chibanian (Middle Pleistocene).

=== Proposed extinct subspecies ===
In 1941, Soviet ornithologist P.V. Serebrovsky proposed the existence of an extinct fossil subspecies of the Dalmatian pelican, Pelecanus crispus palaeocrispus, based on Pleistocene remains found at the Binagadi tar pits in present-day Azerbaijan. Nonetheless, the subspecies is not formally accepted by international taxonomic authorities.

== Description ==
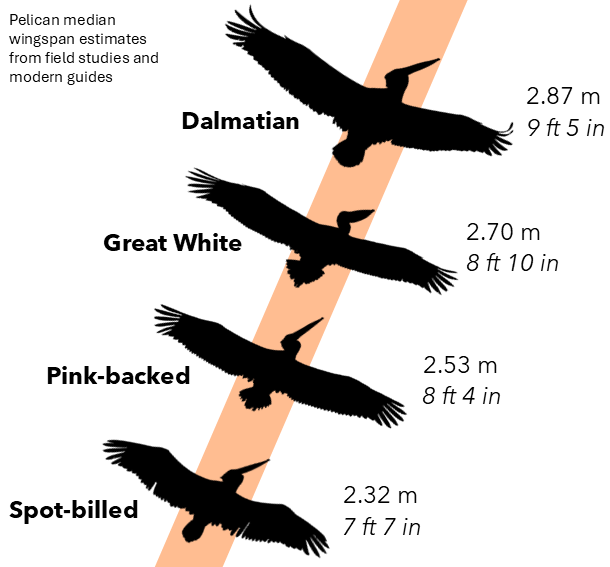
Comparison of the median wingspans of pelican species overlapping with the Dalmatian pelican's distribution. The diagram illustrates the size difference between the Dalmatian pelican and other sympatric pelicans, highlighting its status as the largest pelican species. Median wingspans are based on field measurements and modern standard guides.

The Dalmatian pelican is the largest of all pelican species and one of the heaviest flying birds in the world, with a body length of 1.6–1.8 m (5 ft 3 in – 5 ft 11 in), a wingspan typically ranging between 2.7–3.2 m (8 ft 10 in – 10 ft 6 in). (Note: Field measurements conducted by Korodi-Gál (1962) on 12 wild individuals from the Danube Delta recorded wingspans ranging from 254 to 308 cm, with a median value around 294 cm. Later sources, such as Seabirds: An Identification Guide (1983), Birds of Europe (2008) and Birds of the World (2020), report larger wingspan figures of 310 to 345 cm, although these publications do not specify their measurement methods, and it is likely that such figures reflect stretched specimens or non-standardized protocols. More recently, the Collins Bird Guide (2023), and other bird guides, which rely on measurements from museum skins and photographic evidence without artificially stretching the wings, reported a typical wingspan range of 270 to 320 cm. While wingspans up to 345 cm cannot be entirely ruled out, the most reliable data based on standard museum measurements and field observations suggest that the true wingspan of wild Dalmatian pelicans generally falls between 254 and 320 cm. Caution is therefore advised when interpreting the larger historical estimates.), and an average weight of about 9.5 kg (21 lb).

The species is most easily recognised by its enormous bill, which typically measures between 37 and 45 cm (15 and 18 in) long and includes a large pouch used for catching fish. This makes it the bird species with the second longest bill, only surpassed by the Australian pelican (Pelecanus conspicillatus), whose bill length ranges from 34.6 to 50 cm (13.6 to 19.7 in). (Note: This ranking refers to absolute bill length. If bill length relative to body size is considered, the sword-billed hummingbird (Ensifera ensifera) holds the record, as its bill can be longer than its body.) During the breeding season, this pouch becomes a vivid orange-red, contrasting with the more subdued yellow or grey tones observed during the rest of the year. The upper mandible remains greyish throughout, often with a slight orange tip.

The Dalmatian pelican has silvery-white plumage, which may appear more grey or creamy, especially in winter. A distinguishing feature is the presence of a shaggy crest of curly feathers on the nape and back of the head, giving the bird a notably unkempt appearance compared to the smooth-headed great white pelican (Pelecanus onocrotalus). The legs are dark grey, another feature that helps separate it from related species with pinkish legs.

While generally a quiet species, the Dalmatian pelican may produce deep, guttural grunts, hisses, or barking sounds during the breeding season. Juveniles are overall greyer and duller in appearance, with less distinctive crests and darker plumage, but gradually acquire the characteristic silvery-white plumage as they mature.

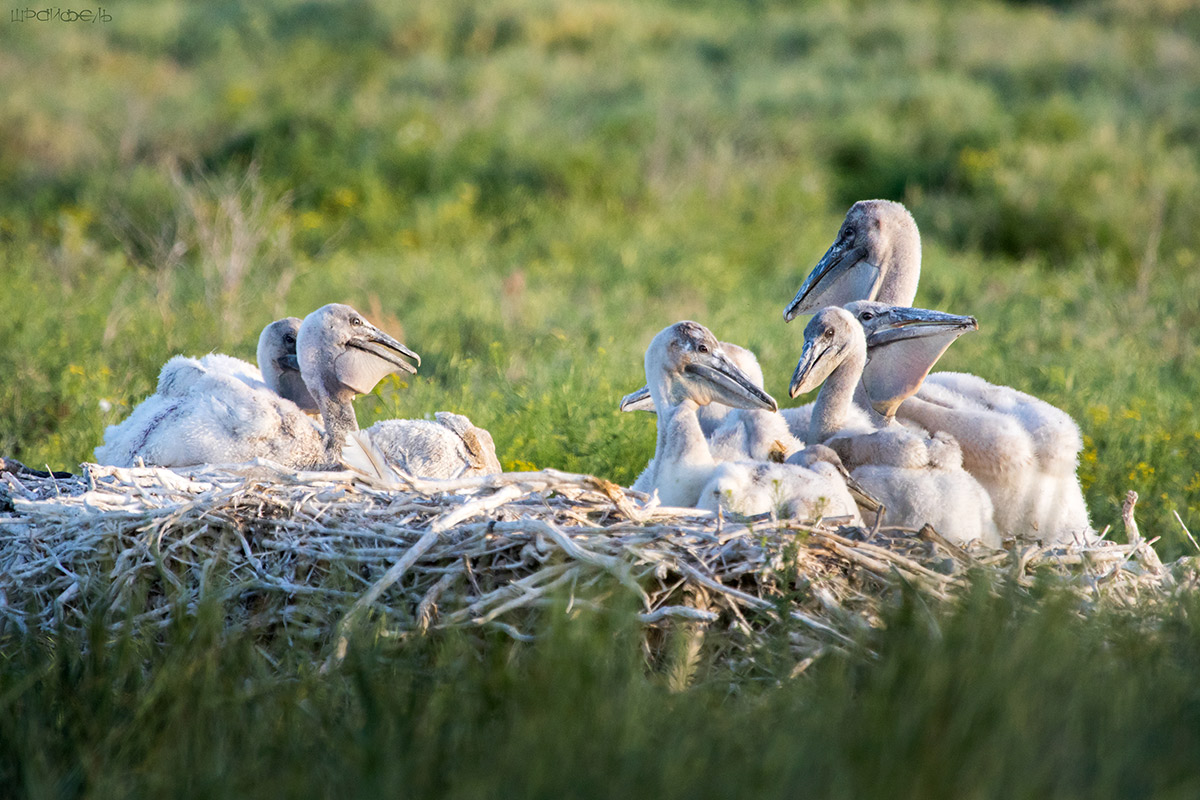
Chicks of the Dalmatian pelican at the Rostov Nature Reserve.

== Distribution and habitat ==
Historically, the Dalmatian pelican was far more widespread across Europe than it is today. Subfossil remains dating back to the Holocene climatic optimum, approximately 7400 to 5000 years BP have been found as far north as Denmark. Additional remains dated to 1900–600 BP have been uncovered in central Europe, the Netherlands, and Great Britain. These finds suggest that the species once ranged across much of the continent during periods of warmer climate.

Present breeding colonies (orange) of the Dalmatian pelican and the geographic position of the subfossil pelican records (blue).

Currently, the Dalmatian pelican is widely distributed across southeastern Europe, Central Asia, and the Indian subcontinent, inhabiting large, open wetlands such as lakes, rivers, deltas, estuaries, and floodplains. Unlike the great white pelican, which remains mostly in lowlands, the Dalmatian pelican nests at various elevations and is more philopatric, typically returning to the same traditional breeding sites unless they become unsuitable due to disturbance or degradation. During the non-breeding season, the Dalmatian pelican seeks out ice-free inland waters, such as large lakes in Europe or temporary wetlands known as jheels in India, which provide essential foraging and resting habitat. As global temperatures rise and such habitats become more widely available or persist longer into the year, there is growing evidence that the species is gradually expanding its range, responding to increasingly favorable environmental conditions.

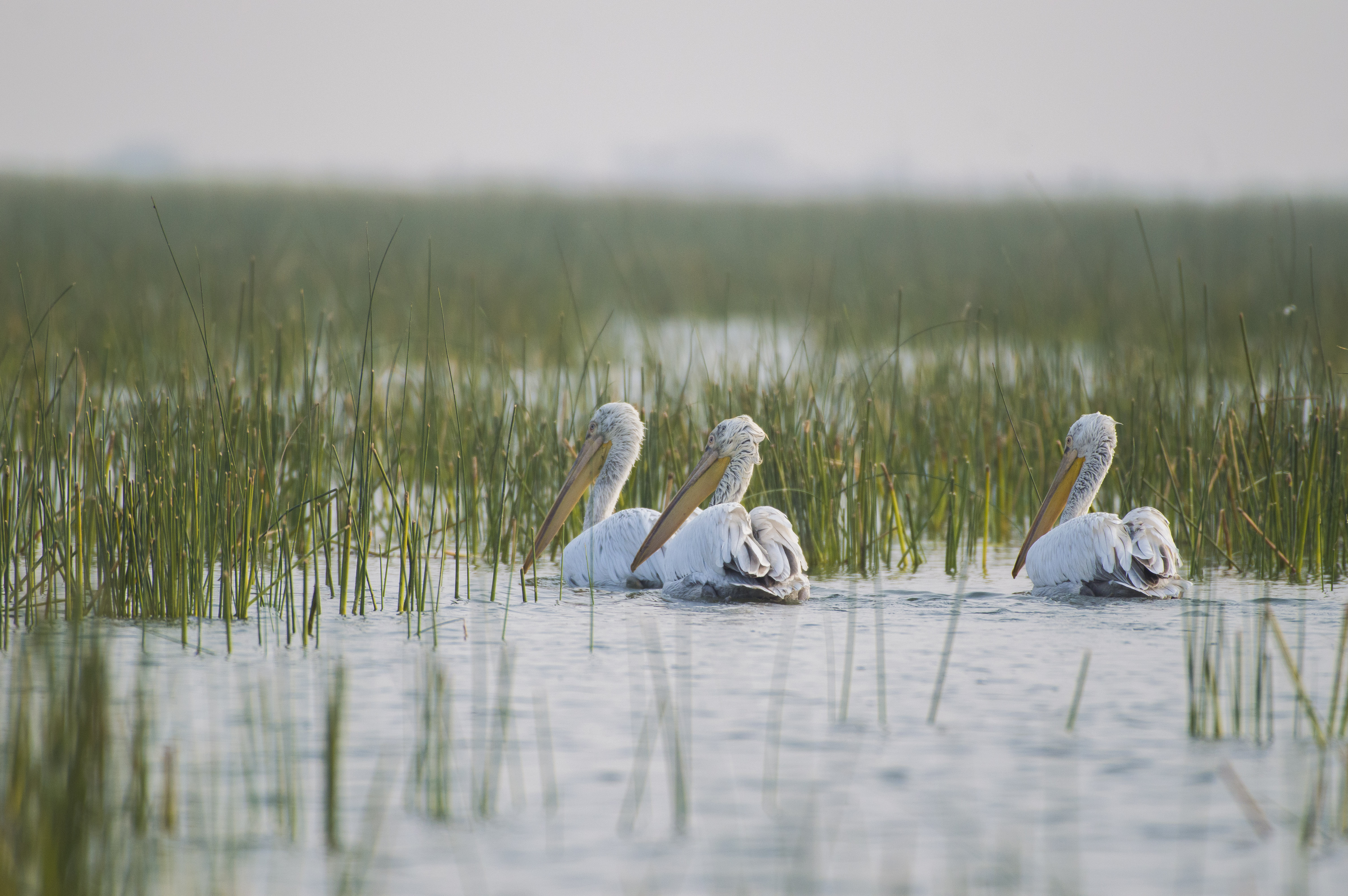
Dalmatian pelicans swimming in coordination at the Nal Sarovar Bird Sanctuary, India.

=== Current populations and breeding sites ===
The global population of the Dalmatian pelican is estimated at between 10,000 and 20,000 individuals, with roughly 3,000 to 5,000 breeding pairs. Although the species suffered dramatic declines during the 20th century, several strongholds remain. The largest known breeding colony is found at Small Prespa Lake, which is shared between Greece and Albania and supports around 1,600 pairs. Another significant population persists in the Danube Delta, with approximately 450 pairs recorded there.

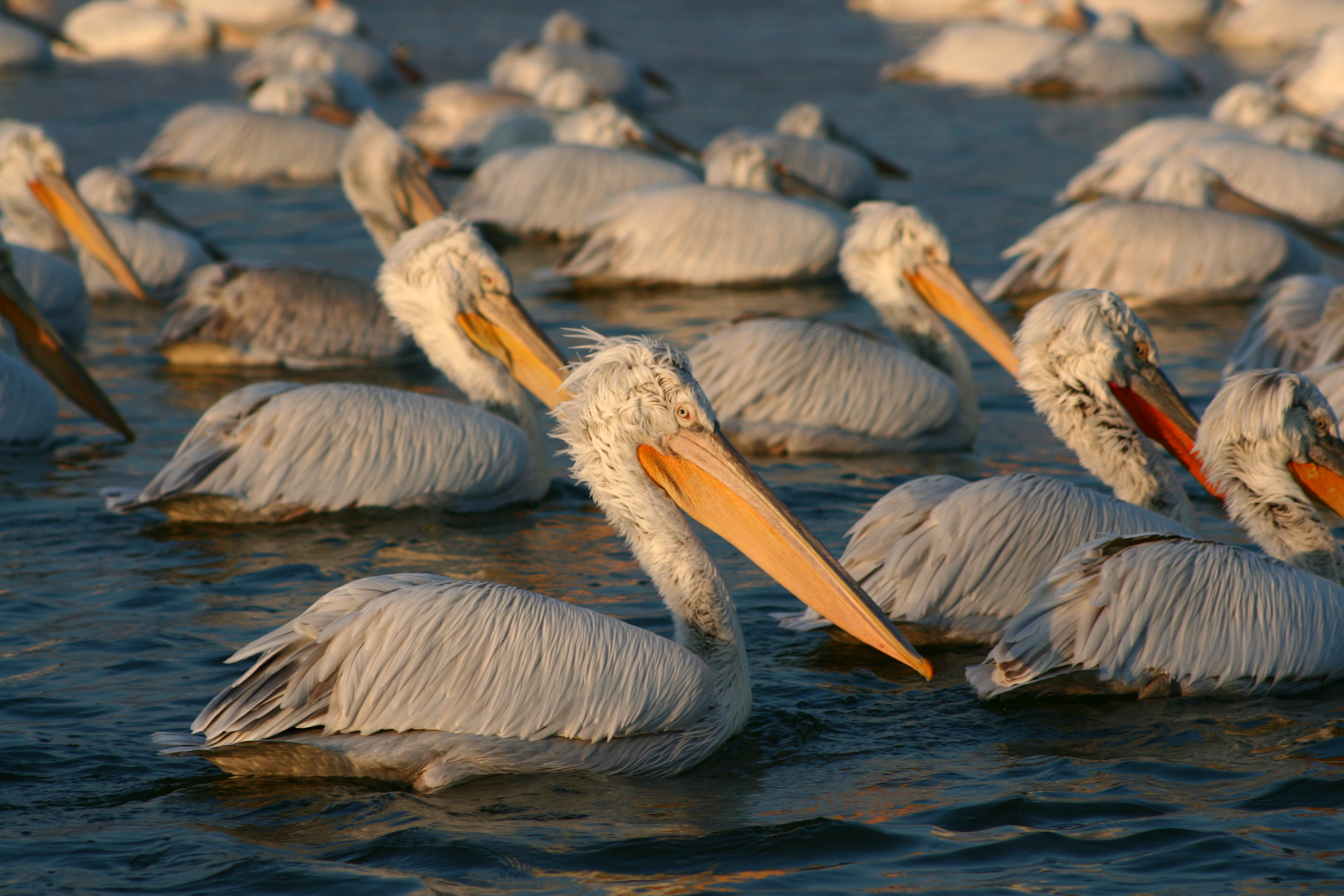
Dalmatian pelican flock in Lake Kerkini, Macedonia, Greece.

Russia now hosts the largest breeding population of the Dalmatian pelican, with estimates exceeding 3,000 pairs, representing about 70% of all breeding individuals worldwide. In the southern Tyumen region of Russia, the only known breeding site is Lake Tenis, where Dalmatian pelicans nest on reed islets. Other active breeding sites are scattered across southeastern Europe, including regions in Ukraine, North Macedonia, Romania, Bulgaria—particularly the Srebarna Nature Reserve—and Albania, where Karavasta Lagoon serves as a key nesting site. Although the species was considered extinct in Croatia since the 1950s, a lone Dalmatian pelican was observed there in 2011.

== Movements ==
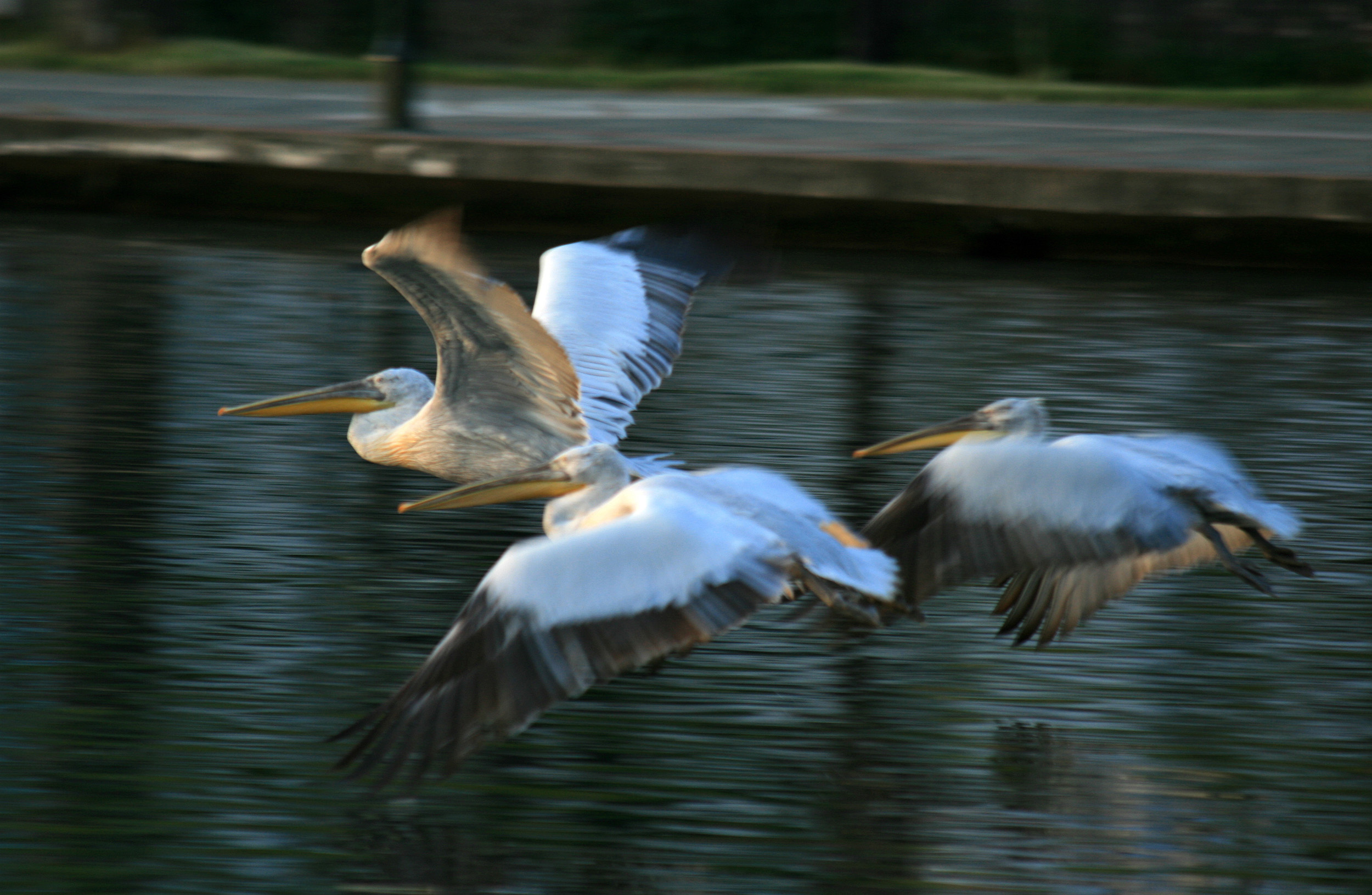
Dalmatian pelicans in flight at Lake Orestiada, Greece.

The Dalmatian pelican is a partial migrant, and its movement patterns vary significantly across its range. In Europe, many populations are dispersive rather than fully migratory, with individuals often remaining near their breeding sites year-round or making only short-distance movements to the Mediterranean basin in winter. For example, in the Danube Delta, birds typically arrive in March and leave by the end of August, reflecting a predictable seasonal pattern aligned with breeding and food availability.

By contrast, populations in Asia undertake more substantial migration. Pelicans breeding in southern Russia generally migrate to the central Middle East for the winter, with many wintering in wetlands across Iran and extending through the Indian subcontinent, reaching as far south as Sri Lanka and westward into Nepal and central India. Mongolian-breeding birds follow a different route, traveling to the east coast of China, including areas around Hong Kong, to spend the winter months.

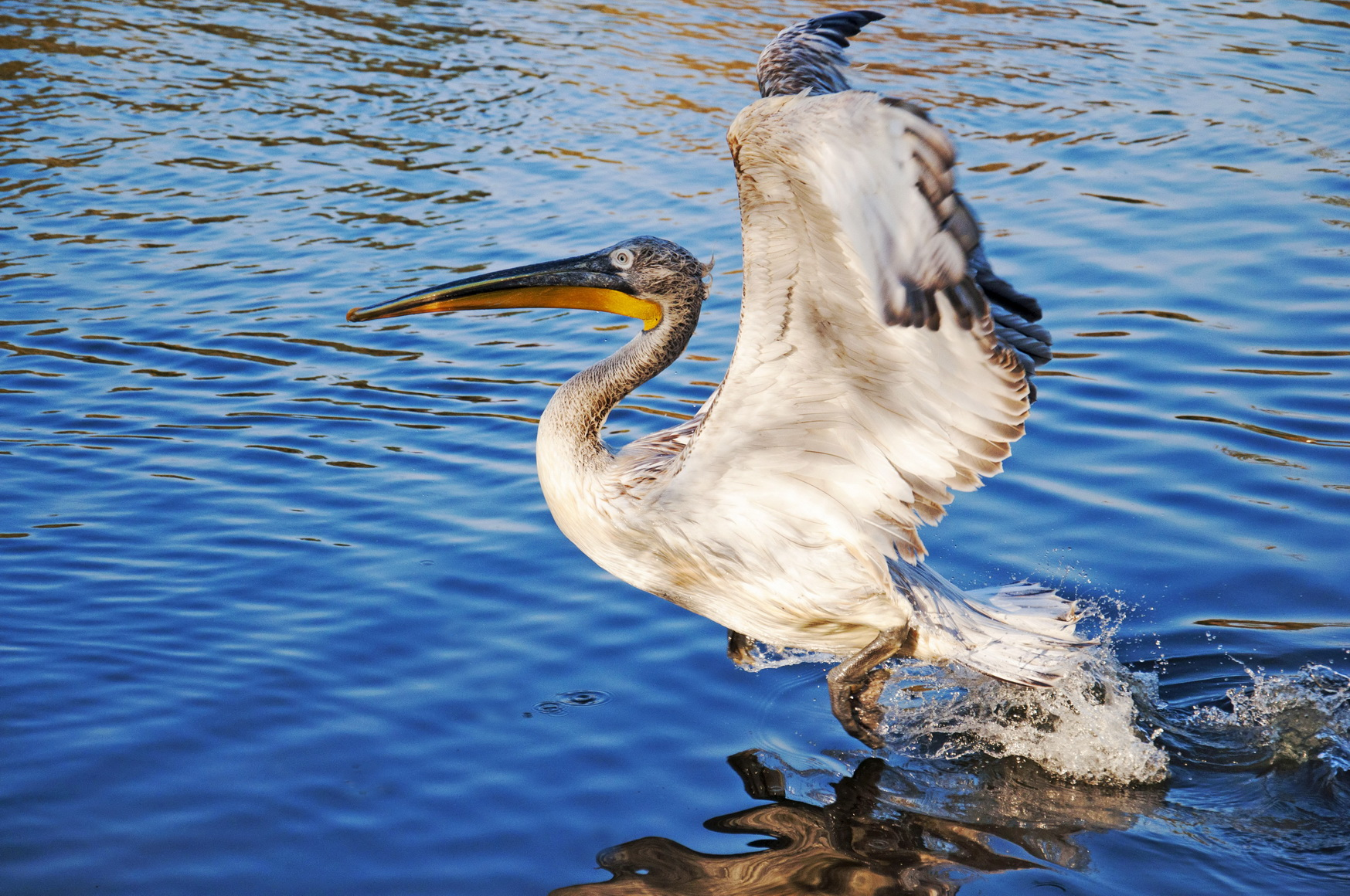
The takeoff from water of the Dalmatian Pelican is energetic, requiring strong pushes with both feet and heavy flapping.

In flight, the Dalmatian pelican is striking: it soars with slow, powerful wingbeats, neck pulled back in a characteristic "S" shape similar to a heron. The wings are broad and pale greyish-white, with noticeable black tips on the primaries. This bird often flies in synchronized groups, gliding gracefully and silently above lakes and wetlands.

Takeoff from water is particularly energetic. The pelican requires strong pushes with both feet and heavy flapping of its broad wings to become airborne, especially when carrying a full pouch of fish.

== Feeding ecology ==
The Dalmatian pelican is a piscivorous, non-apex predator, functionally classified as an opportunistic secondary-to-tertiary consumer. It forages across freshwater, brackish, and coastal ecosystems, primarily during crepuscular hours, using shallow-water surface capture techniques. Its trophic role positions it as a top-level vertebrate consumer, but below strict apex predators due to its limited prey diversity and lack of intra-guild predation.

=== Diet composition ===
They predominantly consume fish from freshwater, brackish, and marine environments. Most of these are small to medium-sized fish; large enough to justify the effort of capture but small enough to be swallowed whole, as pelicans do not tear or chew their prey.

Additionally, the species they prey on tend to form schools or shoals, are often benthic, and exhibit slow movements. These traits facilitate collective predation. Such preferences are typical of visual predators that forage in groups or in clear waters. Below are examples of prey species recorded in its diet:

Freshwater species
- Cyprinus carpio — Common carp
- Leuciscus idus — Ide
- Perca fluviatilis — European perch
- Esox lucius — Northern pike
- Scardinius erythrophthalmus — Rudd
- Rutilus rutilus — Roach
- Abramis brama — Bream
- Blicca bjoerkna — White bream
- Alburnus belvica — Endemic to Balkan lakes
- Sabanejewia caspia — Benthic spined loach
- Anguilla anguilla — European eel (catadromous)
Brackish and coastal species
- Gobius spp. — Gobies
- Neogobius spp. — Gobies
- Gobius bucchichi — Bucchich's goby
- Atherina spp. — Sand smelts
- Belone belone — Garfish
Euryhaline / transitional species
- Pungitius pungitius — Nine-spined stickleback
- Mugil spp. — Mullets

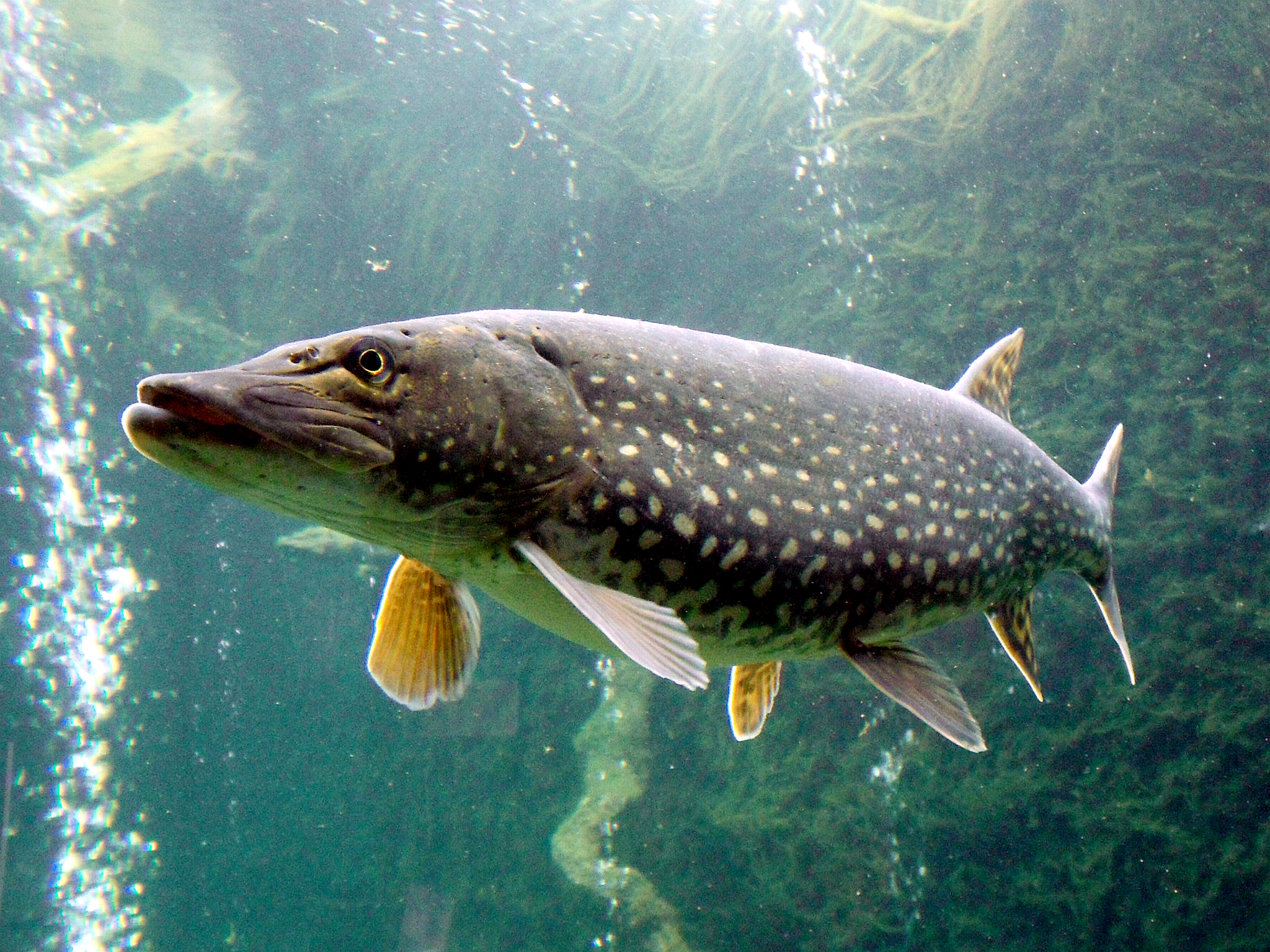
Northern Pike (Esox lucius), a large predatory freshwater fish.

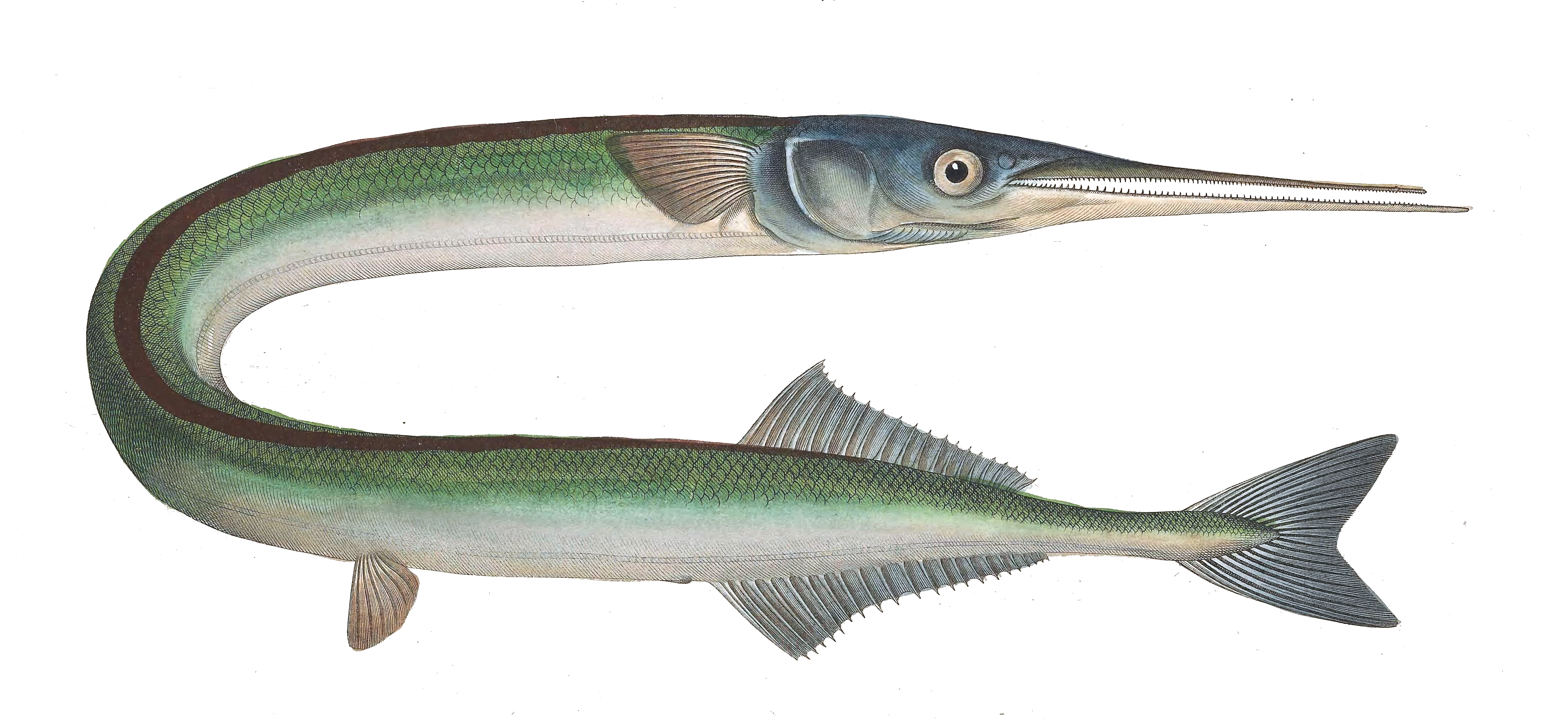
Garfish (Belone belone), a pelagic fish found in coastal and brackish waters.

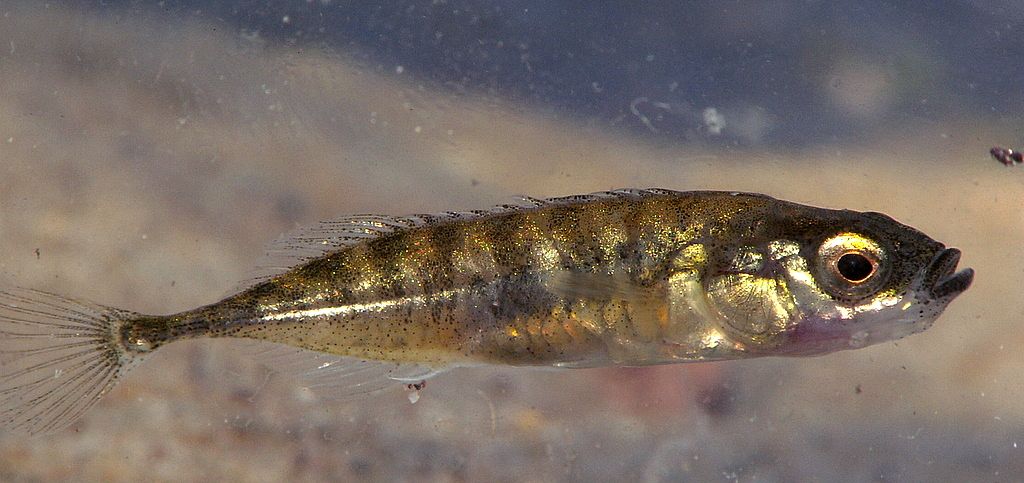
Ninespine stickleback (Pungitius pungitius), a euryhaline fish inhabiting freshwater, brackish, and marine environments.

==== Total quantity ====
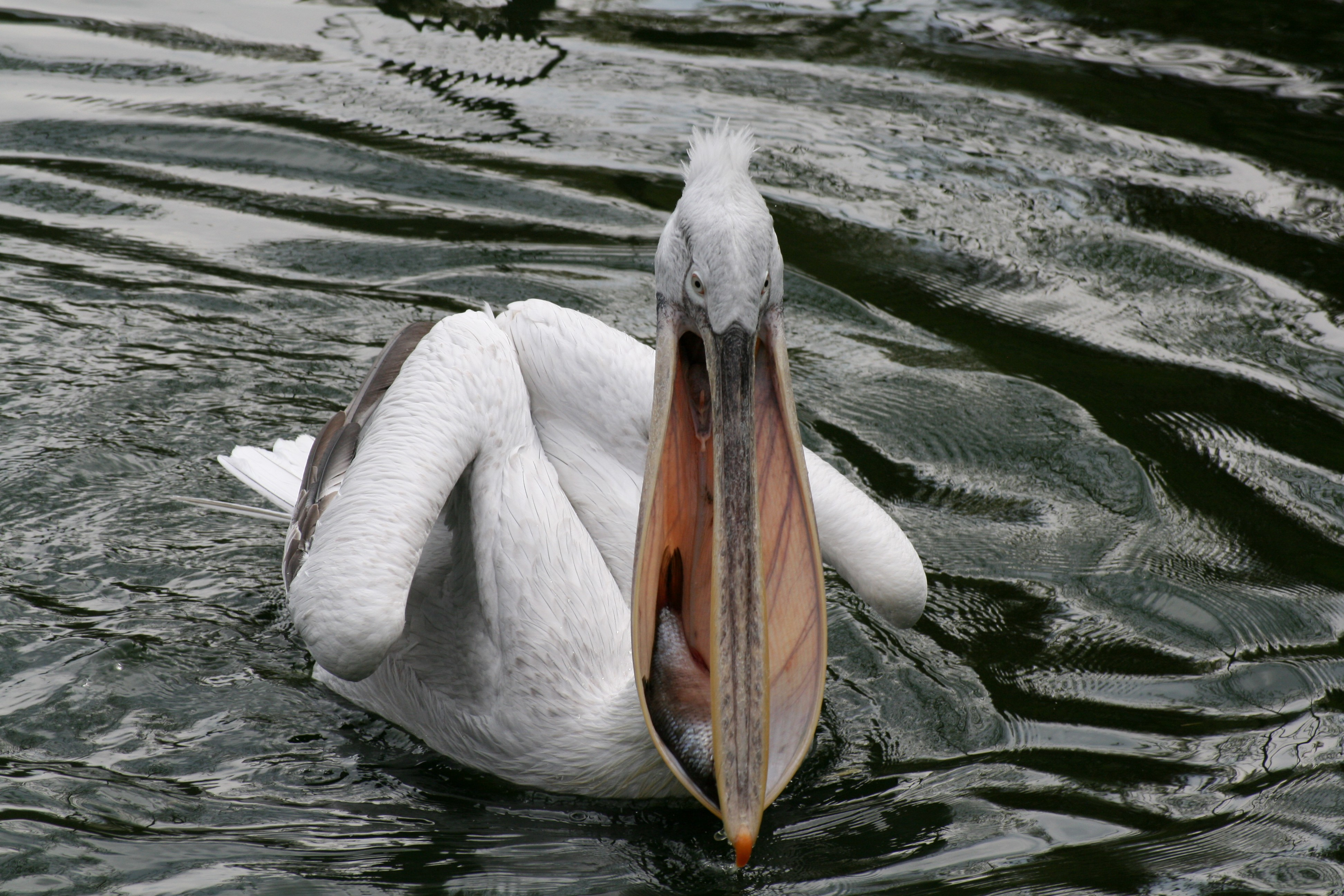
Dalmatian pelican using his pouch to hold fish weighing more than 1 kg (2.2 lb).

Earlier estimates based on field observations suggested that adult Dalmatian pelicans could consume between 2.5 and 3 kilograms of fish per day, although later field data and stomach analyses have indicated more typical daily consumption ranges of 1.2–1.5 kilograms.

The size of fish consumed varies widely depending on location and availability, with recorded prey ranging from as little as 3 grams up to 2,500 grams, although more typically between 30 and 1,200 grams. When feeding on smaller fish, Dalmatian pelicans have been observed increasing their consumption rate to meet energetic needs.

At Lake Mikri Prespa, regurgitates from adult pelicans feeding chicks contained an average of 384 g of fish, with up to 29 individual fish per sample. The size of these prey items ranged from 52 to 153 mm, although some regurgitates included individuals as small as 44 mm and weighing just 0.57 g.

=== Spatial and temporal foraging patterns ===
The diet of the Dalmatian Pelican is shaped by its foraging patterns, which are constrained by both the time of day when they fish and the proximity to their nesting sites. They typically forage in the early morning, at dawn, and during the late hours of the day, at dusk. When breeding, they rarely forage beyond 1 km from the nest—an interesting contrast to Great White Pelicans, which may travel tens of kilometres to find food.

Their diet also shows marked seasonal variation. In early spring, they feed on fish that have died from hypoxia induced by ice cover. By late spring and early summer (May–June), their diet is dominated by adult fish. In mid-summer (July), they shift to juvenile fish. When chicks hatch, parents feed them a paste of semi-digested fish regurgitated directly into their bills. By late summer (August), fledglings begin catching appropriately sized fish themselves. For example, by around 1.5 months of age, they are already catching sticklebacks.

In autumn, large congregations of Dalmatian Pelicans gather at sites such as the Terek Delta to exploit seasonal movements of freshwater fish fry. Remarkably, from November to April, their diet remains largely unknown, leaving a significant gap in our understanding of their feeding ecology for nearly half the year.

==== Feeding range ====
The Dalmatian Pelican is a generalist predator (Note: Nevertheless, some populations seem to exhibit dietary preferences. At Lake Mikri Prespa, for instance, during the breeding season, Dalmatian Pelicans feed exclusively on Alburnus belvica, despite the presence of over 20 fish species, including common carp. This selectivity may be explained by the extended spawning period of A. belvica (April–August), which provides a reliable food source throughout the breeding season, including for late or replacement broods.), but its diet varies with the prey available in each waterbody. It forages across diverse habitats and depths, from scavenging dead fish in drying wetlands to hunting live prey in waters up to 8 metres deep. Most of the fish it consumes inhabit shallow areas such as lake shores, estuaries, channels, and reservoirs.

=== Foraging behaviour ===
Dalmatian Pelicans generally forage alone, in pairs, or occasionally in trios, swimming upright and periodically plunging their heads to seize prey just beneath the surface. These imposing waterbirds cannot dive deep; instead, they depend on shallow waters, where fish linger near the surface and fishermen seldom intrude. When prey remains out of reach in deeper waters, pelicans may form loose cooperative groups, arranging themselves into semicircles that drive fish toward the shallows. Once in clear waters rich in submerged vegetation, pelicans may remain almost motionless, waiting for fish to venture within striking distance.

A short video of Dalmatian Pelicans being fed by boaters in Lake Kerkini.

During autumn, as water levels recede and wetlands dry, Dalmatian Pelicans turn to scavenging, feeding on fish weakened or killed by hypoxia and desiccation. This behaviour helps limit the spread of disease and restores a precarious balance to the ecosystem. In these shrinking landscapes, the pelican endures, plunging, preying, and holding disease at bay.

== Trophic interactions ==
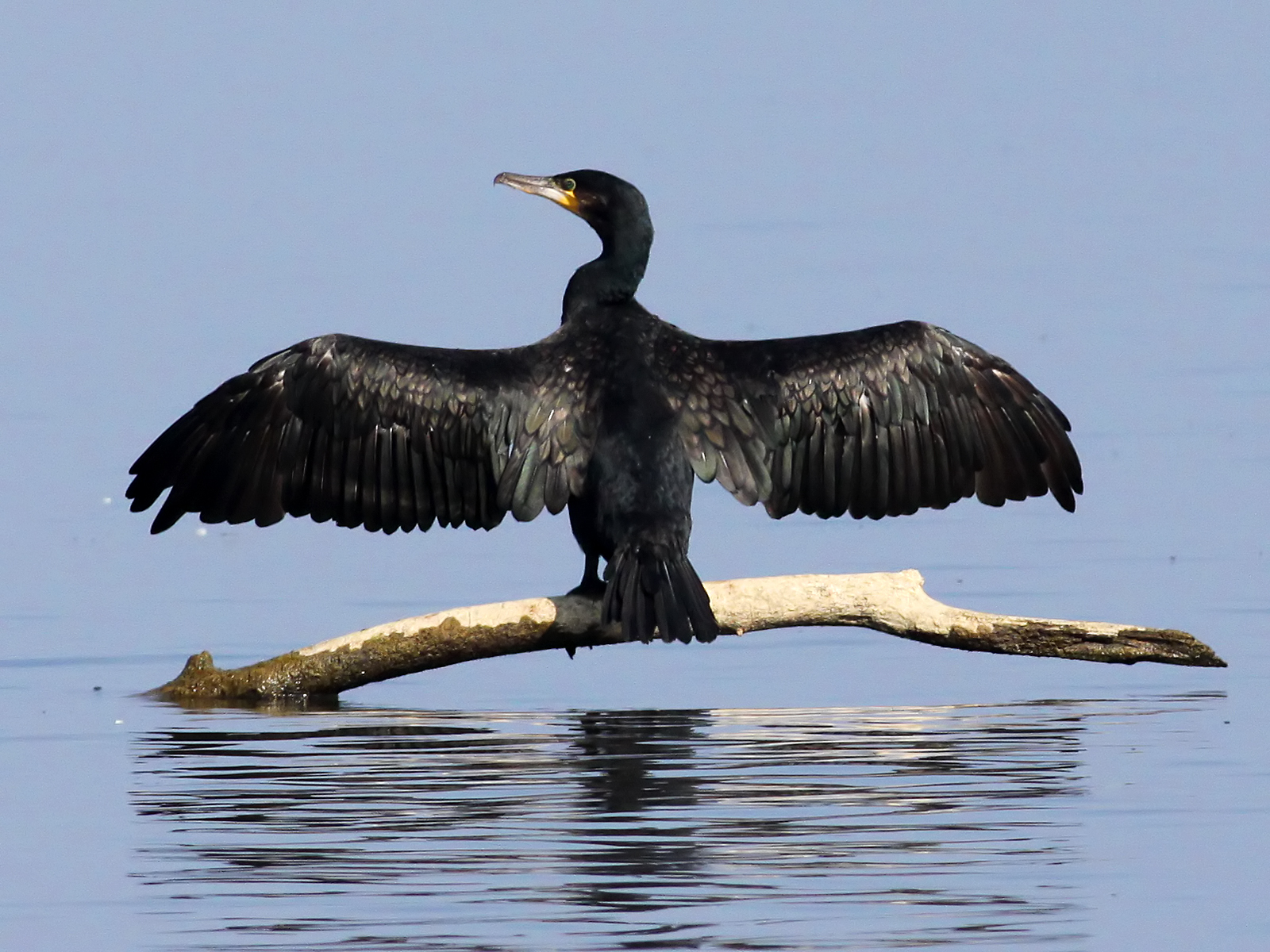
Great cormorants (Phalacrocorax carbo) feed among Dalmatian pelicans, sometimes as competitors, other times as collaborators.

Dalmatian pelicans play an important role in the wetland food web. They are primarily predators, but they also act as commensals, kleptoparasites, hosts, and occasionally as prey. They often forage alongside cormorants, gulls, grebes, and mergansers, yet these mixed-species groups are more dynamic than they appear.

In the deeper waters of the Prespa lakes and the northern Caspian deltas, where diving spots are scarce, great cormorants (Phalacrocorax carbo) gather in large numbers. As they dive and disturb fish shoals, Dalmatian pelicans take advantage, swimming forward to catch the fish that rise near the surface. If this fails, pelicans may turn to opportunistic kleptoparasitism, striking at cormorants as they surface to steal their catch.

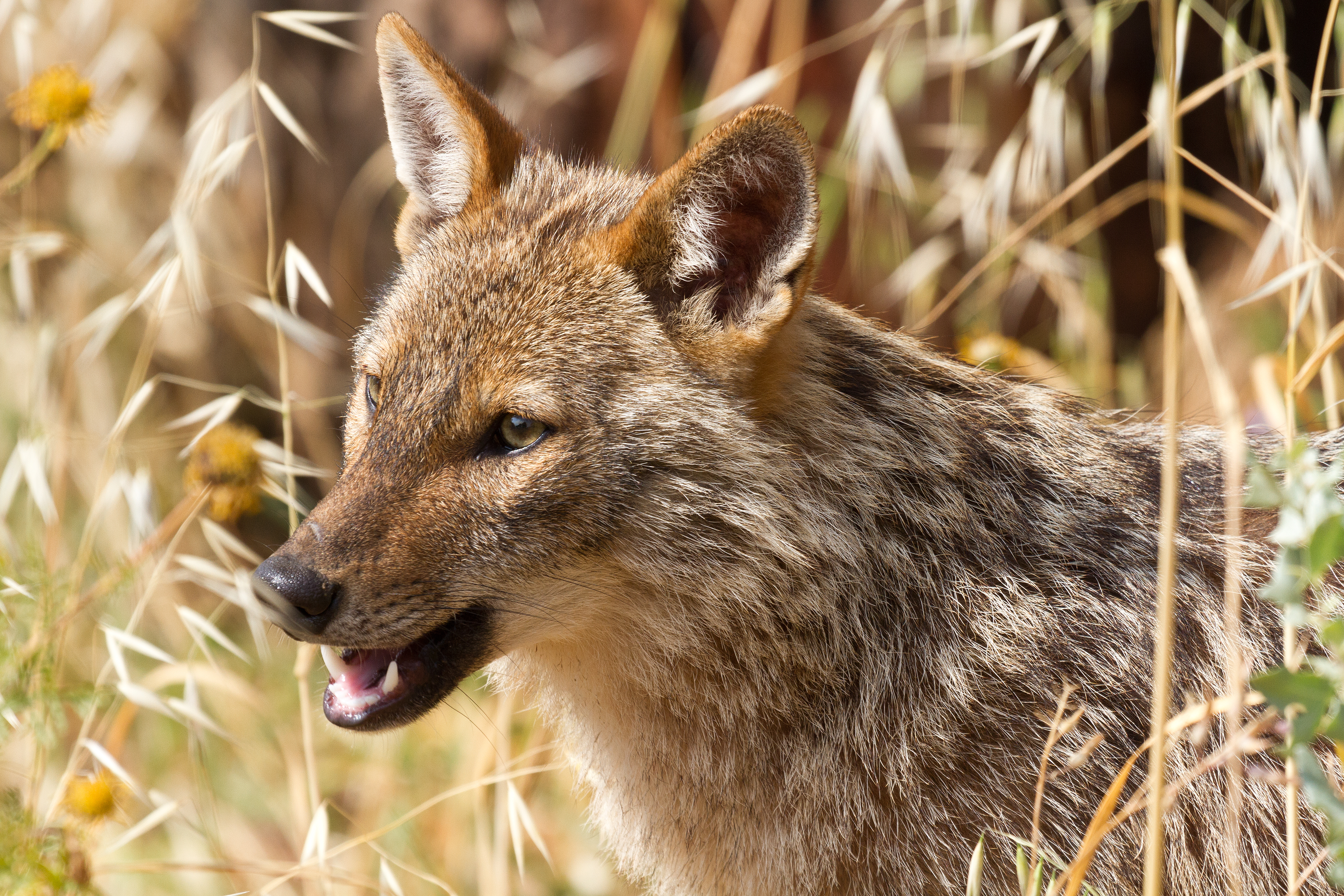
Golden jackal (Canis aureus) in Iran.

Adult Dalmatian pelicans have no known natural predators (Note: Although no formal studies have directly tested predation risk on adult Dalmatian pelicans, the absence of reported predation in comprehensive conservation assessments suggests that such events are either extremely rare or non-existent.), and predation is not considered a significant cause of adult mortality. Nonetheless, adult survival may be affected by parasitic nematodes (Contracaecum spp.) acquired from the fish they consume. Eggs, however, are vulnerable. When water levels fall, Eurasian lynx, and canids such as golden jackals, foxes, grey wolves, and dogs can reach the nests and feed on the eggs. Wild boar have also been seen trampling nests while moving through colonies. In addition, large gulls and eagles have been observed preying on eggs in Russia, Albania, and Turkey.

== Breeding ==
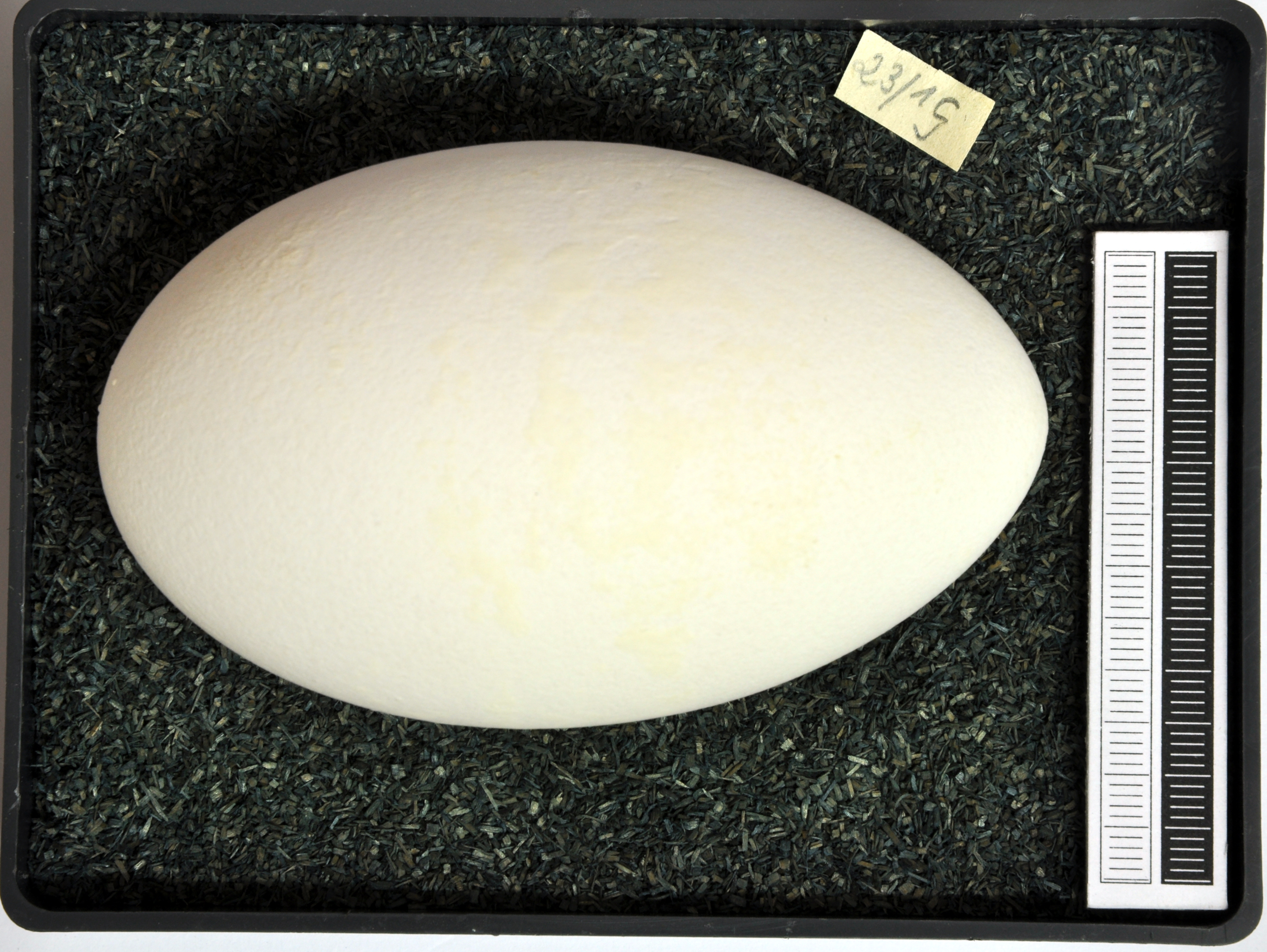
Egg, Collection Museum Wiesbaden

Among a highly social family in general, the Dalmatian pelican may have the least social inclinations. This species naturally nests in relatively small groups compared to most other pelican species and sometimes may even nest alone. However, small colonies are usually formed, which regularly include upwards of 250 pairs (especially historically). Occasionally, Dalmatian pelicans may mix in with colonies of great white pelicans. Nesting sites selected are usually either islands in large bodies of water (typically lagoons or river deltas) or dense mats of aquatic vegetation, such as extensive reedbeds of Phragmites and Typha. Due to its large size, this pelican often tramples the vegetation in the area surrounding its nest into the muddy substrate and thus nesting sites may become unsuitably muddy after around three years of usage.

The nest is a moderately-sized pile of grass, reeds, sticks, and feathers, usually measuring about 1 m (3.3 ft) deep and 63 cm (25 in) across. Nests are usually located on or near the ground, often being placed on dense floating vegetation. Nests tend to be flimsy until cemented together by droppings. Breeding commences in March or April, about a month before the great white pelican breeds. The Dalmatian pelican lays a clutch of one to six eggs, with two eggs being the norm. Eggs weigh between 120 and 195 g (4.2 and 6.9 oz). Incubation, which is split between both parents, lasts for 30 to 34 days. The chicks are born naked but soon sprout white down feathers. Aggressive behaviour between siblings is very rare and generally non-fatal. When the young are 6 to 7 weeks of age, the pelicans frequently gather in "pods". The offspring fledge at around 85 days and become independent at 100 to 105 days old. Nesting success relies on local environmental conditions, with anywhere from 58% to 100% of hatchlings successfully surviving to adulthood. Sexual maturity is thought to be obtained at three or four years of age.

== Threats ==
Throughout the 20th century, the Dalmatian pelican underwent a dramatic decline in numbers, becoming one of the most threatened pelican species. Habitat loss due to wetland drainage and land conversion is considered one of the primary drivers of this decline.

=== Conflict with fisheries ===
In some regions, conflict with fisheries has led to localized persecution of Dalmatian pelicans, which are occasionally shot by fishermen who perceive them as competitors for declining fish stocks. While such killings tend to occur on a small scale, the perception that pelicans significantly deplete fish populations remains widespread in many fishing communities. However, statistical comparisons have shown that the composition of pelican diet differs notably from fishery yields, suggesting only limited direct competition. At Karavasta Lagoon in Albania, Dalmatian pelicans were estimated to consume between 13.7% and 16.5% of the mean fishery catch in 1992, and between 19.4% and 23.3% in 1993, although the methods and assumptions used in these calculations have been questioned.

=== Poaching ===
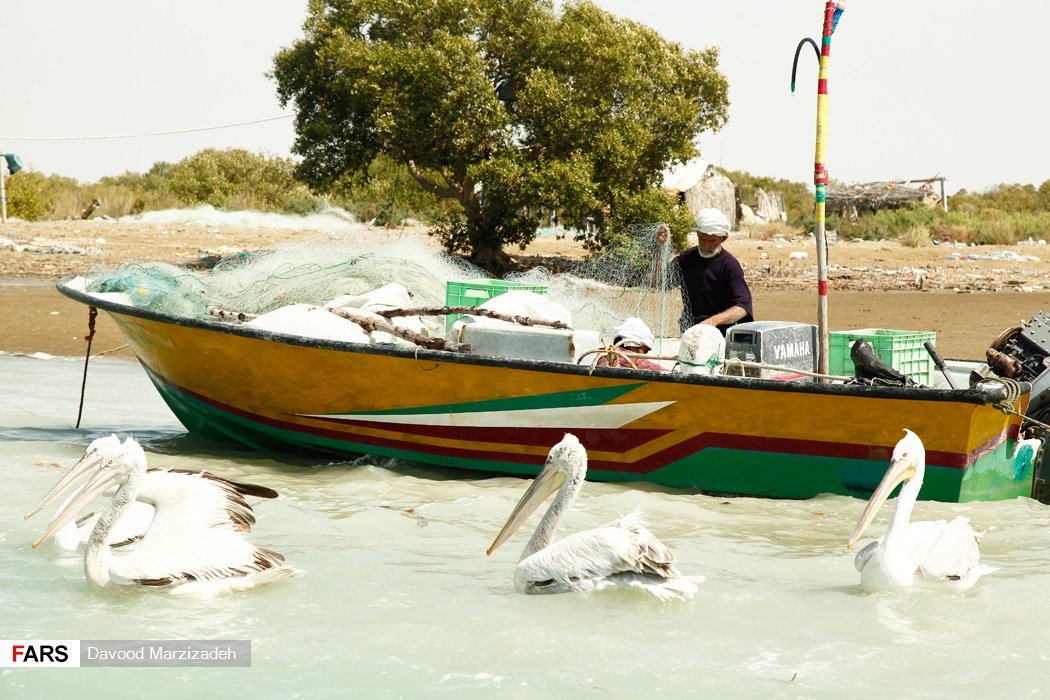
Dalmatian pelicans with fisherman at Qeshm, Iran.

Poaching represents an additional serious threat in parts of Asia, particularly in Mongolia. There, local hunters illegally kill pelicans to sell their bills, which are fashioned into pouches. These pelican bill pouches are highly valued; on a typical day in a Mongolian market, as many as 50 may be offered for sale, and their worth can be equivalent to a trade of ten horses and thirty sheep. This level of exploitation has reduced the Mongolian population to fewer than 130 individuals, making the species critically endangered in that region.

=== Power line collisions ===
Electrocution is a frequent cause of death in areas where power lines cross known flight paths. Efforts to reduce mortality from power lines have included marking dangerous lines with visual warnings and even dismantling some infrastructure near breeding colonies.

=== Tourism ===
Human disturbance at breeding sites has also been a major factor. Like all pelicans, Dalmatian pelicans are extremely sensitive to disturbance; if approached or startled, adults may temporarily abandon their nests, exposing eggs and chicks to predation or fatal exposure to the elements. In Greece, high levels of disturbance from recreational boating—particularly powerboats carrying tourists—have been linked to feeding disruptions, sometimes causing starvation and mortality in pelican populations.

== Conservation ==
Water level management, habitat restoration, and public education programs have played vital roles in improving local conditions for breeding success. However, conservation progress has been slower in parts of Asia, where poaching, shooting, and habitat destruction remain more pervasive and difficult to control.

=== Monitoring and population censuses ===
Dalmatian pelicans have been systematically monitored since 1967 through mid-winter counts conducted as part of the International Waterbird Census (IWC), coordinated by Wetlands International. Today, the species is surveyed across five major population units: the Western and Eastern subpopulations of the Black Sea–Mediterranean flyway, the Fore-Caucasus and West Caspian populations, the Central and West Asia flyway populations, and the Mongolia–China population. These efforts are coordinated by BirdLife International and the UNEP/AEWA Secretariat, in collaboration with national and local partners.

Population censuses integrate aerial and ground surveys, bird ringing programs, and increasingly, satellite telemetry using GPS tags. These tools are vital instruments for tracking population trends, guiding conservation priorities, evaluating the success of habitat restoration, and informing national and international conservation status assessments. They support the design and revision of action plans, the identification of key breeding and wintering sites, and the monitoring of reintroduction efforts and mitigation measures. identification

==== Summary of institutions or organisations involved in the Dalmatian pelican census ====
Western subpopulation of the Black Sea–Mediterranean flyway
- Albania: Albanian Ornithological Society; PPNEA; National Agency of Protected Areas
- France: Tour du Valat
- Greece: Hellenic Ornithological Society; Society for the Protection of Prespa; National Park Management Bodies (Amvrakikos, Kerkini)
- Montenegro: CZIP; Ministry of Sustainable Development and Tourism; Natural History Museum of Montenegro
- North Macedonia: Macedonian Ecological Society
Eastern subpopulation of the Black Sea–Mediterranean flyway
- Bulgaria: Bulgarian Society for the Protection of Birds
- Romania: Romanian Ornithological Society; Danube Delta National Institute; Romanian Ministry of Environment
- Turkey: Doğa Derneği; Ege University; Ministry of Forestry
- Russian Federation: Russian Academy of Sciences; Omsk State University; Kuban State University
- Ukraine: Ukrainian Society for the Protection of Birds
Fore-Caucasus and West Caspian populations
- Armenia: Armenian Society for the Protection of Birds
- Azerbaijan: Azerbaijan Ornithological Society
- Georgia: SABUKO
Central and West Asia flyway populations
- India: Bombay Natural History Society
- Iran: Department of Environment
- Iraq: Nature Iraq
- Kazakhstan: Institute of Zoology
- Pakistan: WWF-Pakistan; Ministry of Climate Change and Environmental Coordination
- Turkmenistan: Turkmen Association of Hunters
- Uzbekistan: Uzbekistan Society for the Protection of Birds; Institute of Zoology
Mongolia and China population
- China: Wetlands International; Chinese Academy of Sciences
- Mongolia: Wildlife Science and Conservation Centre

==== Challenges and innovations ====
Despite decades of effort, comprehensive coverage remains difficult in some regions due to limited access, sparse ornithological infrastructure, or logistical constraints. Pelicans are mobile and wide-ranging, and counts may underestimate their numbers due to weather conditions, observer error, or birds moving between roosting and feeding areas.

Yet such challenges have spurred innovation. During extreme climatic events, such as the Caspian freeze of 2012, unexpected congregation sites were reported by local observers, revealing previously unknown wintering habitats. These moments prompted methodological shifts: enhanced winter monitoring, closer collaboration with local fishing communities, and the adoption of real-time reporting tools.

Citizen science has also played a transformative role. In countries like China and Iran, some of the most significant observations (a sudden count exceeding 100 individuals) were reported not by government agencies, but by volunteers and grassroots networks such as the China Coastal Waterbird Census. In places like Mongolia and China, population estimates often rely on short-term, grant-funded initiatives, making the continuity of monitoring efforts uncertain—and dependent more on the presence of observers than on sustained institutional capacity.

==== Transboundary cooperation ====
Pelican monitoring has also catalysed international cooperation. Because Dalmatian pelicans rely on transboundary wetlands, such as Lake Prespa, effective census work demands cross-border coordination, even between states with political tensions. For example, although many birds nest in Greece, they frequently forage in North Macedonia. Yet, for years, the latter was not recognized as a "range state" in conservation terms, despite its ecological importance.

=== Floating rafts ===
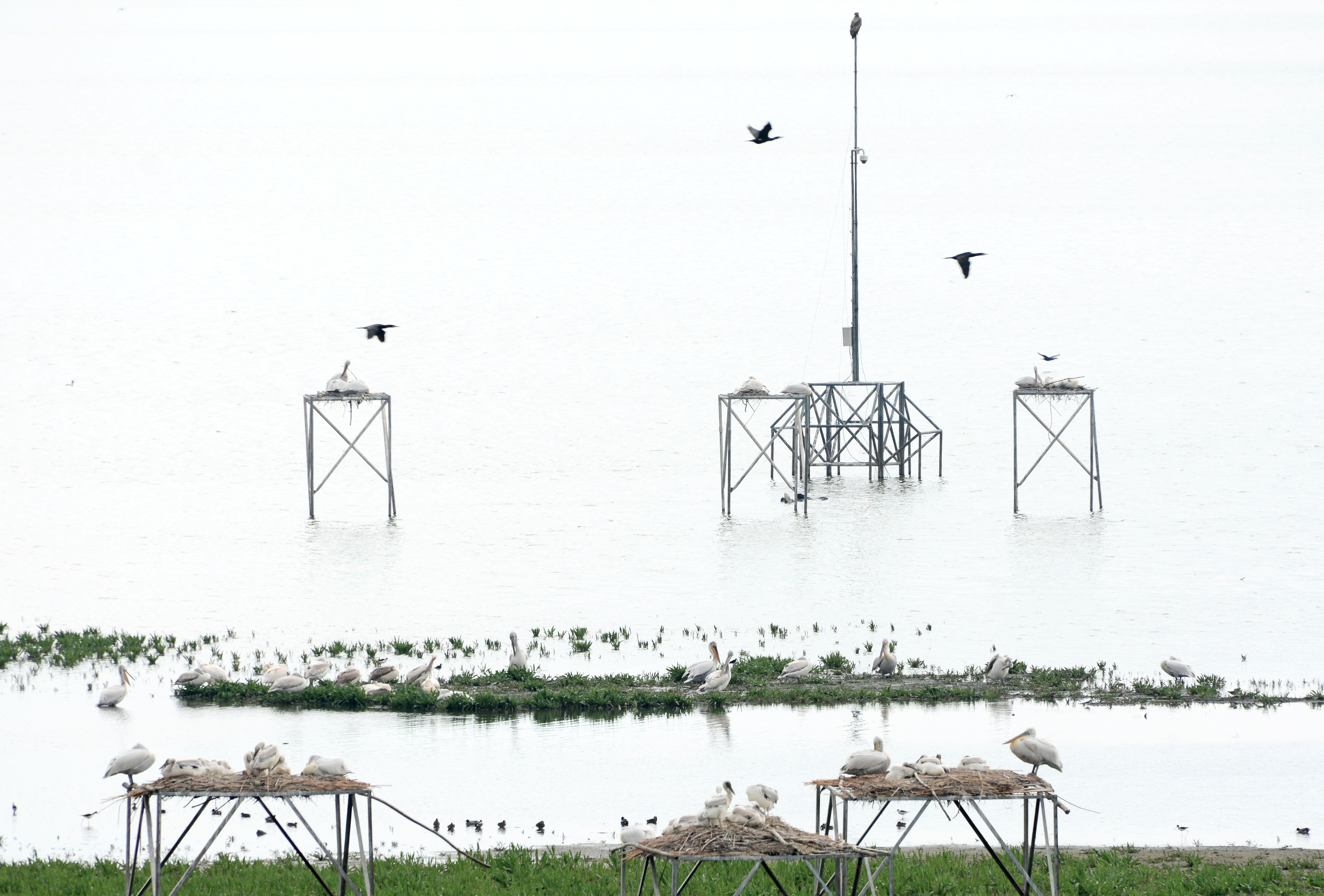
Kuşcenneti National Park, Turkey, showing rafts and platforms that allow pelicans to nest.

The Dalmatian pelican is protected under the Agreement on the Conservation of African-Eurasian Migratory Waterbirds (AEWA), and several countries have launched national initiatives to protect and restore populations. Artificial nesting platforms have been installed in Turkey, Greece, Bulgaria, and Romania, encouraging breeding where natural nest sites have been lost or degraded. Additionally, floating rafts have been placed in wetlands in Greece and Bulgaria, providing secure nesting spots isolated from predators and human disturbance.

=== Community conservation ===
A notable example of community-driven conservation occurred in 2012, when extreme cold froze large sections of the Caspian Sea, threatening the survival of overwintering Dalmatian pelicans. Despite initial discouragement from local authorities, many residents took action, bringing fish and hand-feeding the birds to help them survive the harsh conditions.
