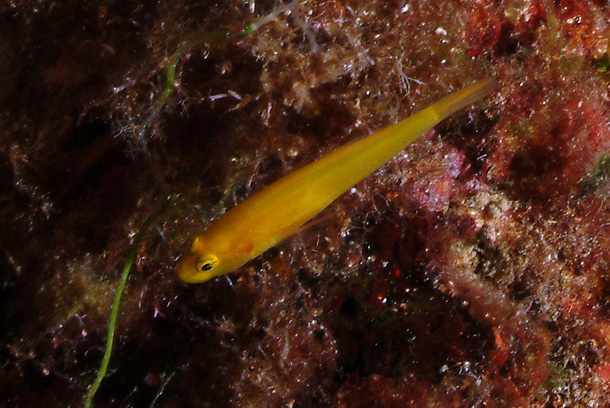

Conservation status
- Least Concern (IUCN 3.1)

Scientific classification
- Kingdom: Animalia
- Phylum: Chordata
- Class: Actinopterygii
- Division: Teleostei
- Order: Gobiiformes
- Family: Gobiidae
- Genus: Gobius
- Species: G. auratus

Binomial name
- Gobius auratus A. Risso, 1810

Synonyms
- Eleotris auratus (A. Risso, 1810); Gobius paganellus auratus A. Risso, 1810; Gobius auratus luteus Kolombatovic, 1891; Gobius luteus Kolombatovic, 1891

= Golden goby =

Species of fish

The golden goby (Gobius auratus) is a species of goby from the family Gobiidae endemic to the Mediterranean Sea. It prefers areas with rocky substrates at depths of from 5 to 80 metres (16 to 262 ft) (though usually not below 30 metres (98 ft)) with plentiful growth of algae and gorgonians. This species can reach a length of 10 centimetres (3.9 in) TL. It can also be found in the aquarium trade. Gobius xanthocephalus is the name that is applied to the populations of similar gobies in the eastern Atlantic and western Mediterranean which were previously considered to be G. auratus.
