= Schmidt's goby =

Conservation status
- Data Deficient (IUCN 3.1)

Scientific classification
- Domain: Eukaryota
- Kingdom: Animalia
- Phylum: Chordata
- Class: Actinopterygii
- Order: Gobiiformes
- Family: Gobiidae
- Genus: Gobius
- Species: G. strictus

Binomial name
- Gobius strictus Fage, 1907

Synonyms
- Cabotia schmidti de Buen, 1930; Gobius assoi de Buen, 1936

Species of fish

Gobius strictus, Schmidt's goby, is a doubtfully valid species of goby native to the Mediterranean Sea where it is known from around Mallorca and Morocco and from the Adriatic coasts of Croatia. This species can be found at depths of from 25 to 40 metres (82 to 131 ft). It can reach a length of 6.5 centimetres (2.6 in) SL. It is suspected that this species actually represents a juvenile of G. cruentatus.
