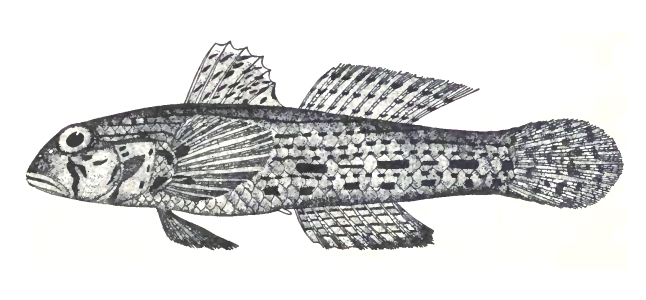
- Illustration in Albert W. C. T. Herre (1910). "Gobies of the Philippines and the China Sea". in The Philippine Bureau of Science Monographic Publications on Fishes. Smithsonian Institution

Conservation status
- Least Concern (IUCN 3.1)

Scientific classification
- Kingdom: Animalia
- Phylum: Chordata
- Class: Actinopterygii
- Order: Gobiiformes
- Family: Gobiidae
- Genus: Istigobius
- Species: I. ornatus

Binomial name
- Istigobius ornatus (Rüppell, 1830)

Synonyms
- Gobius elegans Valenciennes, 1837

= Istigobius ornatus =

Species of fish

Istigobius ornatus, the Ornate goby, is a species of gobies found in the Indo-Pacific.

== See also ==
- List of fishes of India
- List of reef fish of the Red Sea
