= Salamansa goby =

Scientific classification
- Domain: Eukaryota
- Kingdom: Animalia
- Phylum: Chordata
- Class: Actinopterygii
- Order: Gobiiformes
- Family: Gobiidae
- Genus: Gobius
- Species: G. salamansa

Binomial name
- Gobius salamansa Iglésias & Frotte, 2015

Species of fish

The Salamansa goby (Gobius salamansa) is a species of marine fish from the family Gobiidae, the true gobies. It is only known from the Bay of Salamansa in the north of the island of São Vicente, Cape Verde, where it occurs to a depth of about 1 metre (3.3 ft). The species was named and described by Samuel P. Iglésias and Lou Frotté in 2015. The species name salamansa refers to the type location.
