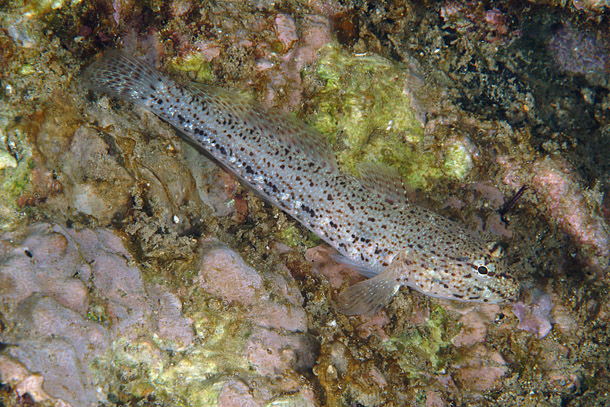

Conservation status
- Least Concern (IUCN 3.1)

Scientific classification
- Kingdom: Animalia
- Phylum: Chordata
- Class: Actinopterygii
- Order: Gobiiformes
- Family: Gobiidae
- Genus: Gobius
- Species: G. incognitus

Binomial name
- Gobius incognitus Kovačić & Šanda, 2016

= Gobius incognitus =

Species of fish

Gobius incognitus, the incognito goby or anemone goby, is a species of goby native to the Mediterranean Sea and perhaps the Black Sea. The name incognitus means "unknown" in Latin and refers to the long period of time that passed before this common and widespread species was recognized and described. Prior to its description, it was confused with Bucchich's goby (G. bucchichi), a species that now appears to be restricted to the Eastern Mediterranean Sea and perhaps the Black Sea. Much previously published information for Bucchich's goby is now considered to actually be for the incognito goby.

The incognito goby typically reaches a length of 8–10 cm (3.1–3.9 in), and feeds on small invertebrates and algae. The incognito goby is found at the bottom from shallow water to a depth of 12 m (39 ft). It is often associated with the sea anemone Anemonia sulcata, hiding amongst its tentacles when threatened. Juveniles are typically found with sea urchins.
