= Bellotti's goby =

Conservation status
- Least Concern (IUCN 3.1)

Scientific classification
- Domain: Eukaryota
- Kingdom: Animalia
- Phylum: Chordata
- Class: Actinopterygii
- Order: Gobiiformes
- Family: Gobiidae
- Genus: Gobius
- Species: G. ater

Binomial name
- Gobius ater Bellotti, 1888

Synonyms
- Gobius balearicus Lozano y Rey, 1919

Species of fish

Gobius ater, Bellotti's goby, is a species of goby native to the Mediterranean Sea from the Balearic Islands and the Gulf of Lion to Nice and Sardinia. It occurs in shallow waters and lagoons where it prefers beds of the seagrass Posidonia oceanica. This species can reach a length of 7.1 centimetres (2.8 in) SL.
