= Gobius leucomelas =

Scientific classification
- Domain: Eukaryota
- Kingdom: Animalia
- Phylum: Chordata
- Class: Actinopterygii
- Order: Gobiiformes
- Family: Gobiidae
- Genus: Gobius
- Species: G. leucomelas

Binomial name
- Gobius leucomelas W. K. H. Peters, 1868

Species of fish

Gobius leucomelas is a species of goby native to the western Indian Ocean where it is only known from off of the coasts of Eritrea.
