= Gobius ateriformis =

Conservation status
- Least Concern (IUCN 3.1)

Scientific classification
- Domain: Eukaryota
- Kingdom: Animalia
- Phylum: Chordata
- Class: Actinopterygii
- Order: Gobiiformes
- Family: Gobiidae
- Genus: Gobius
- Species: G. ateriformis

Binomial name
- Gobius ateriformis Brito & P. J. Miller, 2001

Species of fish

Gobius ateriformis is a species of marine fish from the family Gobiidae, the true gobies. It is endemic to Cape Verde, where it occurs in tide pools to a depth of 11 metres (36 ft). The species was first described by Alberto Brito and Peter J. Miller in 2001.

== Description ==
This species can reach a length of 6.8 centimetres (2.7 in) TL.
