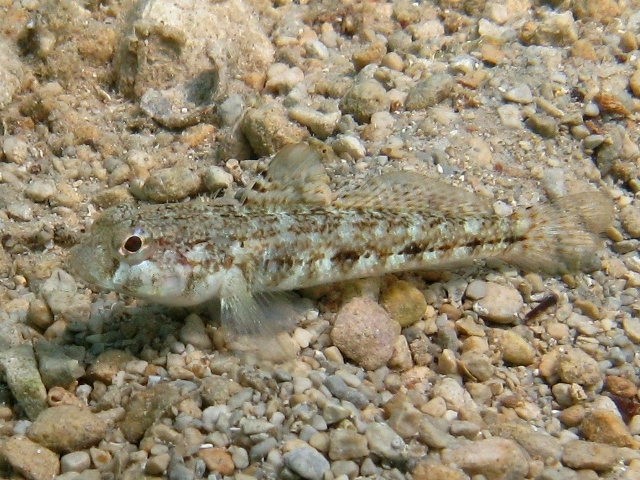

Conservation status
- Least Concern (IUCN 3.1)

Scientific classification
- Kingdom: Animalia
- Phylum: Chordata
- Class: Actinopterygii
- Order: Gobiiformes
- Family: Gobiidae
- Genus: Gobius
- Species: G. roulei

Binomial name
- Gobius roulei F. de Buen, 1928

= Roule's goby =

Species of fish

Gobius roulei, Roule's goby, is a species of goby native to the eastern Atlantic Ocean and the Mediterranean Sea where it can be found at depths of from 320 to 385 metres (1,050 to 1,263 ft). This species can reach a length of 8 centimetres (3.1 in) TL. The specific name honours the French zoologist Louis Roule (1861-1942) who was the collector of the type.
