= Gobius koseirensis =

Scientific classification
- Domain: Eukaryota
- Kingdom: Animalia
- Phylum: Chordata
- Class: Actinopterygii
- Order: Gobiiformes
- Family: Gobiidae
- Genus: Gobius
- Species: G. koseirensis

Binomial name
- Gobius koseirensis Klunzinger, 1871

Species of fish

Gobius koseirensis is a species of goby native to the western Indian Ocean where it is only known to occur off the coast of Egypt.
