= Gobius tetrophthalmus =

Conservation status
- Vulnerable (IUCN 3.1)

Scientific classification
- Kingdom: Animalia
- Phylum: Chordata
- Class: Actinopterygii
- Order: Gobiiformes
- Family: Gobiidae
- Genus: Gobius
- Species: G. tetrophthalmus

Binomial name
- Gobius tetrophthalmus Brito & P. J. Miller, 2001

Species of fish

Gobius tetrophthalmus is a species of marine fish from the family Gobiidae, the true gobies. It occurs in the Atlantic Ocean around Cape Verde, western Africa, where it is found at depths from 7 to 25 metres (23 to 82 ft). It prefers areas with coralline algae though it will also inhabit areas with substrates of sand and rock. This species can reach a length of 7.8 centimetres (3.1 in) TL. It is harmless to humans.
