= Gobius tropicus =

Scientific classification
- Domain: Eukaryota
- Kingdom: Animalia
- Phylum: Chordata
- Class: Actinopterygii
- Order: Gobiiformes
- Family: Gobiidae
- Genus: Gobius
- Species: G. tropicus

Binomial name
- Gobius tropicus Osbeck, 1765

Species of fish

Gobius tropicus is a species of fish currently classified in the family Gobiidae. It is native the Atlantic waters around Ascension Island. The actual taxonomic position of this species is uncertain and it is suspected that it is not even a goby.
