= Gobius scorteccii =

Scientific classification
- Kingdom: Animalia
- Phylum: Chordata
- Class: Actinopterygii
- Order: Gobiiformes
- Family: Gobiidae
- Genus: Gobius
- Species: G. scorteccii

Binomial name
- Gobius scorteccii Poll, 1961

Species of fish

Gobius scorteccii is a species of freshwater goby native to Somalia, Africa. This species can reach a length of 13.6 centimetres (5.4 in) TL. The specific name honours the Italian herpetologist Giuseppe Scortecci (1898–1973) of the University of Genoa, who was the collector of the type.
