= Alburnus belvica =

Conservation status
- Endangered (IUCN 3.1)

Scientific classification
- Kingdom: Animalia
- Phylum: Chordata
- Class: Actinopterygii
- Order: Cypriniformes
- Family: Leuciscidae
- Subfamily: Leuciscinae
- Genus: Alburnus
- Species: A. belvica

Binomial name
- Alburnus belvica (S. L. Karaman, 1924)

Synonyms
- Alburnus alburnus belvica Karaman, 1924; Chalcalburnus belvica (Karaman, 1924)

Species of fish

Alburnus belvica. the Prespa bleak, is a species of ray-finned fish in the family Leuciscidae, that can be found in Lake Prespa and the nearby Small Prespa Lake in the Balkans. In North Macedonia it is known as nivichka (нивичка). It is threatened by habitat loss. This species makes up the bulk of the diet of the Dalmatian pelican (Pelecanus crispus) population breeding at the Small Prespa Lake.

Alburnus belvica is a short-lived species which is found in freshwater lakes and slow-flowing water courses on low-lying plains. The adults' diet consists of invertebrates and plantas well as plankton. They form large schools when foraging. and they spawn in the tributaries and along shores of lakes on pebbles and gravel in surf zone. If they are spawning in tributaries they move up to the spawning sites during the night. Spawning occurs in May and June and the adults are pelagic except when spawning.

Alburnus belvica is distinctive from its congeners in its possession of a higher number of gill rakers, 29-32 compared to a maximum of 26 in most Alburnus species and also By the larger number of scales in the lateral line, 52-57 compared to 54. In Lake Prespa this species can attain a total length of 180 millimetres (7.1 in).

The populations of A. belvica are increasing in both Lake Prespa and Small Lake Prespa despite the threats of water pollution, overfishing, and water extraction. It is also potentially threatened by competition from invasive species of fishes such as Lepomis gibbosus and Pseudorasbora parva. This increase may be due to eutrophication of the lakes' water causing an increase on the amount of plankton, on which these fish feed, combined with the short generation time of this species.
