= Gobius hypselosoma =

Conservation status
- Least Concern (IUCN 3.1)

Scientific classification
- Kingdom: Animalia
- Phylum: Chordata
- Class: Actinopterygii
- Order: Gobiiformes
- Family: Gobiidae
- Genus: Gobius
- Species: G. hypselosoma

Binomial name
- Gobius hypselosoma Bleeker, 1867

Synonyms
- Chonophorus hypselosoma (Bleeker, 1867); Gobius nigripinnis Valenciennes, 1837; Gobius isognathus Bleeker, 1867; Gobius melanopterus Bleeker, 1867

Species of fish

Gobius hypselosoma is a species of goby native to fresh and brackish waters of Madagascar and the Mascarene Islands. It can reach a length of 25 centimetres (9.8 in) TL.
