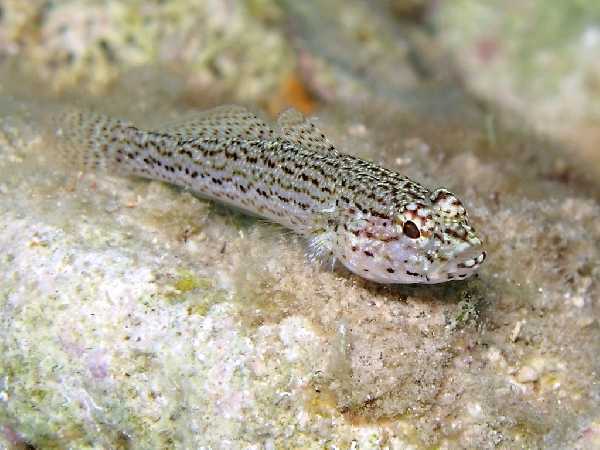

Conservation status
- Least Concern (IUCN 3.1)

Scientific classification
- Domain: Eukaryota
- Kingdom: Animalia
- Phylum: Chordata
- Class: Actinopterygii
- Order: Gobiiformes
- Family: Gobiidae
- Genus: Gobius
- Species: G. fallax

Binomial name
- Gobius fallax Sarato, 1889

Synonyms
- Gobius auratus ruginosa Kolombatovic, 1891

= Sarato's goby =

Species of fish

Gobius fallax, or Sarato's goby, is a species of goby native to the Mediterranean Sea where it is found in inshore waters in locations with rocks and crevices for shelter at depths of from 0 to 32 metres (0 to 105 ft). This species can reach a length of 9 centimetres (3.5 in) TL. There is a single record from the Canary Islands.
