= Gobius senegambiensis =

Conservation status
- Least Concern (IUCN 3.1)

Scientific classification
- Kingdom: Animalia
- Phylum: Chordata
- Class: Actinopterygii
- Order: Gobiiformes
- Family: Gobiidae
- Genus: Gobius
- Species: G. senegambiensis

Binomial name
- Gobius senegambiensis Metzelaar, 1919

Species of fish

Gobius senegambiensis is a species of marine fish from the family Gobiidae, the true gobies. It is native to the Atlantic Ocean from Morocco to Angola as well as the islands in the Gulf of Guinea. It is found in inshore waters on sandy bottoms. This species can reach a length of 7.3 centimetres (2.9 in) SL.

The species name senegambiensis refers to Senegambia, a historic region of West Africa.
