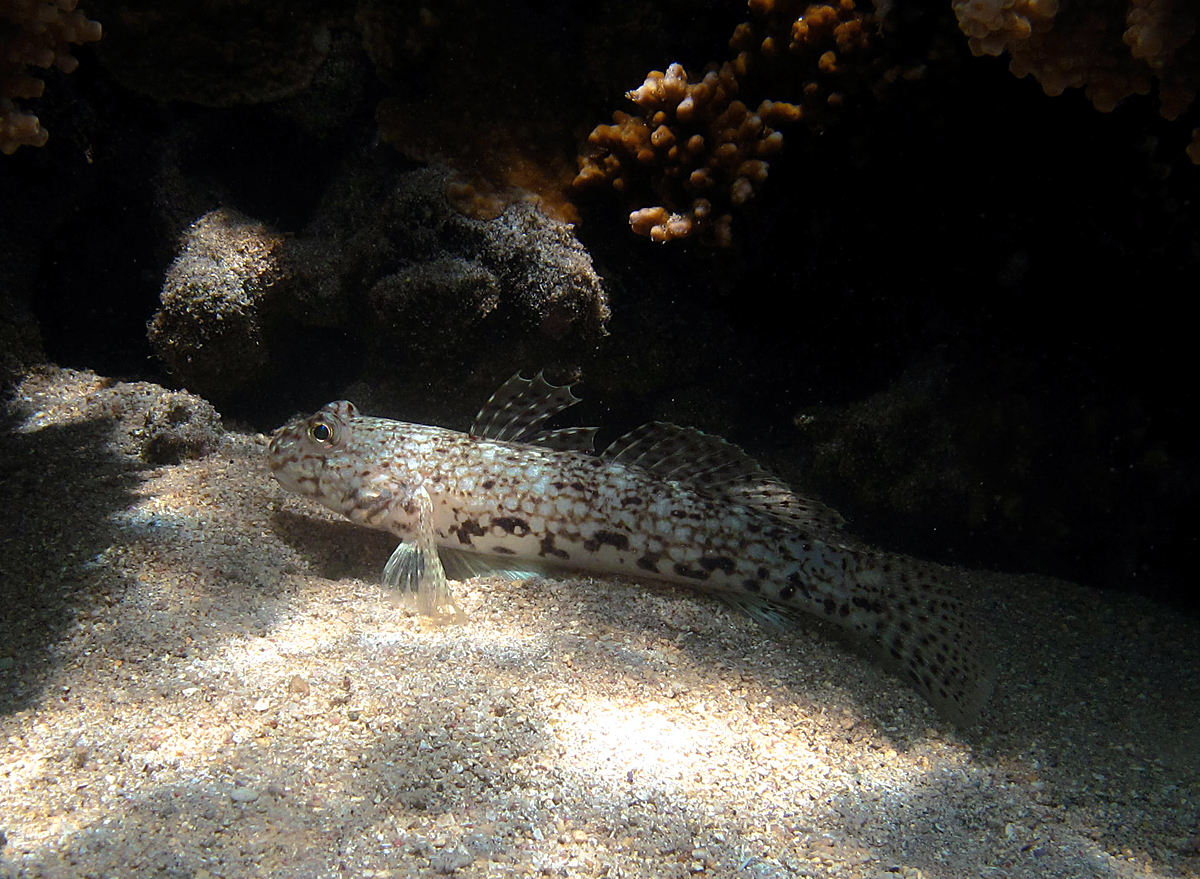
- Decorated goby (Istigobius decoratus)

Scientific classification
- Kingdom: Animalia
- Phylum: Chordata
- Class: Actinopterygii
- Division: Teleostei
- Order: Gobiiformes
- Family: Gobiidae
- Genus: Istigobius; Whitley, 1932

Type species
- Gobius (Istigobius) stephensoni, a synonym of Istiogobius ornatus Whitley, 1932

Synonyms
- Bikinigobius Herre, 1953; Innoculus Whitley, 1952; Pallidogobius Herre, 1953

= Istigobius =

Genus of fishes

Istigobius is a genus of gobies found in fresh, brackish and marine waters of the regions along the coasts of the Indian and western Pacific oceans.

== Species ==
There are currently 10 recognized species in this genus:

- Istigobius campbelli (D. S. Jordan & Snyder, 1901)
- Istigobius decoratus (Herre, 1927) (Decorated goby)
- Istigobius diadema (Steindachner, 1876) (Spectacled sandgoby)
- Istigobius goldmanni (Bleeker, 1852) (Goldman's goby)
- Istigobius hoesei Murdy & McEachran, 1982
- Istigobius hoshinonis (S. Tanaka (I), 1917)
- Istigobius nigroocellatus (Günther, 1873) (Black-spotted goby)
- Istigobius ornatus (Rüppell, 1830) (Ornate goby)
- Istigobius rigilius (Herre, 1953) (Rigilius goby)
- Istigobius spence (J. L. B. Smith, 1947) (Pearl goby)
