= Gobius rubropunctatus =

Conservation status
- Least Concern (IUCN 3.1)

Scientific classification
- Domain: Eukaryota
- Kingdom: Animalia
- Phylum: Chordata
- Class: Actinopterygii
- Order: Gobiiformes
- Family: Gobiidae
- Genus: Gobius
- Species: G. rubropunctatus

Binomial name
- Gobius rubropunctatus Delais, 1951

Species of fish

Gobius rubropunctatus is a species of goby native to inshore waters of the Atlantic Ocean near the coasts of Africa from Mauritania to Ghana down to a depth of about 70 metres (230 ft). This species can reach a length of 8 centimetres (3.1 in) TL.
