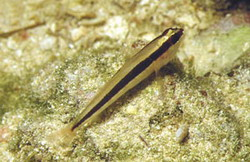

Conservation status
- Least Concern (IUCN 3.1)

Scientific classification
- Kingdom: Animalia
- Phylum: Chordata
- Class: Actinopterygii
- Order: Gobiiformes
- Family: Gobiidae
- Genus: Gobius
- Species: G. vittatus

Binomial name
- Gobius vittatus Vinciguerra, 1883

= Striped goby =

Species of fish

The striped goby (Gobius vittatus) is a species of goby native to the Mediterranean Sea where it occurs on coralline grounds at depths of from 15 to 85 metres (49 to 279 ft) though normally not deeper than 50 metres (160 ft). This species can reach a length of 5.8 centimetres (2.3 in) SL. This species can also be found in the aquarium trade.
