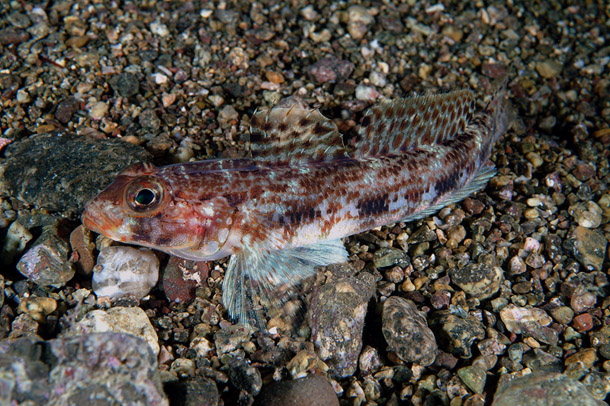

Conservation status
- Least Concern (IUCN 3.1)

Scientific classification
- Kingdom: Animalia
- Phylum: Chordata
- Class: Actinopterygii
- Order: Gobiiformes
- Family: Gobiidae
- Genus: Gobius
- Species: G. geniporus

Binomial name
- Gobius geniporus Valenciennes, 1837

Synonyms
- Gobius cruentatus geniporus (Valenciennes, 1837); Gobius arenae Bath, 1972

= Slender goby =

Species of fish

The slender goby (Gobius geniporus) is a species of goby endemic to the Mediterranean Sea where it can be found in inshore waters to a depth of about 30 metres (98 ft). It lives in areas with sandy or muddy substrates near beds of sea-grass. This species can reach a length of 16 centimetres (6.3 in) TL.
