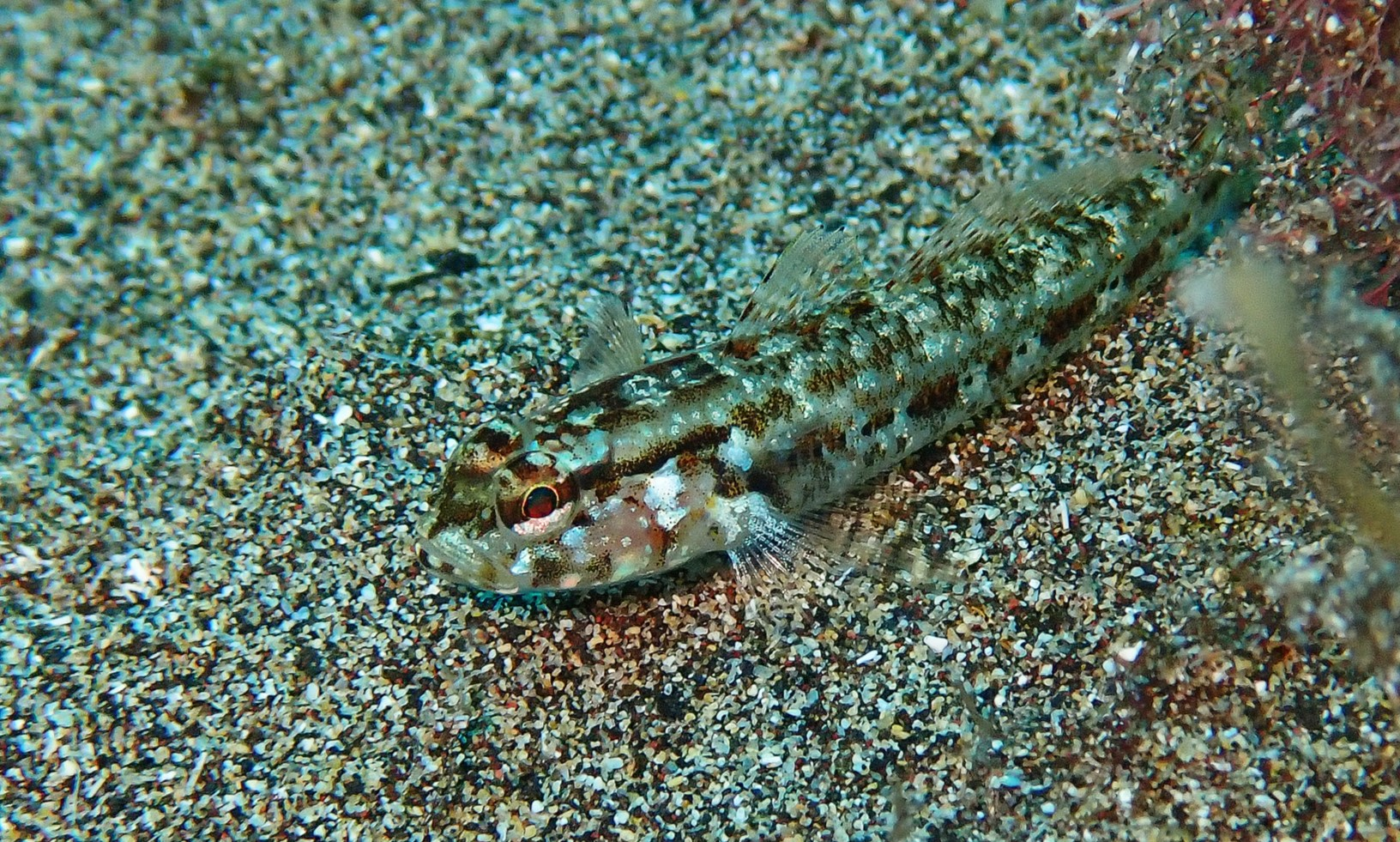

Conservation status
- Least Concern (IUCN 3.1)

Scientific classification
- Kingdom: Animalia
- Phylum: Chordata
- Class: Actinopterygii
- Order: Gobiiformes
- Family: Gobiidae
- Genus: Gobius
- Species: G. gasteveni

Binomial name
- Gobius gasteveni P. J. Miller, 1974

= Steven's goby =

Species of fish

Gobius gasteveni, Steven's goby, is a species of goby native to the eastern Atlantic Ocean where it is known to occur in the Irish Sea as far north as the Isle of Man, the western part of the English Channel south as far as Madeira and the Canary Islands. It can be found in areas with substrates of muddy sand with coarser deposits at depths of from 35 to 270 metres (115 to 886 ft). This species can reach a length of 12 centimetres (4.7 in) TL. The common name and the specific name both honour the British ichthyologist G. A. Steven BSc FRSE (1901–1958), of the Plymouth Marine Laboratory, who worked extensively on the fish fauna of the English Channel and who identified this species as being new to that area.
