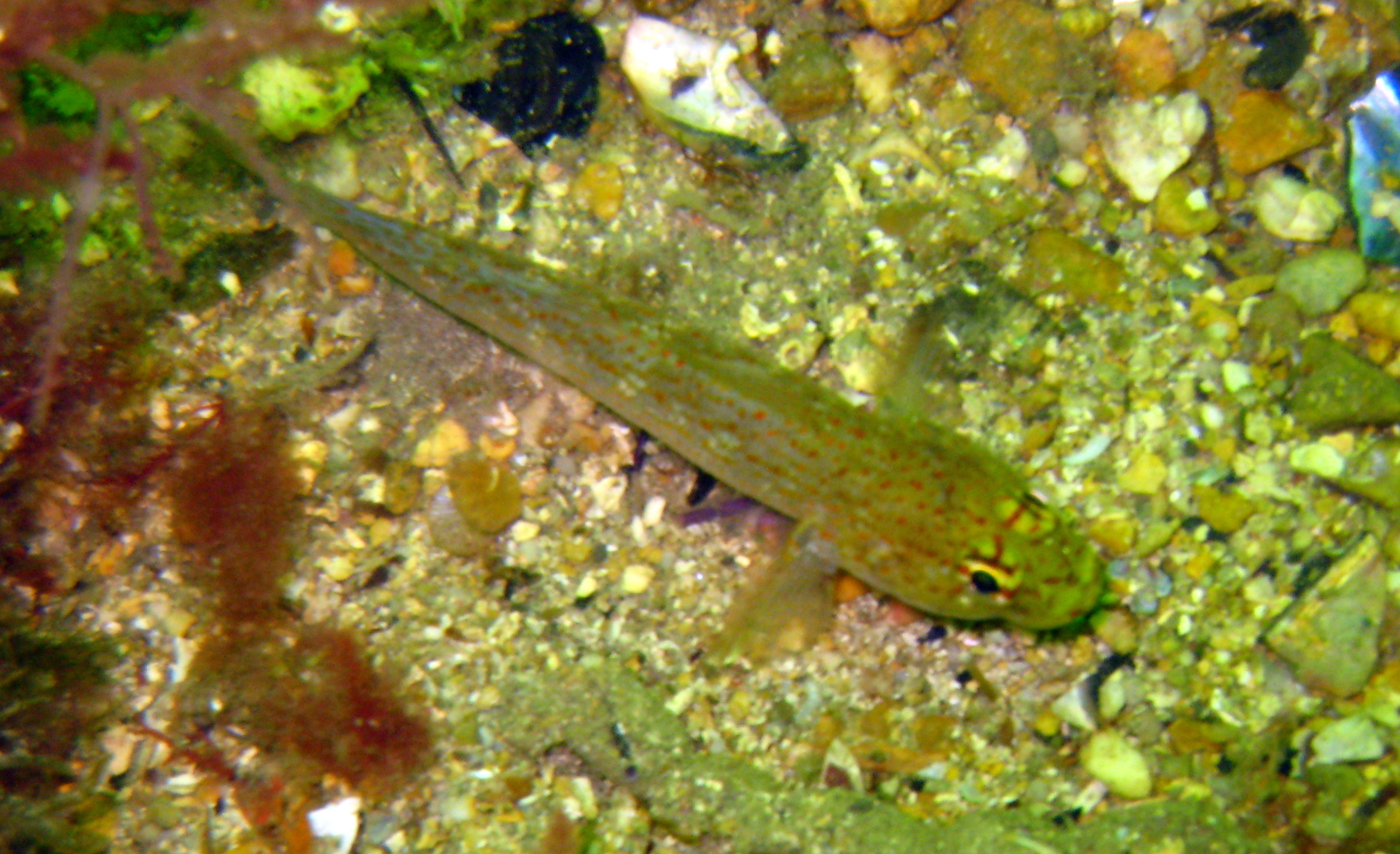

Conservation status
- Least Concern (IUCN 3.1)

Scientific classification
- Domain: Eukaryota
- Kingdom: Animalia
- Phylum: Chordata
- Class: Actinopterygii
- Order: Gobiiformes
- Family: Gobiidae
- Genus: Gobius
- Species: G. xanthocephalus

Binomial name
- Gobius xanthocephalus Heymer & Zander, 1992

= Yellow-headed goby =

Species of fish

The yellow-headed goby (Gobius xanthocephalus) is a species of goby native to the eastern Atlantic Ocean from northern Spain to Madeira and Canary Islands, and also in the Mediterranean Sea where it is found in inshore waters at depths of from 1 to 22 metres (3.3 to 72.2 ft) and can be found living under stones. This species can reach a length of 10 centimetres (3.9 in) TL.
