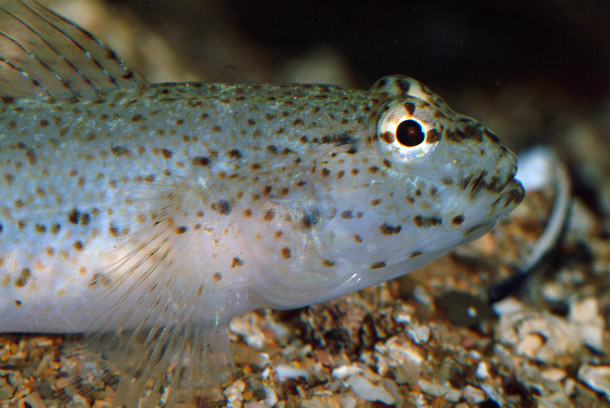
- The head of the Bucchich's goby

Conservation status
- Least Concern (IUCN 3.1)

Scientific classification
- Kingdom: Animalia
- Phylum: Chordata
- Class: Actinopterygii
- Order: Gobiiformes
- Family: Gobiidae
- Genus: Gobius
- Species: G. bucchichi

Binomial name
- Gobius bucchichi Steindachner, 1870

Synonyms
- Gobius bucchichii Steindachner, 1870; Gobius lynx Kessler, 1874; Gobius serotinus Sarato, 1891

= Bucchich's goby =

Species of fish

Bucchich's goby (Gobius bucchichi) is a species of goby native to the Eastern Mediterranean Sea (at least the Adriatic and Aegean Seas) and perhaps the Black Sea. It has traditionally been considered to be more widespread, but in 2016 the similar incognito goby (G. incognitus) was described. It had been confused with the Bucchich's goby and much information formerly published for this species is now considered to actually be for the incognito goby.

The Bucchich's goby prefers coastal waters with a sandy or muddy substrate with seagrass patches or tide pools at depths of from 1 to 30 m (3.3–98.4 ft). Its diet consists of polychaete worms, amphipods, molluscs and algae. This species can reach a total length of up to 10 cm (3.9 in).
