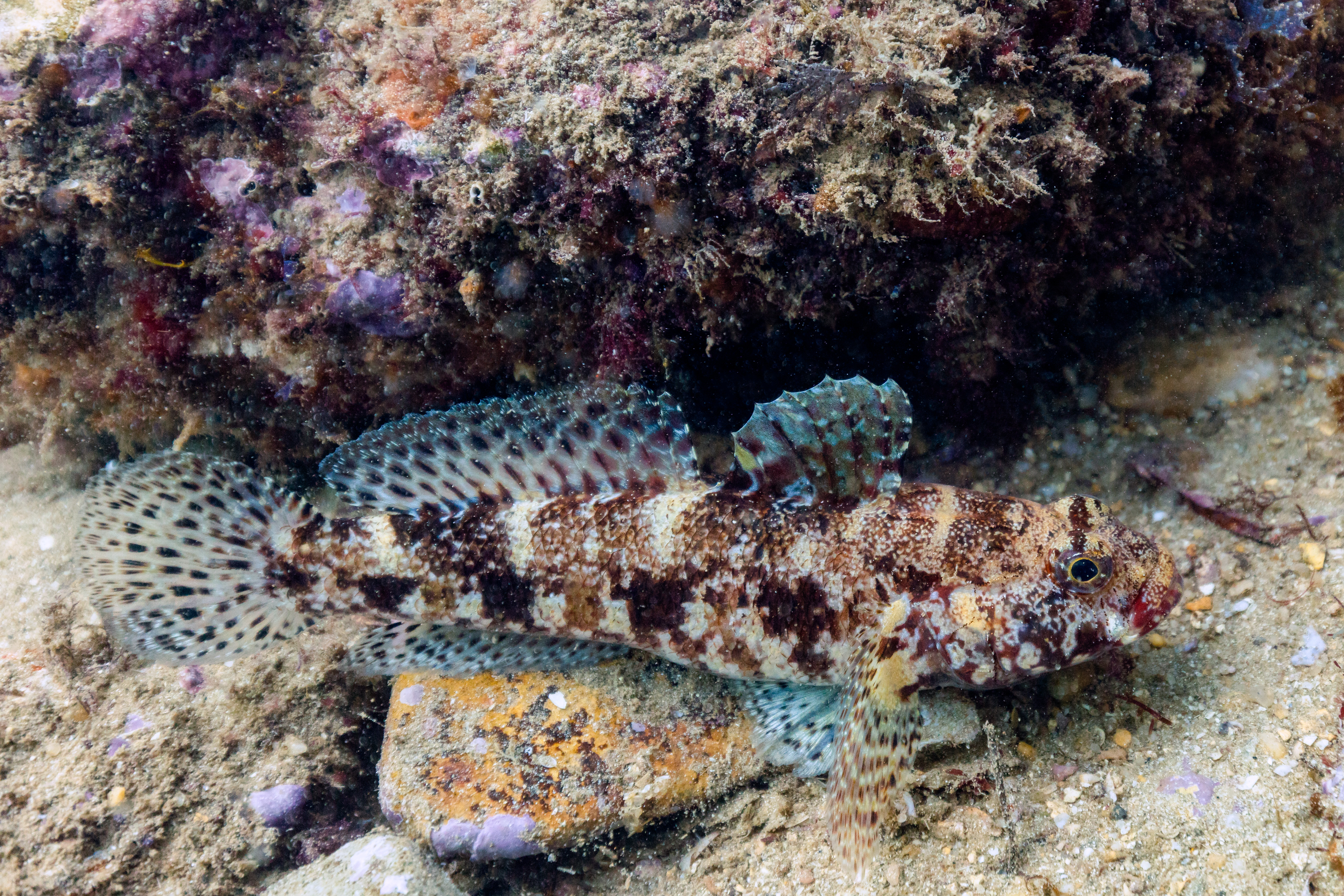

Conservation status
- Least Concern (IUCN 3.1)

Scientific classification
- Domain: Eukaryota
- Kingdom: Animalia
- Phylum: Chordata
- Class: Actinopterygii
- Order: Gobiiformes
- Family: Gobiidae
- Genus: Gobius
- Species: G. cruentatus

Binomial name
- Gobius cruentatus J. F. Gmelin, 1789

Synonyms
- Gobius rubens Rafinesque, 1810 (ambiguous name)

= Red-mouthed goby =

Species of fish

The red-mouthed goby (Gobius cruentatus) is a species of goby native to the Eastern Atlantic Ocean from southwestern Ireland to the coasts of Morocco and Senegal, and also in the Mediterranean Sea where it occurs in inshore waters at depths of from 15 to 40 metres (49 to 131 ft) in areas with rocky or sandy substrates or in meadows of sea-grass. This species can reach a length of 18 centimetres (7.1 in) TL. It may also be found in the aquarium trade.
