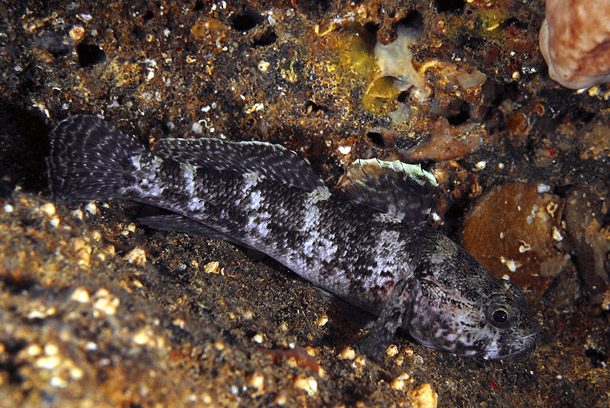
- Gobius paganellus

Scientific classification
- Kingdom: Animalia
- Phylum: Chordata
- Class: Actinopterygii
- Division: Teleostei
- Order: Gobiiformes
- Family: Gobiidae
- Subfamily: Gobiinae
- Genus: Gobius; Linnaeus, 1758

Type species
- Gobius niger Linnaeus, 1758

Synonyms
- Cabotia de Buen, 1930; Cabotichthys Whitley, 1940; Fagea de Buen, 1940; Macrogobius de Buen, 1930; Zostericola Iljin, 1927; Zosterisessor Whitley, 1935

= Gobius =

Gobius Temporal range: 23–0 Ma Early Miocene to Present

Genus of fishes

Gobius is a genus of fish in the family Gobiidae native to fresh, brackish and marine waters of and around Europe, Africa and Asia. It contains the typical gobies, being the type genus of the formerly recognised subfamily Gobiinae and family and the namesake genus of its order Gobiiformes.

== Species ==
There are currently 25 recognized species in this genus:

- Gobius ater Bellotti, 1888 (Bellotti's goby)
- Gobius ateriformis Brito & P. J. Miller, 2001
- Gobius auratus A. Risso, 1810 (Golden goby)
- Gobius bucchichi Steindachner, 1870 (Bucchich's goby)
- Gobius cobitis Pallas, 1814 (Giant goby)
- Gobius couchi P. J. Miller & El-Tawil, 1974 (Couch's goby)
- Gobius cruentatus J. F. Gmelin, 1789 (Red-mouthed goby)
- Gobius fallax Sarato, 1889 (Sarato's goby)
- Gobius gasteveni P. J. Miller, 1974 (Steven's goby)
- Gobius geniporus Valenciennes, 1837 (Slender goby)
- Gobius incognitus Kovačić & Šanda, 2016
- Gobius kolombatovici Kovačić & P. J. Miller, 2000
- Gobius leucomelas W. K. H. Peters, 1868 (Species inquirenda)
- Gobius luteus Kolombatović, 1891
- Gobius niger Linnaeus, 1758 (Black goby)
- Gobius ophiocephalus Pallas, 1814 (Grass goby)
- Gobius paganellus Linnaeus, 1758 (Rock goby)
- Gobius roulei F. de Buen, 1928 (Roule's goby)
- Gobius rubropunctatus Delais, 1951
- Gobius salamansa Iglésias & Frotté, 2015 (Salamansa goby)
- Gobius scorteccii Poll, 1961
- Gobius senegambiensis Metzelaar, 1919
- Gobius tetrophthalmus Brito & P. J. Miller, 2001
- Gobius tropicus Osbeck, 1765 (Species inquirenda)
- Gobius vittatus Vinciguerra, 1883 (Striped goby)
- Gobius xanthocephalus Heymer & Zander, 1992 (Yellow-headed goby)
- Gobius xoriguer Iglésias, Vukić & Šanda, 2021 (Kestrel goby)

Synonyms

- Gobius hypselosoma Bleeker, 1867; valid as Awaous aeneofuscus
- Gobius koseirensis Klunzinger, 1871; valid as Favonigobius reichei
- Gobius strictus Fage, 1907; valid as G. cruentatus (Schmidt's goby)

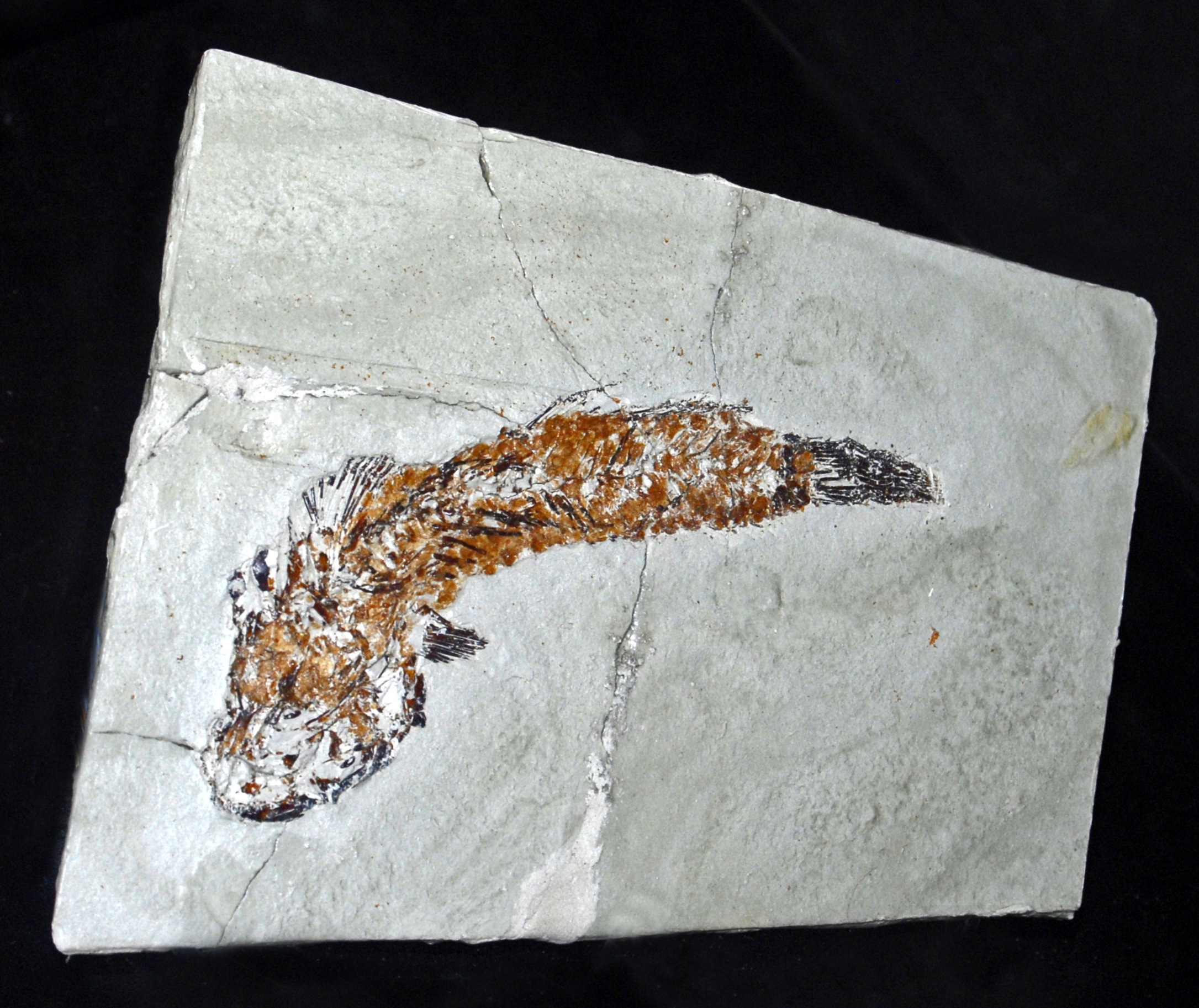
Fossil of Gobius ignotus

Fossil species

- †Gobius aidouri Arambourg, 1927
- †Gobius anthonyi Arambourg, 1927
- †Gobius atlanticus Weiler, 1959
- †Gobius brivesi Arambourg, 1927
- †Gobius bucchichi Steindachner, 1870
- †Gobius crenelatus Weiler, 1943
- †Gobius dorsolobatus Weiler, 1943
- †Gobius ehrmanni Arambourg, 1927
- †Gobius gracilis Weiler, 1959
- †Gobius ignotus Gaudant, 1976
- †Gobius ilovajskii Bogatshov, 1955
- †Gobius jarosi Reichenbacher et al., 2018
- †Gobius macrurus Agassiz, 1835
- †Gobius obliquus Frost, 1925
- †Gobius orientalis Vorstman, 1927
- †Gobius preangerensis Vorstman, 1927
- †Gobius pretiosus Prochazka, 1893
- †Gobius razelaini Arambourg, 1927
- †Gobius tankilensis Vorstman, 1927
- †Gobius tenuis Weiler, 1943
- †Gobius triangularis Weiler, 1943
- †Gobius truncatus Schwarzhans, 1978
- †Gobius vicinalis Koken, 1891
- †Gobius weileri Bauza-Rullan, 1955
- †Gobius xiphurus Arambourg, 1927
