= Ea1 =

Ion channel toxin

Identifiers
3D model (JSmol)	Interactive image
- SMILES: N[C@@]([H])(C)C(=O)NCC(=O)NCC(=O)N[C@@]([H])(CCCCN)C(=O)N[C@@]([H])(CO)C(=O)N[C@@]([H])([C@]([H])(O)C)C(=O)N[C@@]([H])(CS)C(=O)N[C@@]([H])(CS)C(=O)N1[C@@]([H])(CCC1)C(=O)N[C@@]([H])(CS)C(=O)N[C@@]([H])(C)C(=O)N[C@@]([H])(CCSC)C(=O)N[C@@]([H])(CS)C(=O)N[C@@]([H])(CCCCN)C(=O)N[C@@]([H])(Cc1ccc(O)cc1)C(=O)N[C@@]([H])([C@]([H])(O)C)C(=O)N[C@@]([H])(C)C(=O)NCC(=O)N[C@@]([H])(CS)C(=O)N1[C@@]([H])(CCC1)C(=O)N[C@@]([H])(CC(=CN2)C1=C2C=CC=C1)C(=O)NCC(=O)N[C@@]([H])(CCC(=O)N)C(=O)N[C@@]([H])(CS)C(=O)N[C@@]([H])(C)C(=O)N[C@@]([H])(CC1=CN=C-N1)C(=O)N[C@@]([H])(CC1=CN=C-N1)C(=O)N[C@@]([H])(CS)C(=O)NCC(=O)N[C@@]([H])(CS)C(=O)N[C@@]([H])(CO)C(=O)O
- Except where otherwise noted, data are given for materials in their standard state (at 25 °C [77 °F], 100 kPa). Infobox references

Ea1, formerly known as PaTx, is a type 3 sea anemone channel toxin from the sea anemone species Entacmaea actinostoloides considered to interact with receptor site 3 in voltage-gated sodium channels. Ea1 toxin functions via inhibition of the inactivation of these channels, thereby causing sustained sodium currents in the cell.

== Etymology ==
Ea1 is an acronym for the species the toxin originated from, Entacmaea actinostoloides. The toxin's prior name, PaTx, is derived from the prior name of the species; Parasicyonis actinostoloides for Pa, with the Tx meaning 'toxin'.

== Sources ==
Ea1 is isolated from the venom of the sea anemone species Entacmaea actinostoloides. Entacmaea actinostoloides, also called Entacmaea quadricolor, is commonly referred to as the bubble-tip anemone.

== Chemistry ==
Ea1 is a type 3 sea anemone sodium channel toxin. While type 1 and 2 sea anemone toxins are usually composed of 46-49 amino acid residues, Ea1 is a miniprotein comprising 31 amino acid residues. It is highly homologous to a number of other type 3 sea anemone toxins. Er I, sourced from the species Entacmaea ramsayi, differs from Ea1 in having an additional glutamate at the end of its sequence. Da I, and Da II, which are sourced from the species Dofleinia armata, differ from Ea1 by four residues. Av3, sourced from the species Anemonia viridis, differs greatly in its amino acid sequence from Ea1. Despite also being a type 3 sea anemone toxin, it shares at most about 50% of its residues, and unlike the previously named toxins contains six instead of eight cysteine residues. In Ea1, the cysteine residues were found to form four disulfide bridges, which is believed to contribute to its heat-stability, as half of its activity is retained after one hour of heating at 97 °C (206.6 °F).

Amino Acid Sequence of Ea1
AGGKSTCCPCAMCKYTAGCPWGQCAHHCGCS

== Target and mode of action ==
Sea anemone species including Entacmaea quadricolor contain numerous voltage -ated sodium channel toxins considered to act on receptor site 3 of voltage -ated sodium channels. Ea1 is found to have selectivity for crustaceans. Ea1 works in a biphasic manner, the first phase delaying the process of inactivating voltage -ated sodium channels while the second phase decreases the rate of rise of action potentials, thereby increasing neuronal excitability. Ea1 also depolarizes resting membrane potential, further increasing neuronal excitability.

== Toxicity ==
Inhibition of sodium channel inactivation can cause paralysis or death. Ea1's toxicity has been tested in crustacea, where it was found to have an LD_{50} value of 10 µg/kg. However, even as little as 10nM has been found to produce increased excitability and repetitive firing in crayfish giant axons.
