= Av3 =

Polypeptide neurotoxin

Identifiers
3D model (JSmol)	Interactive image
- InChI: InChI=1S/C125H171N35O36S6/c1-62(2)102(124(195)196)156-109(180)74(19-7-8-36-126)143-117(188)90-20-10-38-157(90)100(171)53-139-107(178)84-56-197-200-59-87-114(185)145-77(42-63-24-28-67(163)29-25-63)110(181)146-78(44-65-47-133-72-17-5-3-14-69(65)72)105(176)136-49-96(167)135-50-97(168)142-88-60-201-202-61-89(123(194)160-41-13-23-93(160)120(191)154-87)155-116(187)86(153-113(184)83(55-162)150-103(174)71(127)16-9-37-132-125(130)131)58-199-198-57-85(115(186)149-81(43-64-26-30-68(164)31-27-64)121(192)158-39-11-21-91(158)118(189)144-75(33-35-101(172)173)104(175)137-52-99(170)141-82(54-161)112(183)151-84)152-111(182)80(46-95(129)166)147-108(179)76(32-34-94(128)165)140-98(169)51-138-106(177)79(45-66-48-134-73-18-6-4-15-70(66)73)148-119(190)92-22-12-40-159(92)122(88)193/h3-6,14-15,17-18,24-31,47-48,62,71,74-93,102,133-134,161-164H,7-13,16,19-23,32-46,49-61,126-127H2,1-2H3,(H2,128,165)(H2,129,166)(H,135,167)(H,136,176)(H,137,175)(H,138,177)(H,139,178)(H,140,169)(H,141,170)(H,142,168)(H,143,188)(H,144,189)(H,145,185)(H,146,181)(H,147,179)(H,148,190)(H,149,186)(H,150,174)(H,151,183)(H,152,182)(H,153,184)(H,154,191)(H,155,187)(H,156,180)(H,172,173)(H,195,196)(H4,130,131,132)/t71-,74-,75-,76-,77-,78-,79-,80-,81-,82-,83-,84-,85-,86-,87-,88-,89-,90-,91-,92-,93-,102-/m0/s1 Key: SLHSRKFDWSPSGV-NRJIIXGOSA-N
- SMILES: N[C@@]([H])(CCCNC(=N)N)C(=O)N[C@@]([H])(CO)C(=O)N[C@@]([H])(CS3)C(=O)N[C@@]([H])(CS4)C(=O)N1[C@@]([H])(CCC1)C(=O)N[C@@]([H])(CS5)C(=O)N[C@@]([H])(Cc1ccc(O)cc1)C(=O)N[C@@]([H])(CC(=CN2)C1=C2C=CC=C1)C(=O)NCC(=O)NCC(=O)N[C@@]([H])(CS4)C(=O)N1[C@@]([H])(CCC1)C(=O)N[C@@]([H])(CC(=CN2)C1=C2C=CC=C1)C(=O)NCC(=O)N[C@@]([H])(CCC(=O)N)C(=O)N[C@@]([H])(CC(=O)N)C(=O)N[C@@]([H])(CS3)C(=O)N[C@@]([H])(Cc1ccc(O)cc1)C(=O)N1[C@@]([H])(CCC1)C(=O)N[C@@]([H])(CCC(=O)O)C(=O)NCC(=O)N[C@@]([H])(CO)C(=O)N[C@@]([H])(CS5)C(=O)NCC(=O)N1[C@@]([H])(CCC1)C(=O)N[C@@]([H])(CCCCN)C(=O)N[C@@]([H])(C(C)C)C(=O)O
- Except where otherwise noted, data are given for materials in their standard state (at 25 °C [77 °F], 100 kPa). Infobox references

Chemical properties of ATX III
- Molecular formula: C_{125}H_{171}N_{35}O_{36}S_{6}
- Number of atoms: 202
- Molecular mass: 2.94 kDa
- pI: 8.1
- Amino acid sequence (27 residues): R S C C P C Y W G G C P W G Q N C Y P E G S C G P K V
- Modifications: Disulfide bonds: 3-17, 4-11, 6-22

Av3 (also: ATX III, Delta-actitoxin-Avd2a, Delta-AITX-AVd2a, neurotoxin 3) is a 27-residue polypeptide neurotoxin produced by Anemonia viridis (also Anemonia sulcata). Av3 produces neurotoxic symptoms in crustaceans by reducing sodium channel inactivation, which prolongs the action potential in excitable tissues.

== Etymology ==
Av3 is an abbreviation from Anemonia viridis toxin 3. Originally Av3 was called ATX-III, which is an acronym for Anemonia sulcata toxin 3. In recent literature, researchers use the species name Anemonia viridis as a synonym for Anemonia sulcata and use the abbreviation Av3 to refer to the neurotoxin, whether Anemonia viridis and Anemonia sulcata should be recognized as synonyms remains a matter of dispute.

== Source ==
Av3 is isolated from the venom of the sea anemones Anemonia viridis and Anemonia sulcata. Av3 was the third toxin isolated from the venom of Anemonia sulcata, the first and second being ATX-I and ATX-II.

== Chemistry ==
Av3 is a small neurotoxin consisting of 27 amino acids stabilized by three disulfide bridges. The polypeptide contains no regular α-helix or β-sheet and instead consists of a network of reverse turns. The molecule can be divided into three regions: a polar N-terminal dipeptide, a predominantly hydrophobic central region (residues 3-14), and a polar C-terminal segment.

Av3 is structurally unique compared to bioactive surfaces of toxins with a similar target and consists mainly of aromatic residues as well as glycine residues. Glycine residues make up nearly 20% of the total amino acid content.

== Target ==
Av3 acts on invertebrate voltage-gated sodium channels (Na_{v}). Specifically, Av3 binds to a cleft in S6 of domain I and likely also has contact with the S4 region of domain IV, which is proximal to the pore module of domain I.

Av3 has an effect on sodium channels in insects, but not on mammalian sodium channels. At 10 μM, Av3 has no effect on the mammalian Na_{v} subtypes: Na_{v}1.2, Na_{v}1.4, and Na_{v}1.6, and a 'negligible effect' on mammalian subtype Na_{v}1.5. Another study also found that 10 μM Av3 had no effect on the Na_{v}1.2a channel, while the toxin did inhibit Drosophila melanogaster DmNa_{v}1 inactivation. A similar effect on sodium channel activity is also found for crayfish neurons.

Competition binding assays demonstrate that Av3 competes with the scorpion α-toxin LqhαIT, which is known to bind site-3 on the extracellular region of the α-subunit of insect Na_{v}s, confirming the classification of Av3 as a site-3 toxin.

== Mode of action ==
Av3 selectively targets voltage-gated sodium channels (Na_{v}) on the extracellular region of the α-subunit. Through this interaction, the toxin functions as a gating modifier that inhibits the fast inactivation, increases peak sodium current at more negative membrane potentials, and shifts activation to lower voltages, resulting in a sustained inward sodium current and prolonged action potentials.

The binding of Av3 is voltage dependent: depolarizing the membrane increases the toxin's dissociation rate from the channel, indicating stronger interactions with sodium channels in their resting and early open states than when they are strongly activated. For example, the dissociation rate increases by approximately two orders of magnitude when the membrane potential is shifted from –100 mV to 0 mV.

In crayfish neurons, it was found that Av3 shifts the voltage dependence of activation to more negative potentials, causing voltage channels to open earlier and neurons to become hyperexcitable.

These combined effects initially lead to repetitive firing, but as depolarization persists and sodium channels fail to recover, action potential propagation is disrupted, consistent with the paralysis observed in crustaceans.

== Toxicity ==
Av3 produces neurotoxic symptoms in crustaceans, typically causing cramp-like reactions followed by paralysis of the extremities when injected into Carcinus maenas. The toxicity reflects the toxin's high selectivity for invertebrate sodium channels. Although the symptoms in arthropods are well described, quantitative LD_{50} data have not been reported. In contrast, i.p. LD_{50} in mice is greater than 18 mg/kg, indicating low toxicity in mammals.
