= AION Labs =

Israeli venture capital firm

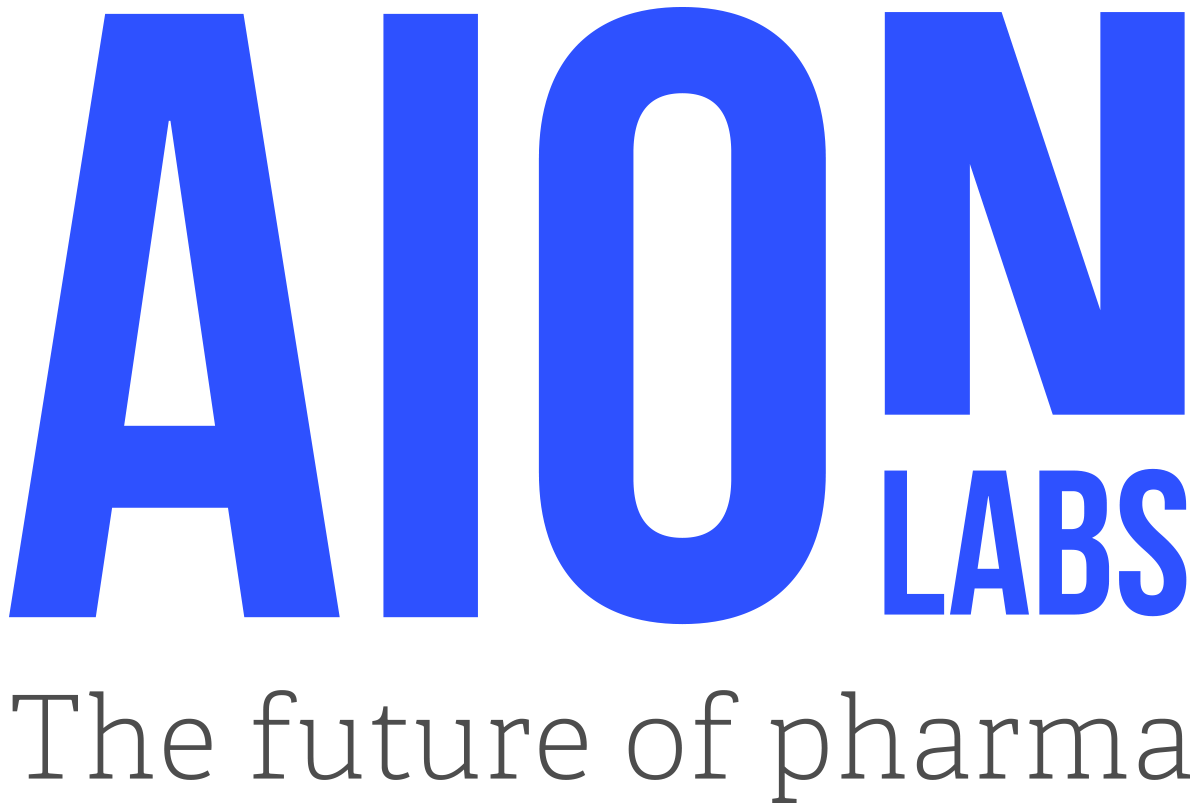
- Type: Venture Studio
- Industry: AI, Machine Learning, Pharmaceutical Discovery, Drug Development
- Founded: 2021; 5 years ago
- Key people: Mati Gill (CEO), Yair Benita (CTO)
- Website: aionlabs.com

AION Labs is an Israeli venture studio focused on the adoption of artificial intelligence (AI) and machine learning (ML) in pharmaceutical discovery and development processes.

It is backed by eight major companies in the pharmaceutical, technology, and investing sectors. This partnership includes pharmaceutical companies AstraZeneca, Merck KGaA, Pfizer, and Teva Pharmaceuticals; venture capital firms Israel Biotech Fund and Amiti Ventures; strategic partner Amazon Web Services; and independent research institute BioMed X, with support from the Israel Innovation Authority.

== History ==
AION Labs was formed after winning a government tender in 2020, bringing together AstraZeneca, Merck KGaA, Pfizer, and Teva—from the pharmaceutical sector—with Amazon Web Services (AWS), a technology and cloud computing provider, and biotech and deeptech VC firms Israel Biotech Fund and Amiti Ventures. The Management team of the company includes CEO Mati Gill, CTO Yair Benita, Dr. Sharon Kredo-Russo (VP Ideation), Sharon Gour Arie (VP Value Creation), Einav Daniel (Finance Director), Yael Spector (Scientific Project Manager), Moran Mamluk (Administrative Operations Manager), and Dr. Arnon Fluksman (Scientific Analyst).

In 2022 and 2023, it was nominated for the Prix Galien USA Award for its work in AI and healthcare and awarded "Most Valuable Collaboration Award" by Reuters Pharma Awards USA 2022.

In February 2023, AION Labs introduced DenovAI, a venture focused on antibody discovery through an AI-powered computational platform. DenovAI's technology is designed to discover antibodies de novo, expediting and economizing the process.

In January 2024, AION Labs unveiled TenAces Biosciences, a venture in the field of molecular glue discovery using machine learning. Formed from AION Labs' initiative to develop AI platforms for targeted protein degradation, TenAces focuses on accelerating the discovery and development of new molecular glue therapies.

In February 2024, the challenge of developing an AI/ML platform for Targeting RNA with Small Molecules was launched via a Call for Applications.

In March 2024, it launched CombinAble.AI, a startup resulting from an AION Labs' startup challenge aimed at the antibody design process.

In April 2024, AION Labs launched a global challenge seeking scientists to develop an AI/machine learning platform for RNA targeting with small molecules.

In October 2024, AION Labs launched ProPhet, a startup using machine learning technologies, including diffusion models and large language models, to identify active small molecules for drug discovery, particularly targeting proteins with limited information.

In December 2024, Promise Bio, an AION Labs portfolio company, emerged from stealth mode with an $8.3 million Seed investment led by Awz Ventures, with funding from AstraZeneca, Pfizer, and the Israel Innovation Authority. The startup, recognized among TechCrunch's "51 Most Disruptive Startups of 2024," developed an AI-powered epiproteomic platform for precision medicine in autoimmune diseases.

In February 2025, AION Labs was included in TBRC Business Research's report on key players in the global Generative Artificial Intelligence in Material Science market.

In March 2025, AION Labs and BioMed X launched a global call for applications titled "Generative AI for Novel Target Combinations," seeking to develop an AI platform to identify and validate target combinations for multispecific biologic drugs targeting cancer, cardiovascular-kidney-metabolic diseases, and immune disorders.

== Activities ==
AION Labs focuses on developing AI and computational technologies in drug discovery and development in the pharmaceutical industry. It aids in the creation of companies in the pharmaceutical sector. The studio's venture creation model leverages the BioMed X model and focuses on:

- identifying R&D challenges in drug discovery and development based on scientific/technological business opportunities and market needs;
- assembling multidisciplinary teams of scientist-founders and innovators through an application process and a week-long innovation workshop;
- offering resources, including an initial pre-seed investment of at least $1M, mentoring, proprietary data and access to an industry expert and investor network.

== Investments ==
=== DenovAI ===
DenovAI focuses on expediting drug discovery by creating an AI-based platform designed to generate high-affinity therapeutic antibodies and miniprotein binders for specific protein targets from scratch.

=== TenAces ===
TenAces Biosciences is focused on advancing the development of molecular glue therapeutics designed for targeted protein degradation. Employing a data-centric approach and machine learning, TenAces explores protein interactions, pairs, and multi-dimensional features to predict new molecular glues to enhance therapeutic outcomes.

=== Combinable.AI ===
Combinable.AI focuses on addressing challenges in pharmaceutical development and manufacturing by developing an in silico method for optimizing antibody properties simultaneously. This approach aims to speed up the drug discovery process by identifying multiple candidates that achieve a balanced profile across diverse characteristics, reducing the reliance on trial-and-error methods.

=== Omec.AI ===
Omec.AI focuses on improving the likelihood of success for drug candidates in clinical trials through the analysis of pre-clinical safety and efficacy data. The platform builds computational models to detect potential safety concerns and efficacy issues early in the drug development process.

=== Promise Bio ===
Promise Bio is developing a platform for unbiased, broad-range epiproteomic analysis focused on precision medicine applications for complex chronic conditions, including autoimmune diseases. Their cloud-based system is designed to provide timely clinical insights that enable personalized treatment approaches and response predictions.

=== Cellyrix ===
Cellyrix develops cancer treatment approaches by utilizing single-cell RNA sequencing and artificial intelligence to analyze tumor heterogeneity. Their platform aims to create targeted therapies addressing the underlying causes of disease progression, treatment resistance, and relapse to improve patient outcomes.

=== Cassidy Bio ===
Cassidy Bio, currently operating in stealth mode, specializes in advancing genome editing therapeutics, operating in stealth mode to develop novel treatments leveraging gene modification technologies.

=== ProPhet ===
ProPhet uses state-of-the-art Machine Learning technologies, including diffusion models and large language models, to identify active small molecules for drug discovery.
