= Gustav Janeček =

Czech-Croatian chemist and pharmacist, rector of the University of Zagreb

- Born: 30 November 1848; Konopiště, Bohemia, Austrian Empire
- Died: 8 September 1929 (aged 80); Zagreb, Kingdom of Yugoslavia
- Education: Charles University (PhD, 1875)
- Known for: Establishing modern university chemistry in Croatia; founding the wholesale drug company Isis (1918, later Medika), and co-founding the pharmaceutical factory Kaštel d.d. (1921), predecessor of PLIVA
- Scientific career
- Fields: Chemistry, Pharmacy
- Workplaces: University of Zagreb

Gustav Janeček (30 November 1848 – 8 September 1929) was a Czech-born Croatian chemist and pharmacist. He served as rector of the University of Zagreb and president of the Croatian Academy of Sciences and Arts (then JAZU). He is credited with establishing modern university chemistry and pharmacy teaching in Croatia and with helping to develop the country's early pharmaceutical industry through the firms Isis and Kaštel (the latter later becoming PLIVA).

== Early life and education ==
Janeček was born in Konopiště, Bohemia, Austrian Empire (now part of Benešov in the Czech Republic). After pharmacy training and assistant work in Prague, he completed a doctorate in chemistry at the Charles University in 1875 and spent several years in Vienna associated with the laboratory of Adolf Lieben.

== Academic career ==
In 1879 Janeček was appointed associate professor of chemistry at the University of Zagreb and became full professor in 1881. He organized modern chemical studies in Croatia, introducing physical chemistry and helping to found the University Pharmacy Course (1882), the precursor of today’s Faculty of Pharmacy and Biochemistry. He directed the Institute of Chemistry for decades and served as rector in 1908–1909. Sources name him the founder of modern university chemistry teaching in Croatia and note his role in embedding Mendeleev's periodic table in instruction.

== Industry ==
Parallel to his academic work, Janeček helped initiate Croatian pharmaceutical production. In 1918 he founded the wholesale drug company Isis (today Medika). In 1921 he co-founded the pharmaceutical factory Kaštel d.d. in Karlovac as a joint venture with Isis and Budapest-based Chinoin, and served as the company's first president of the board. The name Kaštel was taken from the castle where it began operations. The castle still stands today in the Drežnik–Hrnetić district of Karlovac; the company kept its name after moving production to Zagreb in 1927. It was only in 1941 that it was renamed PLIVA as an acronym for the State Institute for Production of Medicines and Vaccines.

== Societies ==
Janeček became a member of the Yugoslav (now Croatian) Academy of Sciences and Arts in 1882 and served as its president from 1921 to 1924. He was active in environmental and public initiatives, notably co-founding in 1893 the Society for the Arrangement and Beautification of the Plitvice Lakes and serving as its long-time vice-president.

== Research and publications ==
Janeček’s research spanned inorganic, analytical, physical and forensic chemistry, including water analysis and electrolysis, and he authored university textbooks and laboratory manuals. Overviews of Croatian chemistry place his work at the transition to industrial research in the interwar period and credit him with raising the level of pharmacy teaching and literature. A dedicated monograph collects essays on his life and work.

== Personal life ==
Janeček settled in Zagreb in the late 1870s. In 1900 he bought a property at Labudovac in the Plitvice Lakes area, where he arranged a small restaurant and guesthouse and planted trees. He had at least one child, Dragutin (Dragan) Janeček (1879–1914), a lawyer and Sokol leader. Janeček died in Zagreb on 8 September 1929. He is buried at Zagreb’s Mirogoj Cemetery (grave 32–I–17). A memorial plaque is dedicated to him at the Plitvice Lakes, where a stairway (Janeček’s Stairs) is named in his honour.

== Legacy ==
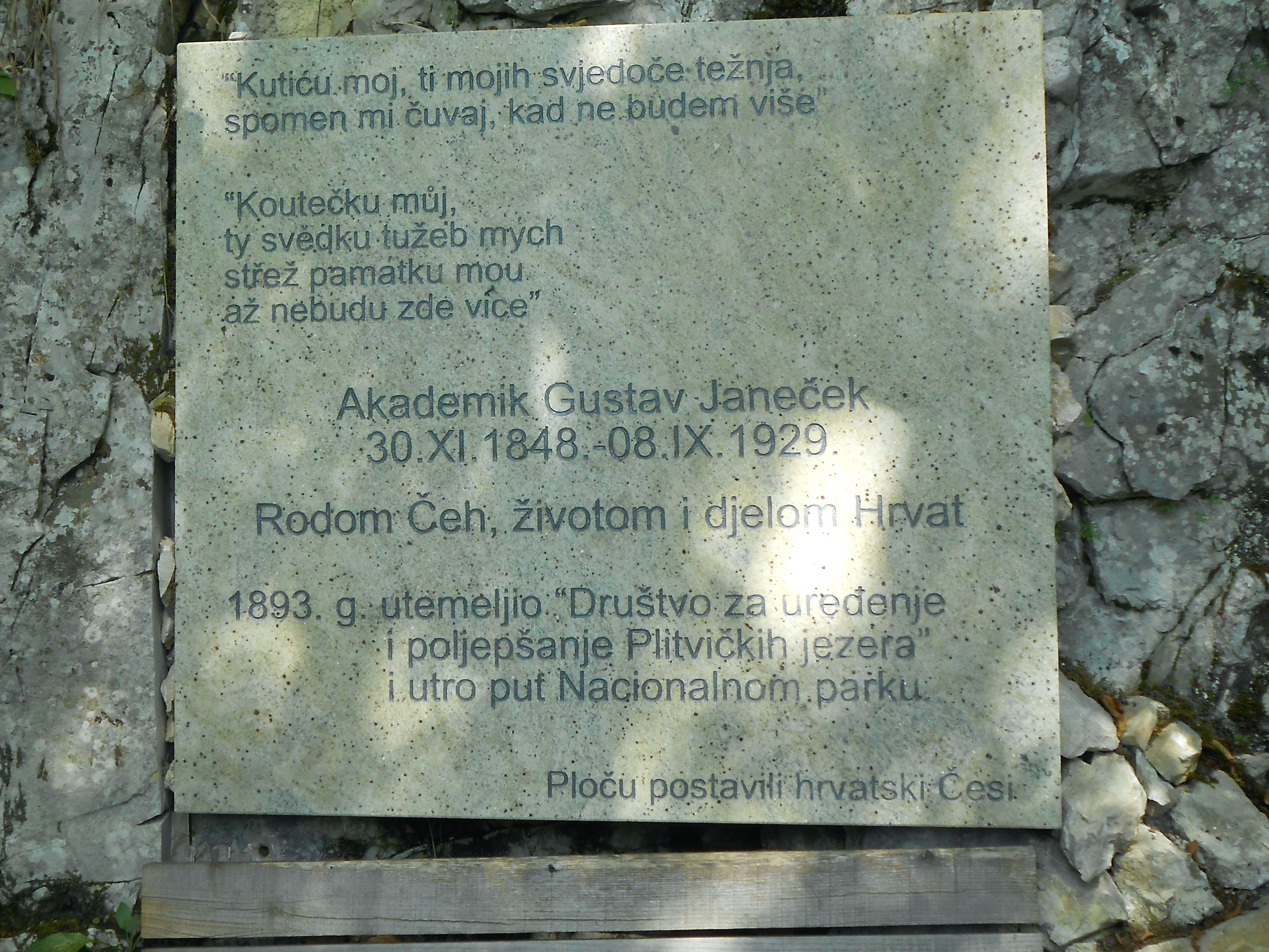
Memorial plaque to Gustav Janeček at Plitvice Lakes.

Independent histories of Croatian pharmacy and chemistry and biographical dictionaries portray Janeček as a central organizer of higher chemical education and an initiator of domestic pharmaceutical manufacturing through Isis and Kaštel.
