= Barr Pharmaceuticals =

Former multinational specialty and generic drug manufacturer

Barr Pharmaceuticals, Inc.
- Industry: Pharmaceutical industry
- Founded: 1970; 56 years ago
- Defunct: December 23, 2008; 17 years ago
- Fate: Acquired by Teva Pharmaceutical Industries
- Successor: Teva Active Pharmaceutical Ingredients
- Headquarters: Montvale, New Jersey, United States
- Area served: Worldwide
- Key people: Bruce L. Downey, Chairman & CEO; William T. McKee, CFO
- Products: Generic drugs
- Number of employees: 8,900 (2007)

Barr Pharmaceuticals was an American specialty and generic drug manufacturer with operations in 30 countries. Approximately 75% of the company's revenues came from the sale of generic drugs, including 18% of sales which were from the sale of oral contraceptive pills.

It was acquired by Teva Pharmaceutical Industries in 2008 for an estimated $7.46 billion ($11.2 billion in 2025).

== History ==
Barr Laboratories Inc. was founded in New York in 1970 by Edwin A. Cohen.

Starting in 1991 Barr Laboratories was involved in a scandal stemming from their violation of GMP regulations concerning handling of out-of-specification (OOS) test results. In 1993 Barr Labs lost a lawsuit stemming from these findings, resulting in new industry interpretations of FDA regulations regarding out of specification test results.

In 1993, Bruce L. Downey joined the company as its president and in 1994, he became chairman and chief executive officer of the company. In 1993, the company settled a patent infringement case and began distributing a generic version of tamoxifen citrate, a treatment for breast cancer.

In 1995, the company received approval to manufacture and sell a generic version of zidovudine (AZT), a treatment for AIDS. In 1996, the company became the first to receive approval from the Food and Drug Administration to market generic Warfarin, which was previously only sold by DuPont.

In 2001, the company acquired Duramed Pharmaceuticals for $589 million in stock. In August 2001, after a 5-year legal battle with Eli Lilly and Company, the company began selling a generic version of Prozac.

In 2003, the company acquired Endeavor Pharmaceuticals for $35 million. In 2004, the company acquired Women's Capital, maker of Plan B emergency contraceptives.

In October 2006, the company acquired Pliva. On December 23, 2008, the company was acquired by Teva Pharmaceutical Industries and became part of Teva Active Pharmaceutical Ingredients (TAPI).
