= Agerafenib =

Chemical compound

Names
- IUPAC name 1-[3-(6,7-dimethoxyquinazolin-4-yl)oxyphenyl]-3-[5-(1,1,1-trifluoro-2-methylpropan-2-yl)-1,2-oxazol-3-yl]urea
- Other names: CEP-32496; AC013773; Rxdx 105

Identifiers
CAS Number	1188910-76-0
3D model (JSmol)	Interactive image
ChEMBL	ChEMBL2029988
ChemSpider	28506650
DrugBank	DB15068
IUPHAR/BPS	7880
PubChem CID	56846693
UNII	78I4VEX88N
CompTox Dashboard (EPA)	DTXSID601025976
- InChI: InChI=1S/C24H22F3N5O5/c1-23(2,24(25,26)27)19-11-20(32-37-19)31-22(33)30-13-6-5-7-14(8-13)36-21-15-9-17(34-3)18(35-4)10-16(15)28-12-29-21/h5-12H,1-4H3,(H2,30,31,32,33) Key: DKNUPRMJNUQNHR-UHFFFAOYSA-N
- SMILES: CC(C)(C1=CC(=NO1)NC(=O)NC2=CC(=CC=C2)OC3=NC=NC4=CC(=C(C=C43)OC)OC)C(F)(F)F

Properties
Chemical formula	C_{24}H_{22}F_{3}N_{5}O_{5}
Molar mass	517.465 g·mol^{−1}
Solubility	≥ 25.85 mg/mL in DMSO
- Except where otherwise noted, data are given for materials in their standard state (at 25 °C [77 °F], 100 kPa). Infobox references

Agerafenib is a selective multi-kinase inhibitor. It is undergoing a trial to test its ability to treat malignant tumors in humans. It is effective in doses ranging between 30 milligrams and 100 milligrams. It is also known as CEP-32496 and RXDX 105. It is a strong inhibitor of the BRAF gene, which is commonly found in cancerous cells.

== Discovery ==
Agerafenib was originally discovered by a company called Daiichi Sankyo (then called Ambit Biosciences) and Teva Pharmaceuticals (then called Cephalon) during a research program. The chemical was originally named "CEP-32496" before being renamed to "RXDX 105" in 2015. It is currently undergoing a clinical trial to test its effectiveness against cancer in humans.

== Characteristics ==
Agerafenib's chemical formula consists of 24 carbon atoms, 22 hydrogen atoms, 3 fluorine atoms, 5 nitrogen atoms and 5 oxygen atoms. The chemical's molar mass is 517.465 g/mol, and the monoisotopic mass is 517.157303 g/mol. It appears as a white to off-white crystalline powder in room temperature. Agerafenib has 5 hydrogen bond acceptors and 2 hydrogen bond donors. It has an partition coefficient of 4.35. It has 10 rotatable bonds and a topological polar surface area of 120.63.

The chemical is a strong inhibitor of the BRAF gene, which is present in around 7% of all malignant tumors. It does this due to its strong cytotoxicity to cells containing it. Agerafenib also inhibits phosphorylation in mitogen-activated protein kinase (an enzyme that causes certain cellular responses). The drug is shown to be most effective in humans in doses between 30 milligrams and 100 milligrams.
