= Theramex =

Pharmaceutical company based in London

- Company type: Private company
- Industry: Pharmaceuticals
- Founded: 1954; 71 years ago in Monaco
- Founder: Paul Hamel
- Headquarters: London, United Kingdom
- Key people: Robert Stewart( CEO)
- Website: theramex.com

Theramex is a British pharmaceutical company based in London which produces women's health products focusing on contraception, fertility, menopause and osteoporosis.

== History ==
The company was re-established in 2018 with the acquisition of some of the assets of Teva Active Pharmaceutical Ingredients relating to Theramex Laboratories, a pharmaceutical company which was based in Monaco. Brands include Ovaleap, Zoely, Seasonique, Actonel, Estreva and Lutenyl.

It made an agreement with TherapeuticsMD in 2019 for exclusive licensing and supply rights to Bijuva and Imvexxy outside of the USA, Canada and Israel for which it paid a license fee of $15.5 million.

In 2021, Theramex launched Livogiva, Lundeos (Osteoporosis) and Bijuva (Menopause). That same year Theramex entered Consumer Healthcare Market with Femarelle, a non-hormonal option to treat menopause symptoms.

=== Timeline ===
- 1954: Theramex is founded by Paul Hamel and based in Monaco.
- 1970: The Theramex brand is established as an independent Women’s Health company, mainly serving France and Italy.
- 1999: Merck acquires Theramex from François Rougaignon, Paul Hamel Nicolas Guérité and a financial holding company.
- 2000: Merck KGaA acquires Theramex. The company footprint grows to serve over 25 countries.
- 2011: Teva Pharmaceuticals acquires Theramex and introduces the Teva Women’s Health brand.
- 2012: Theramex enters the contraception market with the introduction of a new product. Over the next few years, Theramex develops its product range and expands its portfolio, serving women’s needs in over 50 markets.
- 2018: Teva Women’s Health is sold to CVC Capital Partners. In the latter part of 2018 there were problems with the production of its hormone replacement therapy products Evorel, FemSeven Conti and FemSeven Sequi. These Hormone replacement therapy patches were not available because of issues manufacturing the glue for the patches in China. The company recruited another manufacturer to assist with supply in December 2019. It was not expected that normal supplies would be available before June 2020.
- 2019: Theramex expands its reach into The Netherlands, Poland, Slovakia and Romania. In June, Theramex completed separation from Teva in all EU markets.
- 2020: Theramex opens another HQ in Warsaw, Poland. It also awards five grants to fund research into Assisted Reproductive Medicine.
