= Günther Friedländer =

German pharmacist, botanist, pharmacognosist, food chemist and industrialist

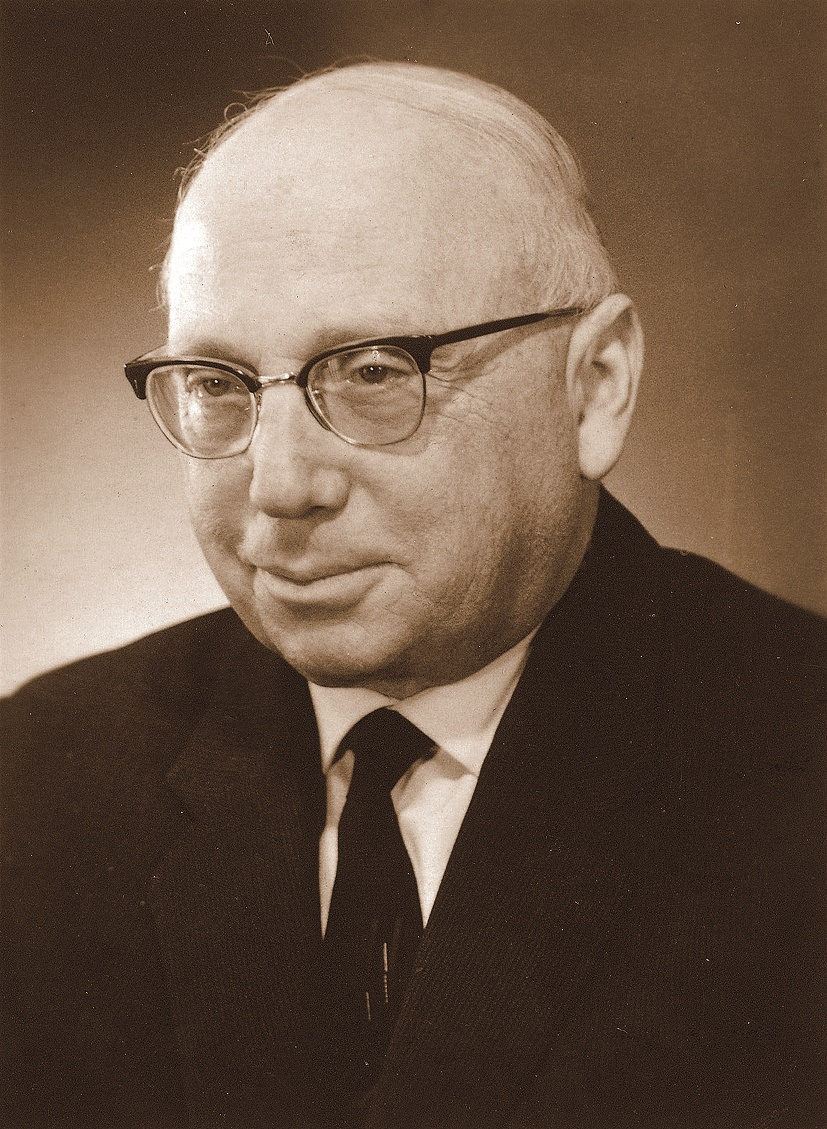
Dr. Günther Friedländer

Günther Friedländer (April 8, 1902 – May 25, 1975) was a German and Israeli pharmacist, botanist, pharmacognosist, food chemist, an industrialist of medical products, and the founder of Teva Pharmaceutical Industries.

== Biography ==
Günther Friedländer was born on April 8, 1902, in Königshütte (Chorzów), Upper Silesia, in Germany – a developing coal industry area. His parents were Paula Kober and Adolf Aron Friedlander, a merchant in the footwear industry. In 1912, the Friedländer family moved from Kőnigshütte, an area polluted with coal dust, west to Ratibor, where a small Jewish community lived. At age 11, Friedländer joined the Jewish movement "Blau-Weiss" (Blue-White) in Ratibor. In parallel to his life-science studies, Friedländer wrote stories and plays relevant to events occurring around him, to the meaning of life, and about his longing for the land of Israel and Jerusalem such as: "In our fathers land," "Poem to Jerusalem," "Persephone, the Goddess of Spring," and "Jacob the dreamer."

In 1920, Friedländer was accepted to Wilhelm Friedrich University, School of Pharmacy in Breslau, and became a member of the Zionist student movement: KJV (Kartell Jüdischer Verbindungen). Upon completing his exams and receiving the first science degree, Friedländer went to the University of Bern in Switzerland to do his doctorate studies with Alexander Tschirch. In July 1927, Friedländer completed his doctorate studies summa cum laude and received his doctorate of philosophy for his thesis on "Research in development processes within the field of Pharmacological, botanical and chemical pharmacology." After receiving his Ph.D., Friedländer returned to Breslau and worked as an assistant of Dr. A. Rop in the university faculty for Pharmacy and acted as the laboratory manager, where he taught the Pharmacy faculty students during their two last semesters in the university. At that time, Friedländer was working on analytical chemistry research under the supervision of Dr. A Rop. In November 1929, Friedlander received his pharmacist diploma signed by Dr. Shozol, the Prussian Minister for National Welfare.

In April 1930, Friedländer moved to Görlitz in order to manage the pharmacy and laboratory of his aunt Else Kober, named the "Crown Pharmacy in Görlitz – (1883), "Kronen-Apotheke – Görlitz". Else Kober was a First World War widow, and a bereaved mother to her only child. Her husband Max Kober, Friedländer's uncle and the brother of his mother Paula, was a pharmacist and the owner of the pharmacy in Görlitz. He was drafted to the army during the First World War and mortally wounded. On May 31, 1933, four months after the rise of the Nazis to power, and two months following the "humiliating trip" that was forced by the Nazis on the "white collar" professional Jews in Görliz, Friedländer sailed to Palestine to explore and search for the location to establish his pharmaceutical industry to be named Teva. During his journey in Palestine, he decided to build the company in Jerusalem, and he then returned to Germany. The "Blau-Weiss" movement of which Friedländer was a member in Ratibor, advocated going to nature, to know and to love nature's gift and its flora. Since the Balfour Declaration in 1917, the "Blue-White" movement adopted Zionism values and taught in its spirit. This was a "life changing" event in Friedländer's life at age of 15. He wrote stories, poems, and a play related to Erez Israel, and directed his life towards Erez Israel to produce there medicine from locally grown plants.

=== Friedländer's Zionist activity ===
As a student in Wilhelm Friedrich University, Friedländer belonged to and was active in the Zionist student movement. This movement directed its members to immigrate to Erez Israel in the future. As a pharmacist in Görlitz, he was an active member in the Zionist circle and gave lectures from time to time. Immediately after the Nazis came to power – and after the "humiliating trip" that he experienced in Görlitz – he decided that it was time to immigrate to Erez Israel. Once there he planned to establish a pharmaceutical industry specializing in the manufacture of medical products from local plants. On April 2, 1934, Friedländer immigrated to Israel with his first wife Charlotte, followed a month later by his aunt Else Kober on May 8, 1934.

=== Teva ===
"We aspire to assist human nature by means produced from Nature"; this sentence Friedländer wrote in the year 1923, at age of 21, while he "shaped his vision" during the annual conference of the "Blue-white" organization held in Hohenberg. At this meeting, movement committee delegates, including Friedländer, met with Dr. Chaim Weizmann that told them: "Industry is the basis and foundation for the development of a place. In Palestine there is no industry. You all should prepare for Palestine's needs, which requires specialists like you in applied industry. Go and establish industry there." The two cousins and committee delegates, Kurt Grunwald and Friedländer, decided at that time to fulfill Weizmann's order and reacted: "When time comes, we will immigrate to Palestine and build there an industry for medicines in the spirit of "Blue White" and we will name it Teva ("Teva" in Hebrew means "Nature"). Teva medical products will be manufactured from local natural materials/minerals and from the plants growing in Erez Israel".

At that time, the people who worked as pharmacists in "Erez Israel" had not completed their academic studies and had not received the diploma. In order to assist these workers to achieve the diploma, Friedländer prepared on May 5, 1934, a memorandum indicating cardinal points that are required for establishing a clinic and a university institute in Jerusalem that will create the basis for the school of pharmacy, a place where professional courses will be taught to pharmacy students that did not complete their formal studies. Their pharmacy will create the basis of the Hebrew Pharmacopeia.

On April 19, 1935, Friedländer wrote a memorandum to Professor Otto Warburg, one of the research pioneers of nature in Erez Israel and the manager of the Botanical Department in the Hebrew University. Friedländer indicated in his memorandum the need for establishing a school of pharmacy in Erez Israel in order to qualify pharmacists to become competent professional workers and provided a plan for Pharmacy school establishment that included various requirements such as: necessities, facilities, facility equipment, teachers and more. Warburg replied that the advocated plan is too expensive and there is no sufficient budget for such a plan and therefore the plan is not applicable.

=== Establishment of Teva Pharmaceutical Company in Jerusalem ===
The Teva company was founded by Friedländer and his aunt Else Kober on May 1, 1935. The company's registered name was "Teva Middle East Pharmaceutical & Chemical Works Co. Ltd. Jerusalem, Palestine." The company was built with an investment of 4,900 pound sterling, part came from private capital and partly from loans intended for German immigrants to establish industries. Credit shortage led to the joining of the banker Dr. Alfred Feuchtwanger as a partner in Teva with 33% of shares in the company. In 1951, Feuchtwanger initiated the entrance of Teva to the Tel-Aviv stock market as a registered public company. Friedländer used to say during difficult economic times, that a pharmaceutical industry has a strong basis in that: "A Jewish mother will always buy medicine for her children." In the Second World War, the company provided medicine to the allied forces and in particular to the British army present in the Middle East. Within the framework of contacts with the British Mandate regime, Sir Alan Gordon Cunningham, the British high commissioner of Palestine, on behalf of the colonial minister and responsible for the British Mandate, visited Teva. His visit glorified Teva's reputation among the "medicine market" and created a momentum for Teva development.

In 1959, the pharmaceutical section of the Israeli Manufacturer's Association performed a survey grading the pharmaceutical companies in Israel according to several measures. Teva Company from Jerusalem was graded in the first place. Survey results proved that the market likes Teva products, many of them were developed by Friedländer and his staff. Teva workers pride was raised, and they felt there is a reward for their initiative, ideas and strict performance and appreciation for company excellent man-power. During the Second World War and until the termination of the British mandate regime, Teva exported its medical products to Arabic countries. In 1941, Friedländer presented the Teva company products in an exhibition held in Cairo, Egypt. The exhibition was sponsored by the "General Agent and Sole Distribution of medicine in Egypt and Sudan, Syria, and Lebanon. Later on, the Teva company exported its products to the United States, Soviet Union (USSR), health institutes in Denmark, Czechoslovakia, Persia, and Burma. In 1954, Teva company received from the Israeli President Mr. Yitzhak Ben Zvi the certificate of "Company Excellence." Friedländer emphasized the importance of education and training of Teva personnel for the various operations as demanded by the pharmaceutical industry as well as on achieving broader knowledge and participation in various courses held outside the company. In 1964, contacts between the Teva company and other companies were developed. These included contacts with Laboratorios Syntex from Mexico, Schering-Plough Corporation, and others.

=== Pharmaceuticals produced by Friedländer and his staff ===
- Optalgin – A product for reducing fever and for pain relief. The product name "Optalgin" as given by Friedländer was derived from the two words: "Optimum" and "Analgesic."
- Bitupal – Compounds intended for treating various dermatological skin diseases that were administered as liquid, ointment and cream, such as Leuko-Bitupal- Cordelta (L.B.C) cream. Bitupal products were produced from bitumen (asphaltite) rocks that were removed from the Dead Sea. In 1959, the Bitupal product was approved by the Food and Drug Administration (FDA) for marketing in the United States. The name "Bitupal" was derived from the words "bitumen" and "Palestine." Since 1959, the bitumen was collected from the Dead Sea by the members of Kibbutz "Ein Gedi" and transported to Teva in Jerusalem.
- Anova – A product for combined therapy and Madinon-S for sequential therapy, two hormone products administered for the inhibition of ovulation and regulation of the menstrual cycle.
- Foliandrin – A glycoside extracted from the Nerium oleander plant and prepared as drops, tablets, and suppositories. Product indications: as a cardiac stimulant and diuretic in cases of heart failure, myocardial insufficiency, myocarditis, auricular flutter and fibrillation, edema due to impaired pectoris, and acute infectious myocarditis.
- Dystonal – A product for treating muscular tension.
- Penbritin – Antibiotic from the penicillin family intended for treating bacterial infections, administered as a capsule.

=== Research project collaborations ===
In 1966, research collaboration of different projects was started between Friedländer and Teva company staff and the Hebrew University and two hospitals. These involved the development of Phenyl-Ethylacetyl-salicylate and Erythromycin Embonate

=== Late years ===
In the mid-1960s, Else Kober sold her company "controlling holder shares" that represented 1/3 of Teva value to the "Bank of Industry Development." From now on, the partners in Teva were Friedländer, Feuchtwanger, and the "Bank of Industry Development." In the year 1967, Teva company, located in Bayit VeGan neighborhood of Jerusalem, manufactured 250 different products. Scope of manufacturing was 9 million Israeli pounds, scope of export was 1.75 million Israeli pounds, and the annual dividend payment to shareholders was 8%. Friedländer and Kober decided at that time to move the company to another suitable industrial area. The authorities gave Teva 4.25 acres at convenient payment terms in the area of Tamir mountain in Jerusalem in order to build the new company. In the Tel-Aviv stock market, representatives of Assia-Zori company constantly bought Teva shares and as a consequence, a change in the holder share controllers occurred. Dr. Feuchtwanger decided to exit from its partnership and sold his shares of control to Assia-Zori company. The Bank of Industrial Development decided to exit from its partnership and to sell their controlled shares in a bid. Friedländer's power at Teva became weaker. He wished to keep Teva, "the apple of his eye," under his ownership and approached the bid together with Dr. Reuben Hecht, but they lost. Assia-Zori company offered a higher price and won the bid. From then on, Assia-Zori company owned 66% of Teva shares.

When Friedländer heard the bid results, he had a stroke. In November 1968, he sold his shares to Assia-Zori company and retired. On May 25, 1975, Friedländer died and was buried in Jerusalem.

=== Public activities ===
Between 1930 and 1934, Friedländer was active in Zionist Circles in Görlitz. Since 1935, he was active in the organization of the German and Central Europe immigrants. Between 1950 and 1953, he was a member in the team establishing the School of Pharmacy in Jerusalem and for creating the school image. During the 1950s and 1960s, Friedländer acted as the representative of the pharmaceutical industry in the Israeli Manufacturer's Association.

== Personal life ==
In 1931, Friedländer married Charlotte Mühsam and had two children. After 24 years, Friedländer and Charlotte divorced. In May 1945, Friedländer married Johanna (Hansi) Singer from the Cohen family, a mother to her son from her first marriage. Together they had one daughter.

== Perpetuation ==
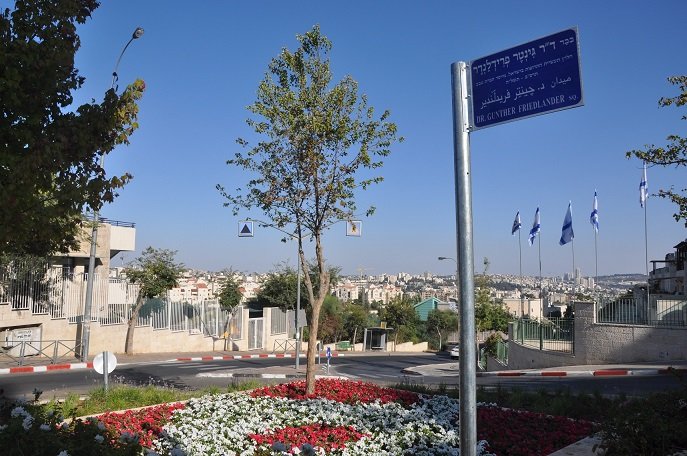
On September 14, 2016, a circle was inaugurated in the name of Friedländer.

Teva Pharmaceutical Industries concern limited grants every second year the "Teva founder's prize" to a scientist for excellency. Among them, an award in the name of Friedländer is given.

On September 14, 2016, a circle located at the intersection between the streets Haklai and Shachrai in Bayit VeGan was inaugurated in the name of Friedländer: "The founder of Teva, the pioneer of the pharmaceutical industry in Israel."
