= BcIII =

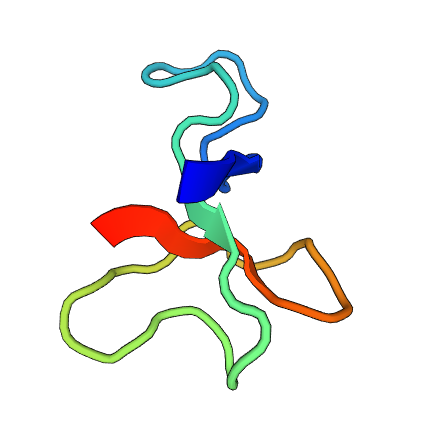
- Schematic diagram of the three-dimensional structure of BcIII

Identifiers
- Organism: Bunodosoma caissarum
- Symbol: N/A
- UniProt: Q7M425
Search for
- Structures: Swiss-model
- Domains: InterPro

BcIII is a polypeptide sea anemone neurotoxin isolated from Bunodosoma caissarum. It targets the site 3 of voltage-gated sodium channels, thus mainly prolonging the inactivation time course of the channel.

== Sources ==
BcIII can be isolated from the venom of the sea anemone Bunodosoma caissarum.

== Chemistry ==
BcIII belongs to Type 1 sea anemone neurotoxins, which target the α-subunits of voltage-gated sodium channels (Na_{v}1.x). It has 48 amino acids and a molecular mass of 4.976 kDa. The secondary structure of BcIII consists of 4.0% α-helixes, 43.4% β-strands, 21.3% β-turns and 31.3% is unordered. The three-dimensional structure of BcIII can be found on SWISS-MODEL.

G	V	A	C	R	C	D	S	D	G	P	T	S	R	G	N	T	L	T	G	T	L	W	L	T	-	G	G	C	P	S	G	W	H	N	C	R	G	S	G	P	F	I	G	Y	C	C	K	K

Figure 1: The amino acid sequence of BcIII.

== Target ==
BcIII binds to voltage-gated sodium channels on site 3, which is the extracellular loop connecting the segments S3 and S4 (the voltage sensor segment) of domain IV. BcIII has the biggest effect on Na_{v}1.1 and Na_{v}1.5 (Table 1). However, the affinity of BCIII to these sodium channels is relatively low in comparison with other toxins in the same family such as ATX-II and AFT-II.

Table 1: The affinity of BcIII to different sodium channels based on EC_{50} data.

Sodium Channels Subtypes	EC_{50} (nM)
Na_{v}1.1	Estimated 300
Na_{v}1.2	1449 ± 216
Na_{v}1.3	1458 ± 129
Na_{v}1.4	821 ± 144
Na_{v}1.5	307 ± 33
Na_{v}1.6	Estimated 900

== Mode of action ==
BcIII binds to site 3 of voltage-gated sodium channels during the closed state. Therefore, it prolongs the inactivation time course. The channel remains longer in the open state before inactivating, leading to an increase in the peak amplitude of the sodium current

Moreover, BcIII acts in a voltage-dependent manner. At saturating concentrations, the rate of unbinding from receptor sites is positively correlated to the amplitude and duration of the membrane depolarization. As a result, the destabilizing effect of BcIII on sodium channels is reversible.

BcIII shows no affinity to the open state of sodium channels and has no significant effect on activation kinetics.

== Toxicity ==
The LD_{50} of BcIII in mice is 600 μg/kg.
