= Kåre Schultz =

Danish business executive (born 1961)

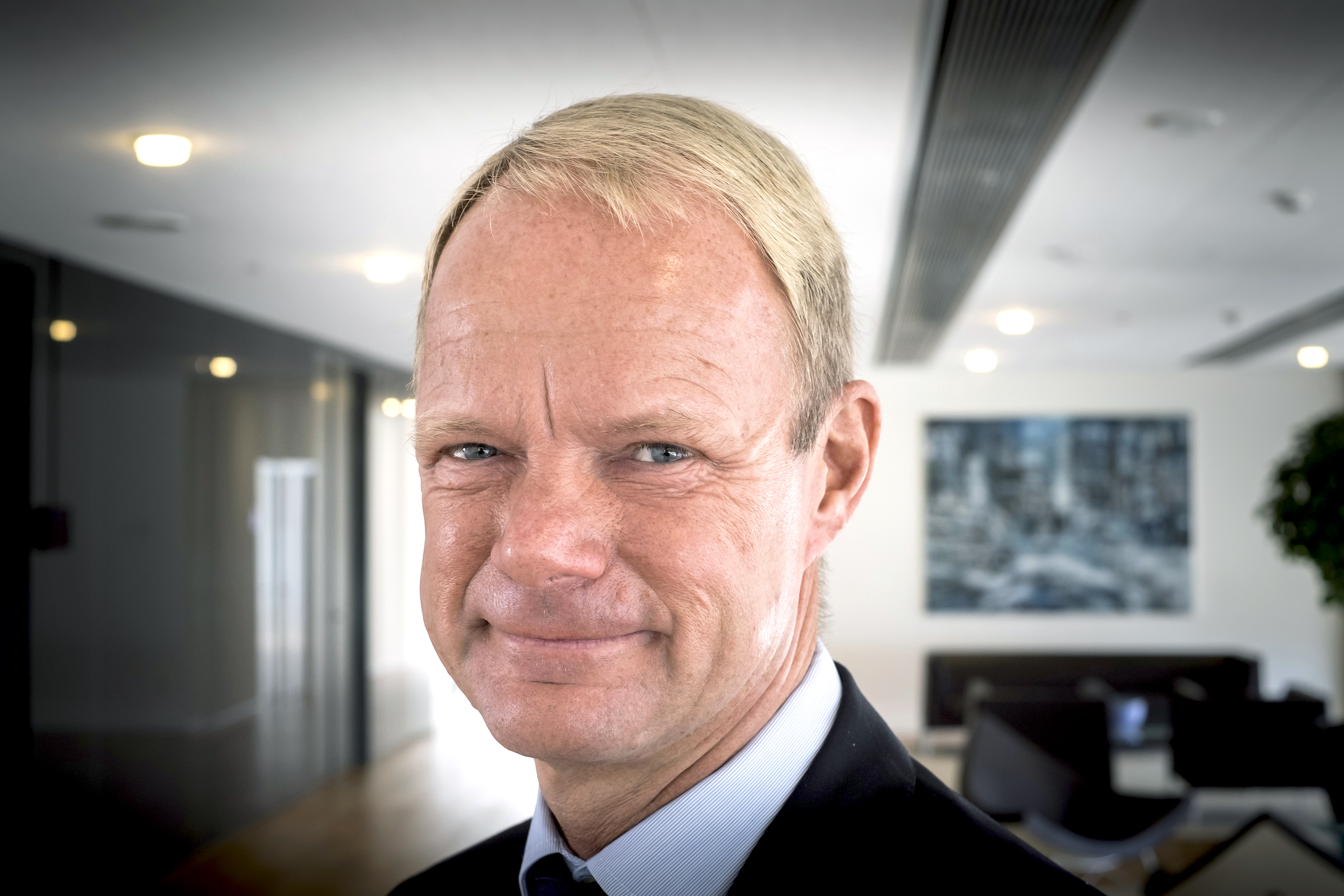
- Kåre Schultz in 2017
- Born: 21 May 1961 (age 65)
- Education: University of Copenhagen
- Occupation: Former CEO of Teva Pharmaceutical Industries
- Spouse: Marianne Schultz

Kåre Schultz (21 May 1961) is a Danish business executive. He was the chief executive officer of Teva Pharmaceutical Industries between September 2017 and December 2022.

== Career ==
Schultz has a Cand.polit. degree from the University of Copenhagen in 1987. He initially worked as a consultant for Andersen Consulting in London and for McKinsey & Company in Copenhagen.

He began to work for Novo Nordisk in 1989. He was appointed as executive vice president (staff and quality) in 2000, and became COO in 2002. In 2015, he was appointed as president and vice CEO.

In April 2015, Schultz left Novo Nordisk to assume a position as CEO of Lundbeck.

In September 2017, he was appointed as the new CEO of Teva Pharmaceutical Industries. He arrived at the top executive position around the time a US Court ruled that the patent of Copaxone, the company's best-selling drug, had expired, allowing the competition to market the same product. In November 2017, he announced deep structural changes aiming to make the company more responsive in a region-centric distribution system. Many executives left the company and 1,700 layoffs were announced in the press. In 2018, he was remunerated US$32.5 million, twice the amount of his 2017 remuneration.

In July 2019, he stopped production of Vincristine, a critical drug used to treat the most common forms of childhood cancer, and was criticized by media for creating a worldwide shortage of the drug.

He was the chairman of Royal Unibrew from 2010 until the end of December 2017. He has also been a member of Lego's board of directors since 2007.

== Personal life ==
Schultz is married to Marianne Schultz and has three children.
