= Teva Pharmaceuticals =

Israeli pharmaceutical company

Teva Pharmaceutical Industries Ltd.
- Type: Public
- Traded as: TASE: TEVA; NYSE: TEVA; TA-35 Index component
- Industry: Pharmaceutical
- Founded: 1935; 91 years ago
- Founders: Günther Friedländer; Chaim Salomon; Moshe Levin; Yitschak Elstein
- Headquarters: Tel Aviv, Israel
- Key people: Richard Francis (president and CEO); Sol Barer (chairman); Eli Kalif (CFO)
- Revenue: ▲US$16.54 billion (2024)
- Operating income: ▼US$−303 million (2024)
- Net income: ▼US$−1.64 billion (2024)
- Total assets: ▼US$39.26 billion (2024)
- Total equity: ▼US$5.373 billion (2024)
- Number of employees: 36,830 (2024)
- Website: tevapharm.com teva.co.il

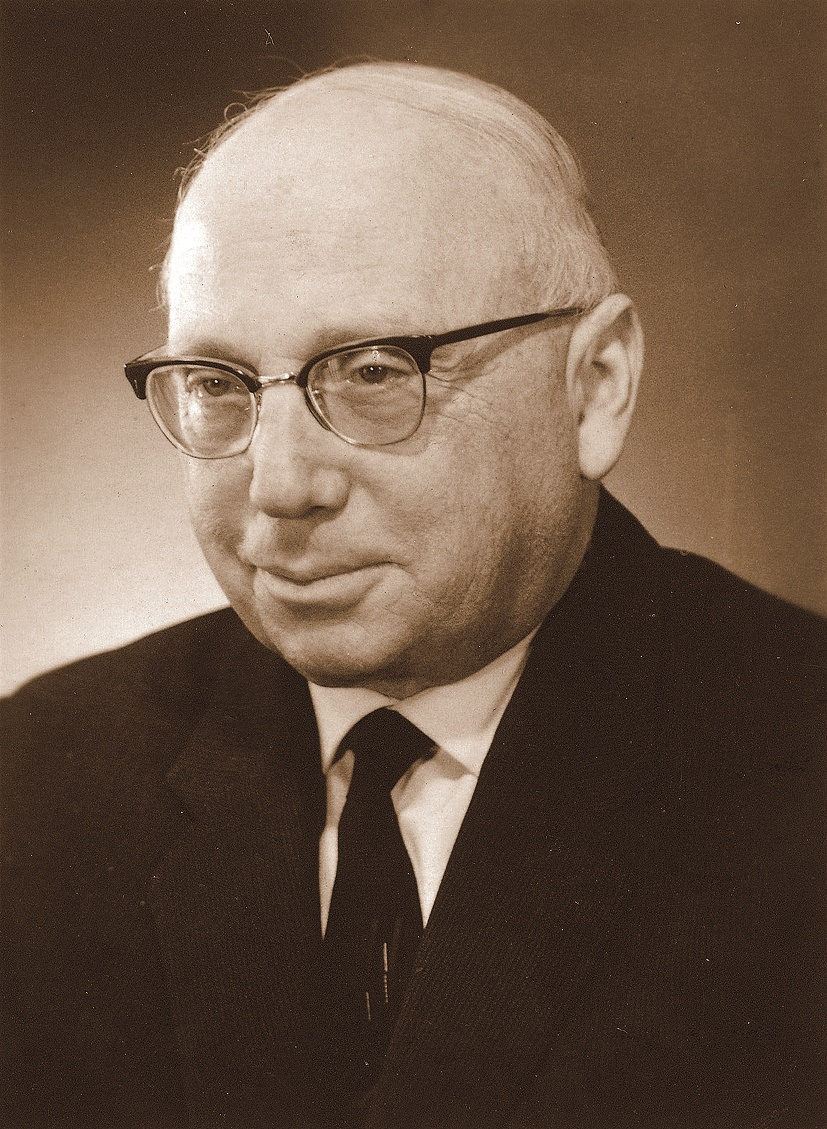
Günther Friedländer, founder of Teva Pharmaceutical Industries in Jerusalem

Teva Pharmaceutical Industries Ltd. (also known as Teva Pharmaceuticals) is an Israeli multinational pharmaceutical company. Teva specializes primarily in generic drugs, but other business interests include branded-drugs, active pharmaceutical ingredients (APIs) and, to a lesser extent, contract manufacturing services and an out-licensing platform.

Teva's primary branded products include Austedo (deutetrabenazine) which is used for the treatment of chorea associated with Huntington's disease and tardive dyskinesia; and Ajovy (fremanezumab), used for the preventive treatment of migraine in adults. Additional branded drugs sold by Teva include Copaxone, Bendeka and Treanda, all of which are primarily sold in the United States.

Teva is listed on the Tel Aviv Stock Exchange and the New York Stock Exchange. Its manufacturing facilities are located in Israel, North America, Europe, Australia, and South America. The company is a member of the Pharmaceutical Research and Manufacturers of America (PhRMA).

Teva Pharmaceuticals is the largest generic drug manufacturer in the world. Overall, Teva is the 26th largest pharmaceutical company in the world. Teva has a history of legal trouble in relation to collusion and price-fixing to inflate prices for drugs. In 2023, Teva paid the largest fine to date for a domestic antitrust cartel in relation to a criminal investigation by the US Department of Justice into the company's price-fixing.

== History ==
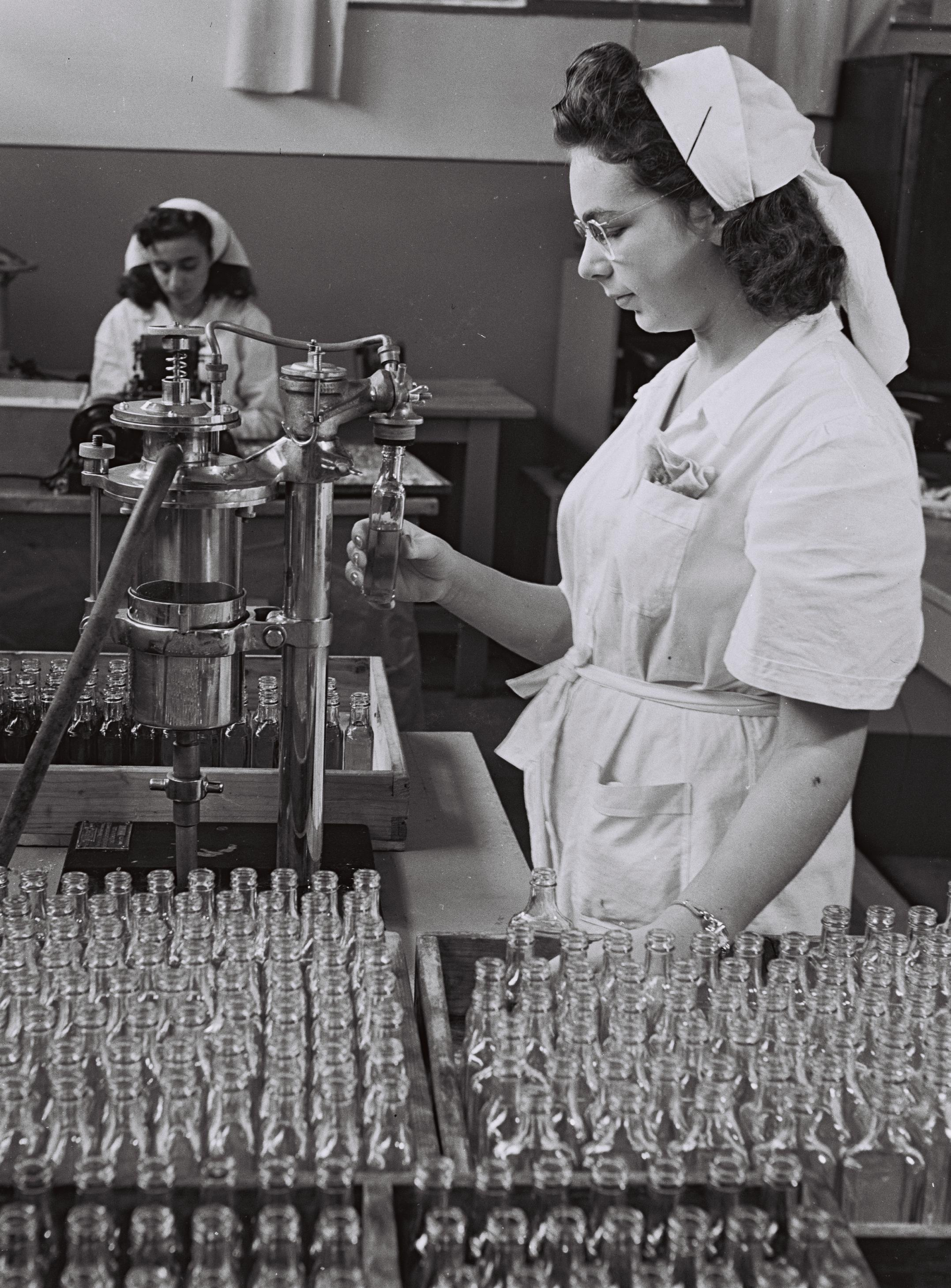
Workers at Assia plant in the 1930s

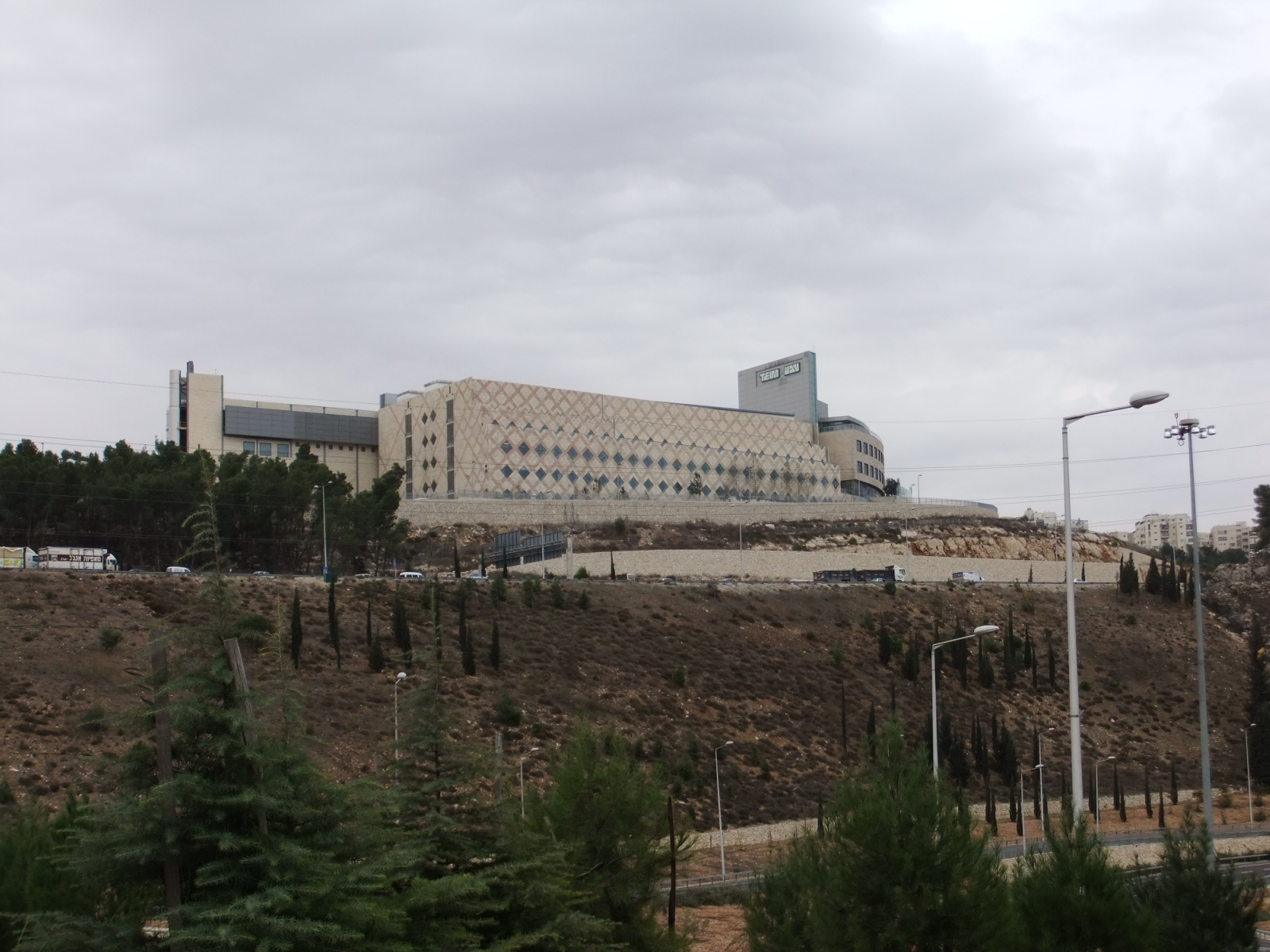
Teva plant, Har Hotzvim, Jerusalem

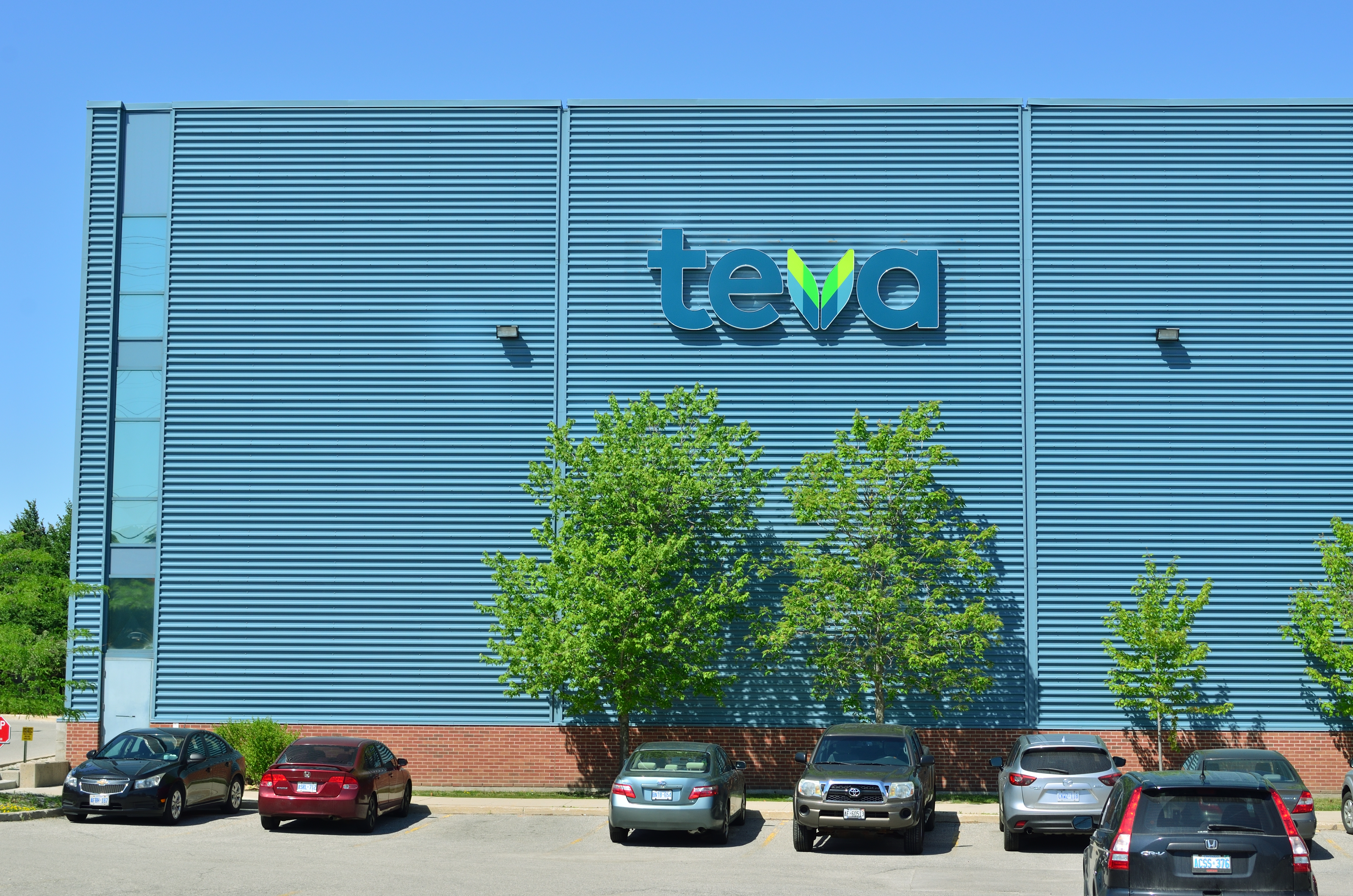
Teva in Markham, Ontario

=== Salomon, Levin, and Elstein ===
Teva's earliest predecessor was SLE, Ltd., a wholesale drug business founded in 1901 in Ottoman Empire's Mutasarrifate of Jerusalem. SLE Ltd. took its name from the initials of its three cofounders: Chaim Salomon, Moshe Levin and Yitschak Elstein, and used camels to make deliveries. During the 1930s, new immigrants from Europe founded several pharmaceutical companies including Teva and Zori. In the 1930s, Salomon, Levin, and Elstein Ltd. also founded Assia, a pharmaceutical company.

=== Teva Pharmaceutical Industries ===
==== 1935–1949 ====
Teva Pharmaceutical Industries took its present form through the efforts of Günther Friedländer and his aunt Else Kober on May 1, 1935. The original registration was under the name Teva Middle East Pharmaceutical & Chemical Works Co. Ltd. in Jerusalem, then part of Mandatory Palestine. Friedländer was a German pharmacist, botanist and pharmacognosist, who immigrated to Mandatory Palestine in 1934.

The company was built with an investment of £4,900, which came from the family's own capital and partly from loans from other German immigrants. Capital shortage led to the joining of the banker Alfred Feuchtwanger as a partner in Teva, who received 33% of the shares in return for his investment.

Friedländer's business philosophy opined that the pharmaceutical industry has a reliable basis in difficult economic times, since "A Jewish mother will always buy medicine for her children". In the Second World War, the company provided medicine to the allied forces and in particular to the British army present in the Middle East. After the war, Sir Alan Gordon Cunningham, the last of the High Commissioners for Palestine and Transjordan, visited Teva on behalf of the Secretary of State for the Colonies. His visit promoted Teva's reputation in the pharmaceutical market and created a momentum for Teva's development.

During Mandatory Palestine, Teva exported its medical products to Arab countries. In 1941, Friedländer presented Teva products in an exhibition held in Cairo, Egypt. The exhibition was sponsored by the General Agent and Sole Distribution of medicine in Egypt and Sudan, Syria and Lebanon. Later on, Teva exported its products to the US, Soviet Union (USSR), health institutes in Denmark, Czechoslovakia, Persia and Burma.

==== 1950–1999 ====
In 1951, Feuchtwanger initiated an initial public offering to raise capital through the newly founded Tel-Aviv Stock Exchange and Teva became a public company. In 1954, Teva received a Certificate Excellence in Training award from the Israeli President, Yitzhak Ben Zvi. In 1964, Teva partnered with Sintex, a company from Mexico, and Schering Plough.

In 1964, Assia and Zori merged and in 1968 acquired a controlling stake in Teva. In 1976, the three companies merged into the modern-day Teva Pharmaceutical Industries Ltd. In 1980, Teva acquired Ikapharm, then Israel's second largest drug manufacturer.

In 1980, Teva acquired Plantex.

In 1982, Teva was granted approval by the U.S. Food and Drug Administration (FDA) for its Kfar Saba manufacturing plant.

In 1995, Teva acquired Biogal Gyógyszergyár Rt. (Debrecen, Hungary) and acquired ICI (Italy).

==== 2000-2009 ====
In 2000, Teva acquired Canada-based Novopharm.

In October 2003, Teva announced its intentions to acquire Sicor Inc. for $3.4 billion. Following the announcement, the acquisition was completed on January 22, 2004, which marked Teva's entry into biosimilars' market.

In 2005, Teva opened a new, state-of-the-art pharmaceutical manufacturing plant in Har Hotzvim, a technology park in Jerusalem. The plant received FDA approval in early 2007. Teva entered the Japanese market in 2005 and in 2008 established a generics joint venture with Kowa.

In January 2006, Teva acquired its U.S. rival Ivax Corporation for $7.4 billion. In 2008, sales totalled $11.08 billion, $13.9 billion in 2009, and in 2010 total sales rose to $16.1 billion, of which a major portion was in Europe and North America. In July 2008, Teva announced it completed the acquisition of Bentley Pharmaceuticals for its generic pharmaceutical operations in Spain for $360 million in cash. On December 23, 2008, Teva acquired Barr Pharmaceuticals for $7.5 billion, making Barr and Pliva (which Barr bought earlier) part of Teva.

==== 2010-2019 ====
On March 18, 2010, Teva said it planned to acquire German generic Ratiopharm for US$5 billion. The deal was completed in August 2010, significantly expanding Teva's European coverage. In May 2011, Teva bought Cephalon for US$6.8 billion. The same month, Teva announced the ¥40 billion purchase of a majority stake in Japanese generic drug company Taiyo Pharmaceutical Industry, a move to secure a Japan-local production facility. Teva completed the $934 million acquisition in July 2011. In June 2013, Teva acquired US firm MicroDose Therapeutx for $40 million with as much as $125 million being paid in regulatory and developmental milestones In 2010, Teva announced that it would build its main distribution center for the Americas in Philadelphia, PA, and was considering opening its US headquarters in the area. In 2010, it had 39,660 employees. In Israel, the number of workers rose 7.5% by 6,774. In October 2010, Teva entered a licensing agreement with BioTime to develop and market BioTime's OpRegen for the treatment of age-related macular degeneration, an effort that in 2013 received $1.5 billion in funding from Israel's Office of the Chief Scientist.

In May 2011, Teva announced it would purchase Cephalon for US$6.8 billion.

In January 2014, Teva acquired NuPathe, after outbidding Endo, for $144 million. In June 2014, Teva acquired Labrys Biologics for up to $825 million, the aim being to strengthen the company's migraine pipeline through addition of LBR-101, an anti-CGRP monoclonal antibody therapeutic.

In March 2015, Teva acquired Auspex Pharmaceuticals for $3.5 billion growing its CNS portfolio. In April, Teva offered to acquire Mylan for $40 billion, only a fortnight after Mylan offered to buy Perrigo for $29 billion. Teva's offer for Mylan was contingent on Mylan abandoning its pursuit of Perrigo. Mylan stated in June 2015 that Teva's disclosure that it had a 1.35 percent stake in Mylan violated US antitrust rules. In October, the company acquired Mexico-based Representaciones e Investigaciones Medicas (Rimsa) for around $2.3 billion. In the same month Teva acquired Gecko Health Innovations. In November 2015, the company announced it would collaborate with Heptares Therapeutics with its work on small-molecule calcitonin gene-related peptide antagonists for migraine treatment, with the deal generating up to $410 million.

Teva Active Pharmaceutical Ingredients (TAPI) operates within Teva as a stand-alone business unit. In 2009, TAPI's sales to third parties totaled $565 million, and in 2010 sales rose by 13% to a total of $641 million.

In July 2017, it was reported that Pascal Soriot, CEO of AstraZeneca since 2012, would become the next CEO of Teva, succeeding Erez Vigodman, however this was soon refuted. As of August 2017, the company has struggled to attract a new CEO, leading to mounting questions for the board. In August 2017, the board of directors announced a 75% cut in the dividend, reflecting declining profitability, and the share price fell by almost half in the days following. As of September 11, 2017, Teva remained the "world's biggest seller of generics medicines". On September 11, 2017, it was reported that they had selected Kåre Schultz as the new Teva CEO. A day later the company announced it would sell its Paragard contraceptive brand to Cooper Cos for $1.1 billion, with the funds being used to pay down debt. Days later the company announced further divestments: a sale of contraception, fertility, menopause and osteoporosis products to CVC Capital Partners Fund VI for $703 million and its emergency contraception brands for $675 million to Foundation Consumer Healthcare. By December, the company had announced a drastic 25 percent workforce reduction (greater than 14,000 employees) as part of a two-year cost-reduction strategy. Following considerable lobbying by the Israeli Government, from whom Teva received considerable tax breaks, and from Israel's labor federation, the Histadrut, Teva agreed to delay some of the layoffs in Israel.

In October 2019, Teva faced criticism for making a "business decision to discontinue the drug" Vincristine, essential for the treatment of most childhood cancers according to the Food and Drug Administration.

===== Actavis Generics =====
In July 2015, Allergan agreed to sell its generic drug business (Actavis Generics) to Teva for $40.5 billion ($33.75 billion in cash and $6.75 billion worth of shares). As a result, Teva dropped its pursuit of Mylan. In order for the deal to gain regulatory approval, Teva sold off a number of assets, including a portfolio of five generic drugs to Sagent Pharmaceuticals for $40 million, as well as a further eight medicines to Dr. Reddy's in a $350 million deal. Teva also sold a further 15 marketed generics, as well as three others that were close to market, for $586 million to Impax Laboratories. In July, Teva sold off a further 42 products to Australian generics company, Mayne Pharma, for $652 million; the deal moved Mayne up 50 spots, into the top-25 companies of US generic companies. As part of the deal Teva will seek to raise $20 to $25 billion through a bond sale.

After completing the $39 billion acquisition of Actavis Generics, Teva announced another, smaller, deal with Allergan, agreeing to acquire its generic distribution business Anda for $500 million.

===== Divestments =====
On October 21, 2011, Par Pharmaceutical has sealed the deal to three products from Teva Pharmaceutical Industries, which the Israeli firm was required by the US Federal Trade Commission to divest before it could acquire US biotech Cephalon for $6.8 billion.

Following the acquisition of Allergan plc generic division some assets have been sold off to meet US antitrust requirements. In June 2016 Indian pharmaceutical company Dr. Reddy's Laboratories Ltd bought 8 (ANDA) Abbreviated New Drug Applications for $350 million in cash. Also in June 2016 Teva sold two ANDAs to Indian pharmaceutical company Zydus Cadilla, strengthening its US portfolio. On June 21, 2016, American pharmaceutical company Amneal Pharmaceutical previously known as Impax Laboratories bought a portfolio of generic drugs from Teva Pharmaceutical Industries for about $586 million. On July 29, Cipla an Indian pharmaceutical company bought three products from Teva. Indian pharmaceutical company, Aurobindo, was in the race to buy some Teva assets. In October 2016, Teva has sold off part of its UK and Ireland generic business to Indian pharmaceutical company Intas Pharma for 600 million pounds (5083 crore Indian rupees) in cash. In August 2016, Australia pharmaceutical company Mayne Pharmaceutical bought a portfolio of drugs from pharmaceutical giant Teva Pharmaceuticals last year for $845 million Australian dollars. In February 2018, Teva Pharmaceutical Industries Ltd has completed the sale of a portfolio of products within its global women's health business across contraception, fertility, menopause and osteoporosis for $703 million in cash to CVC Capital Partners Fund VI. Teva also agreed to sell its Plan B One-Step and its brands of emergency contraception to Foundation Consumer Healthcare for $675 million in cash. Combined annual net sales of these products were $140 million last year. It also sold Paragard to a unit of Cooper Companies Inc (COO.N) for $1.1 billion.

==== 2020s ====
In August 2025, Teva released the first generic version of a GLP-1 semaglutide product, named Saxenda. Saxenda is not a generic version of semaglutide (Ozempic) which is within patent protection. Saxenda is a generic of an older medication, liraglutide, that has been found to cause thyroid cancer in rats but with no evidence this risk extends to humans.

In the third quarter of 2026, Teva's revenues were $4.4 billion, exceeding predictions.

=== Acquisition history ===
The following is an illustration of the company's major mergers and acquisitions and historical predecessors (this is not a comprehensive list):

- Teva Pharmaceutical Industries
  - Gecko Health Innovations
    (Acq 2015)
  - - Rimsa
      (Acq 2015)
    - - Actavis Generics
        (Generic drug div Allergan, plc, Acq 2015)
      - - Auspex Pharmaceuticals
          (Acq 2014)
        - - Labrys Biologics
            (Acq 2014)
          - - NuPathe after
              (Acq 2014)
            - - MicroDose
                (Acq 2013)
              - - Taiyo Pharmaceutical Industry
                  (Acq 2011)
                - - Cephalon (Acq 2011)
                    - Arana Therapeutics
                      (Acq 2009)
                    - - ChemGenex Pharmaceuticals
                        (Acq 2011)
                  - - Ratiopharm
                      (Acq 2010)
                    - - Barr Pharmaceuticals
                        (Acq 2008)
                      - - IVAX Corporation
                          (Acq 2006)
                        - - Novopharm
                            (Acq 2000)
                          - - Plantex
                              (Acq 1980)
                            - - Ikapharm
                                (Acq 1980)
                              - - Salomon, Levin, and Elstein Ltd
                                  (Merged 1976 to form Teva Pharmaceutical Industries Ltd)
                                - Assia
                                  (Merged 1976 to form Teva Pharmaceutical Industries Ltd)
                                - Zori
                                  (Merged 1976 to form Teva Pharmaceutical Industries Ltd)
                                - - Glaxo
                                    (Acq 1914)
                                  - Margarine Unie
                                    (Acq 1924)
                                  - Allen & Hanburys
                                    (Merged 1976 to form Teva Pharmaceutical Industries Ltd)

== Corporate governance ==
Chief Executive Officer	Period of office	Notes
Eli Hurvitz	1976 to 2002	CEO & Chairman of the board until his death in 2011.
Israel Makov	2002 to 2007	
Shlomo Yanai	March 2007 to May 2012	Announced his resignation at the beginning of 2012.
Jeremy Levin	May 2012 to October 2013	
Eyal Desheh	October 2013 to January 2014	Interim CEO
Erez Vigodman	January 2014 to February 2017	Desheh returned to previous position of chief financial officer. Vigodman served as the CEO of Makhteshim Agan until joining Teva, and was president and CEO of Strauss Group prior to this. From 2014, Michael Hayden served as Teva's chief scientific officer and president of the company's global research and development.
Yitzhak Peterburg	February 2017 to Sept 2017	Peterburg held the position of chairman since 2015. He was appointed as interim president and CEO in 2017 succeeding Erez Vigodman. Since Israeli law does not permit the same individual to serve as CEO and chairman, Sol J Barer took over as the chairman of the board in February 2017.
Kåre Schultz	September 2017 – 2022	Schultz was appointed as the CEO and president succeeding the acting president and CEO Yitzhak Peterburg.
Richard Francis	January 2023 – present	

== Research and development ==
Teva holds patents on multiple drugs, including Copaxone, a specialty drug (for the treatment of multiple sclerosis), now the world's best selling MS drug, and Azilect (sold as Agilect in some countries) for treatment of Parkinson's disease. By July 2015, Copaxone held a "31.2 percent shares of total MS prescriptions in the United States". Teva's new 40 mg version of Copaxone taken three times a week "accounted for 68.5 percent of total Copaxone prescriptions in the United States". Copaxone accounts for about fifty percent of "Teva's profit and 20 percent of revenue". Competitors' Glatopa, 20 mg version of Copaxone, is taken once a day.

In June 2006, Teva received from the FDA a 180-day exclusivity period to sell simvastatin (Zocor) in the U.S. as a generic drug in all strengths except 80 mg. Teva presently competes with the maker of brand-name Zocor, Merck & Co.; Ranbaxy Laboratories, which has 180-day exclusivity for the 80 mg strength; and Dr. Reddy's Laboratories, whose authorized generic version (licensed by Merck) is exempt from exclusivity.

In June 2010, the company announced it would discontinue its production of propofol, a major sedative estimated to be used in 75% of all US anesthetic procedures.

In March 2015, Teva sold four anti-cancer compounds to Ignyta Inc. for $41.6 million. As part of the deal Teva sold the following compounds which were then renamed:

- CEP-32496 (renamed RXDX-105) a small molecule inhibitor of BRAF, EGFR and RET, now in Phase I/II trials
- CEP-40783 (renamed RXDX-106) a small molecule inhibitor of AXL and c-Met in preclinical development
- CEP-40125 (renamed RXDX-107) a nanoformulation of a modified bendamustine with potential activity in solid tumours. Bendamustine Rapid Infusion as therapy for CLL and NHL is part of Teva's specialty drugs pipeline.
- TEV-44229 (renamed RXDX-108) a potent inhibitor of the kinase PKCiota

In July 2019, the company stopped production of Vincristine, a critical drug used to treat the most common forms of childhood cancer, and was criticized by media for creating a worldwide shortage of the drug. On 28 January 2020, the company announced that the Food and Drug Administration (FDA) had approved an autoinjector device for Ajovy (fremanezumab-vfrm) injection.

== Controversies ==
=== Russia-Ukraine conflict ===
Following Russia's invasion of Ukraine in 2022, Teva Pharmaceuticals faced criticism for continuing its operations in Russia despite international sanctions. While the company committed to stopping new investments, its focus on ensuring an uninterrupted supply of medicines has raised ethical concerns, with critics arguing that Teva's presence weakens the impact of sanctions aimed at pressuring Russia economically.

=== Israeli-Palestine conflict ===
As an Israeli company, Teva faces boycotts from Palestine solidarity activists, such as Boycott, Divestment and Sanctions. According to the Who Profits Research Center, Teva "enjoys the advantages generated by the Israeli occupation of Palestinian lands allowing the company to exploit the Palestinian market", free from competition from most other pharmaceutical companies. In several instances there have been public calls to boycott Teva in this context. In 2023, several GPs in Ghent, Belgium, have called for the boycott. In September 2025, 104 staff members of the National Orthopaedic Hospital Cappagh, in Ireland, asked to “discontinue the procurement and use” of Teva products when other alternatives are available. In February 2026, the council of the Italian city of Monza has invited pharmacies to stop selling Teva products. Teva has tried to sue Olivia Zemor, a French activist calling for the boycott in 2016, claiming her statements were defamatory. Zemor was acquitted in 2021 and also in appeal in 2022.

In October 2026, the Royal College of Nursing (RCN), which represents more than 500,000 nurses in the UK, ended its commercial partnership with Teva UK and removed the company as sponsor of an RCNi nursing leadership summit on migraine and headache services scheduled for 30 October 2026. The RCN said further due diligence found that several Teva Pharmaceuticals operations had been subject to legal sanction and public scrutiny that were not in line with RCNi and RCN values. Teva said it was "disappointed" and that healthcare had been "politicised". The decision followed pressure from the campaign groups Nurses for Palestine and UK Healthcare Petitions to Royal Colleges. Pro-Palestine campaigners subsequently called on the Royal College of Pharmacy to drop Teva UK as a sponsor of its annual conference and cancel the company's exhibition stand.

== Legal issues ==
On June 25, 2010, Bayer sued Teva for falsely claiming that Teva's Gianvi was stabilized by betadex as a clathrate, and could consequently be advertised as a generic of Yaz. The settlement resulted in Teva changing its product marketing to remove the claim that it used the same ingredients as Yaz. Bayer's method specifically prevents oxidative degradation of the estrogen, while Teva's does not.

In January 2015, the Supreme Court of the United States decided for Teva on the Copaxone patent in Teva Pharmaceuticals USA, Inc. v. Sandoz, Inc.

In 2016, Teva agreed to pay $519 million to settle civil and criminal charges with the U.S. Securities and Exchange Commission and the U.S. Department of Justice involving bribery of government officials in Russia, Ukraine and Mexico.

In December 2016, the attorneys general of 20 states filed a civil complaint accusing Teva of a coordinated scheme to artificially maintain high prices for a generic antibiotic and diabetes drug. The complaint alleged price collusion schemes between six pharmaceutical firms including informal gatherings, telephone calls, and text messages.

In January 2019, the Supreme Court of the United States decided for Teva in Helsinn Healthcare S.A. v. Teva Pharmaceuticals USA Inc.

On May 11, 2019, Teva Pharmaceuticals USA was one of 19 drug companies sued for price fixing in the United States by 44 states for inflating its prices, sometimes up to 1000%, in an illegal agreement among it and its competitors. In June 2021, Teva agreed to pay $925M to settle allegations it had engaged in price fixing in Mississippi. In January 2022, Teva agreed to pay $425M to settle allegations that it had concealed price fixing practices from shareholders.

In May 2019, Teva Pharmaceuticals USA agreed to pay $85 million to the U.S. state of Oklahoma to settle allegations that it had been overprescribing opioids, marketing them as safe, and downplaying their addictive qualities.

In July 2019, Teva paid $69 million to settle pay-for-delay claims.

In January 2020, Teva Pharmaceuticals agreed to pay $54 million to settle allegations under the False Claims Act that it violated the Anti-Kickback Statute by funding improper speaking programs to boost prescriptions.

In 2021, New York Attorney General Letitia James filed a lawsuit against Teva and several other opioid manufacturers for their alleged contribution to the opioid epidemic in New York.

In February 2022, Teva agreed to a $225 million settlement with the state of Texas to end claims that it fueled an opioid epidemic in the state by improperly marketing pain medicine.

In August 2023, Teva admitted to price-fixing charges related to the generic cholesterol drug Pravastatin, and agreed to pay a $225 million fine, after a criminal investigation by the US Department of Justice. The US Department of Justice stated that the settlement was "the largest to date for a domestic antitrust cartel".

Also in August 2023, Teva agreed to a legal settlement with US hospitals over its marketing of opioid products that ultimately raised costs for health providers and contributed to the opioid epidemic in the United States. The lawsuit consisted of roughly 500 hospitals and health providers, resulting in a payment from Teva of $126 million over 18 years.

On October 31, 2024, the European Commission fined Teva €462.6 million "over misuse of the patent system and disparagement to delay [a] rival multiple sclerosis medicine", namely Copaxone (glatiramer acetate). Teva is accused of having attempted to obstacle other producers of glatiramer acetate both by abusing the patent system and by setting up a misinformation campaign targeting other glatiramer producers.

== Recalls ==
In 2018–2019, Teva Pharmaceuticals USA recalled antihypertensive tablets containing valsartan and losartan due to the detection beyond acceptable limit of N-nitrosodiethylamine (NDEA) and N-Nitroso-N-methyl-4-aminobutyric acid (NMBA), respectively, which are probable human carcinogens.

== See also ==
- BioTime
- Economy of Israel
- Health care in Israel
- Science and technology in Israel
- Teva Active Pharmaceutical Ingredients (TAPI)
- AION Labs
