= Teva Active Pharmaceutical Ingredients =

Israeli company

Teva api
- Company type: Division of Teva Pharmaceutical Industries
- Industry: Pharmaceutical
- Founded: 1935
- Headquarters: Petah Tikva, Israel
- Products: Pharmaceuticals
- Number of employees: 5,000 (2013)
- Website: www.teva-api.com

Teva API is an international pharmaceutical company headquartered in Israel. Teva API is a stand-alone business unit of Teva Pharmaceutical Industries limited, the largest generic drug manufacturer in the world and one of the 15 largest pharmaceutical companies worldwide.

On top of supplying a major share of Teva's own needs, the Teva API division is an active competitor in world markets, investing both in the development of new products, manufacturing processes and in the upgrading of production facilities. In 2014, Teva API's sales to third parties totaled $724 million. In recent years growth occurred in all of Teva API's principal geographical markets: North America, Europe and International.

== History ==
At the heart of the API division is the Israel-based Teva-Tech, formerly known as the Asia and Plantex plants which manufacture, develop and market raw materials for pharmaceuticals.

=== Acquisitions ===
Teva api has grown by acquiring manufacturing and development facilities around the world. Today, Teva api operates 21 plants and sales offices worldwide. Major Teva api's acquisitions:

- 2011 – Teva Acquisition of Theramex in Monaco
- Teva api 2008 Acquisitions
  - December 2008 – Teva Acquisition of Barr-Pliva in Croatia
  - July 2008 – Teva Acquisition of Bentley in Spain
  - April 2008 – Teva api Acquisition of Archimica in Puerto Rico
- Acquisitions & Foundations since the 1990s
  - 2006 – Acquisition of Wanma in China
  - 2006 – Acquisition of Ivax Corporation
  - 2004 – Acquisition of Sicor API in Italy, Mexico and Switzerland
  - 2003 – Acquisition of RDL in India
  - 2002 – Acquisition of PFC in Italy
  - 1996 – Acquisition of BIOCRAFT in Missouri (US)
  - 1995 – Foundation of TEVA-TECH in Israel
  - 1995 – Acquisition of ICI in Italy & BIOGAL in Hungary
  - 1991 – Acquisition of PROSINTEX in Italy

== Facilities ==
=== Research and development ===
The R&D group at teva api consists of a team of over 760 top scientists located in 7 development centers worldwide: A large center in Israel (synthetic products and peptides), a large center in Hungary (fermentation and semi-synthetic products), and a facility in India and additional sites in Italy, Croatia, Mexico and the Czech Republic (development of high potency API). teva api's R&D focuses on the development of processes for the manufacturing of API, including intermediates, chemical and biological (fermentation), which are of interest to the generic drug industry, as well as Teva's proprietary drugs. The API R&D division also seeks methods to continuously reduce API production costs, enabling teva api to improve its cost structure.

=== Manufacturing and technology ===
Teva has 15 API production facilities located in Israel, Hungary, Italy, the U.S., the Czech Republic, India, Mexico, Puerto Rico, Monaco, China and Croatia. TAPI's holds expertise in a variety of production technologies, including chemical synthesis, semi-synthetic fermentation, enzymatic synthesis, high potent manufacturing, plant extract technology, synthetic peptides, vitamin D derivatives and prostaglandins. Also, its advanced technology and expertise in the field of solid state particle technology enables it to meet specifications for particle size distribution (PSD), bulk density, specific surface area, polymorphism, as well as other characteristics.

Teva's API facilities meet all applicable current Good Manufacturing Practices (cGMP) requirements under U.S., European, Japanese, and other applicable quality standards. In some of the products that are sold in the U.S., TAPI utilizes controlled substances and therefore must meet the requirements of the Controlled Substances Act and the related regulations administered by the Drug Enforcement Administration.

== Products ==
Teva api produces approximately 400 active pharmaceutical ingredients covering a wide range of products, including respiratory, cardiovascular, anti-cholesterol, central nervous system, dermatological, hormones, anti-inflammatory, oncology, immunosuppressants and muscle relaxants. Its API intellectual property portfolio includes over 1,200 granted patents and pending applications worldwide.

== See also ==
- Teva Pharmaceutical Industries
- Active pharmaceutical ingredient
