= Pliva =

Croatian pharmaceutical company

Pliva d.o.o.
- Type: Subsidiary
- Industry: Pharmaceutical industry
- Founded: 1921; 105 years ago
- Headquarters: Zagreb, Croatia
- Key people: Mihael Furjan (CEO)
- Products: Generic drugs
- Revenue: $1.174 billion (2005)
- Net income: $0.336 billion (2005)
- Number of employees: 1,700
- Parent: Teva Pharmaceuticals
- Website: www.pliva.com

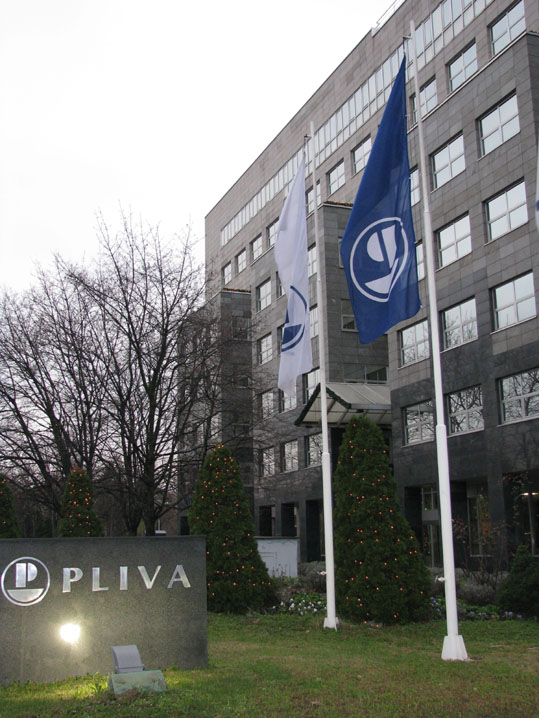
Pliva headquarters in Zagreb

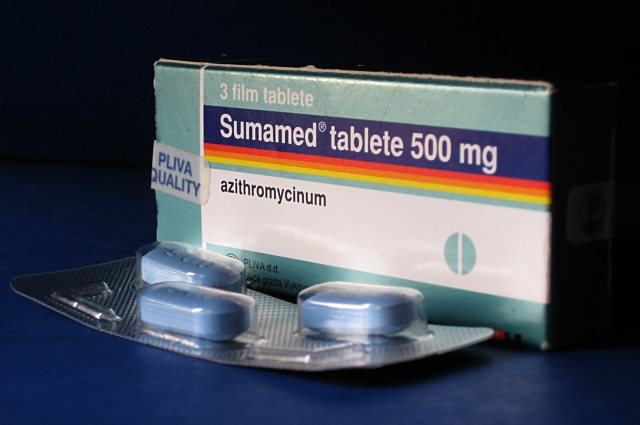
Azithromycin, also known as Sumamed, is one of the world's best-selling antibiotics.

Pliva d.o.o. is a pharmaceutical company based in Zagreb, Croatia that primarily manufactures and sells generic drugs. It is a subsidiary of Teva Pharmaceuticals.

Pliva is one of the world's largest producers of generic Adderall.

== History ==
In 1918 Gustav Janeček founded the wholesale drug company Isis (today Medika). In 1921 he co-founded the pharmaceutical factory Kaštel d.d. in Karlovac as a joint venture with Isis and Budapest-based Chinoin, and served as the company's first president of the board. The company kept its name after moving production to Zagreb in 1927. It was only in 1941 that it was renamed PLIVA as an acronym for the State Institute for Production of Medicines and Vaccines.

A team of Pliva's researchers, Gabrijela Kobrehel, Gorjana Radobolja-Lazarevski and Zrinka Tamburašev led by Dr. Slobodan Đokić, discovered azithromycin in 1980.

In June 2002, the company acquired Sidmak for $152.9 million.

Also in June 2002, Zeljko Peric, the chief financial officer of the company, resigned.

In May 2004, the company received approval from the Food and Drug Administration to sell trospium chloride.

In June 2005, the company received approval to sell a generic version of erythropoietin in Croatia.

In November 2005, the company received approval from the Food and Drug Administration to sell a generic version of Azithromycin, Citalopram, and Ondansetron.

In October 2006, Barr Pharmaceuticals acquired Pliva.

On December 23, 2008, Barr Pharmaceuticals was acquired by Teva Pharmaceuticals and the company became part of Teva Active Pharmaceutical Ingredients (TAPI).
