= Zrinka Tamburašev =

Croatian biochemist (1921–2003)

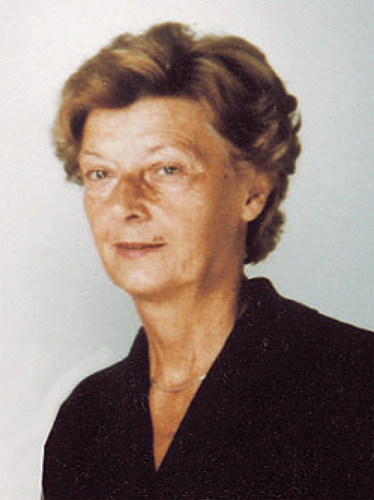
- Education: Chemical-Technological Department of the Technical Faculty in Zagreb
- Scientific career
- Thesis: Studije u redu eritromicina – sinteza eritromicin oksima, 9-amino eritromicina i njihovih derivata (1965)

Zrinka Tamburašev was a Croatian scientist known for her work in the development of antibiotics such as oxytetracycline and azithromycin.

== Early life ==
Tamburašev was born in Sisak, Kingdom of Yugoslavia, in 1921. She graduated in 1948 from the Chemical-Technological Department of the Technical Faculty in Zagreb and earned her doctorate in 1965.

== Career ==
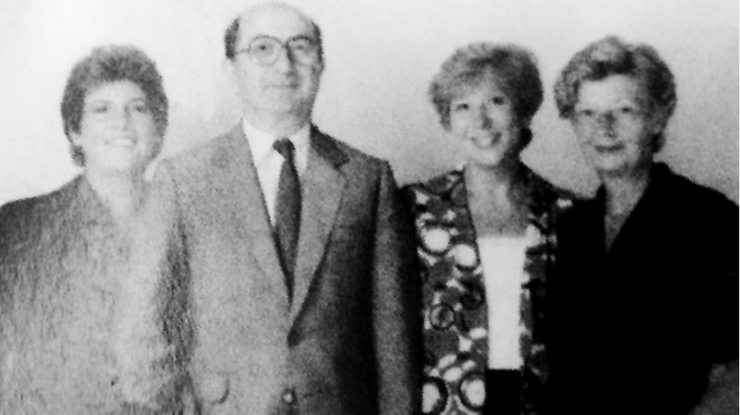
From left to right - Gabrijela Kobrehel, Slobodan Dokic, Gorjana Radobolja-Lazarevski and Zrinka Tamburasev

She joined the research institute of the pharmaceutical company PLIVA in 1957, where she made several discoveries and patents in departments of microbiology, biochemistry, and biotechnology. While at PLIVA she led the group for semisynthetic macrolides from 1972 to 1974, and in 1974 she was named the head of the natural products department.

In the mid-1960s, she worked with Slobodan Đokić on erythromycin A derivatives and on sulfonamide derivatives of erythromycylamine, with the idea of combining the properties of erythromycin and sulfonamides. She began work on the synthesis of individual phases for the preparation of azithromycin, and the results of this research challenged the previous understanding of the macrocyclic ring of erythromycin as the bearer of the antibacterial activity of macrolides. In 1974 her collaboration with Slobodan Đokić, Gabrijela Kobrehel, and Gorjana Lazarevski led to the development of azithromycin, an erythromycin derivative later established in the American market as Zithromax.

She devised a method for isolating the antibiotic oxytetracycline in its industrial production and dealt with the chemical transformations of tetracycline order antibiotics and erythromycin. She is a co-author of patents that protected the preparation of oximes of erythromycin A and erythromycylamine, important intermediates in the synthesis of second-generation macrolide antibiotics (azithromycin, clarithromycin, roxithromycin, and dirithromycin).

Tamburašev died on April 24, 2003, in Zagreb, Croatia, at the age of 82.

== Selected publications ==
- Djokić, Slobodan; Tamburašev, Zrinka (1967-01-01). "Erythromycin study: 9-Amino-3-0-cladinosyl-5-0-desosaminyl-6,11,12- tryhydroxy-2,4,6,8,10,12-hexamethylpentadecane-13-olide". Tetrahedron Letters. 8 (17): 1645–1647. doi:10.1016/S0040-4039(00)70331-5. ISSN 0040-4039. PMID 6047192.
- Djokić, Slobodan; Tamburašev, Zrinka (1967-01-01). "Erythromycin study: 9-Amino-3-0-cladinosyl-5-0-desosaminyl-6,11,12- tryhydroxy-2,4,6,8,10,12-hexamethylpentadecane-13-olide". Tetrahedron Letters. 8 (17): 1645–1647. doi:10.1016/S0040-4039(00)70331-5. ISSN 0040-4039. PMID 6047192.
- Kobrehel, Gabrijela; Tamburašev, Zrinka; Djokić, Slobodan (1977-03-21). "Erythromycin series: IV. Thin-layer chromatography of erythromycin, erythromycin oxime, erythromycylamine and their acyl derivatives". Journal of Chromatography A. 133 (2): 415–419. doi:10.1016/S0021-9673(00)83508-6. ISSN 0021-9673. PMID 838822.
- Lazarevski, Tomislav; Tamburas̈ev, Zrinka; Djokić, Slobodan (1977-02-11). "Erythromycin series: V. Quantitative analysis of cladinose and methylcladinoside by densitometry of thin-layer chromatograms". Journal of Chromatography A. 132 (2): 309–313. doi:10.1016/S0021-9673(00)89305-X. ISSN 0021-9673. PMID 833239.
- Djokić, Slobodan; Kobrehel, Gabrijela; Lazarevski, Gorjana; Lopotar, Nevenka; Tamburašev, Zrinka; Kamenar, Boris; Nagl, Ante; Vicković, Ivan (1986-01-01). "Erythromycin series. Part 11. Ring expansion of erythromycin A oxime by the Beckmann rearrangement". Journal of the Chemical Society, Perkin Transactions 1: 1881–1890. doi:10.1039/P19860001881. ISSN 1364-5463.

== Honors and awards ==
Following the discovery of azithromycin, she became the recipient of the City of Zagreb Award for 1959, the PLIVA Award for 1996, and the Croatian Chamber of Economy's Golden Marten Award for Lifetime Achievement for 1998. In 1998 she also received the Nagrade HAZU-a.

== Patents ==
Zrinka Tamburasev has filed for patents to protect the following inventions. This listing includes patent applications that are pending as well as patents that have already been granted by the United States Patent and Trademark Office (USPTO).

Patents by Zrinka Tamburašev
11-Aza-10-deoxo-10-dihydroerythromycin A and derivatives thereof as well as a process for their preparation	Patent number: 4328334 Abstract: 11-aza-10-deoxo-10-dihydroerythromycin A and derivatives thereof, and process for preparation thereof. Type: Grant Filed: March 28, 1980 Date of Patent: May 4, 1982 Assignee: PLIVA Pharmaceutical and Chemical Works Inventors: Gabrijela Kobrehel, Gordana Radobolja, Zrinka Tamburasev, Slobodan Djokic
4-Dedimethylamino-4-arylsulfonamido-5a,6-anhydrotetracyclines	Patent number: 4160783 Abstract: Novel 4-dedimethylamino-4-arylsulfonamido-5a,6-anhydrotetracyclines of the general formula I ##STR1## wherein R stands for C.sub.1 -C.sub.3 -alkyl, halogen or --NHCOR.sup.1, R.sup.1 being C.sub.1 -C.sub.3 -alkyl. Type: Grant Filed: November 28, 1977 Date of Patent: July 10, 1979 Assignee: PLIVA Pharmaceutical and Chemical Works Inventors: Marica Cakara, Slobodan Djokic, Zrinka Tamburasev
N-(Benzenesulfonyl)-erythromycylamine derivatives	Patent number: 3983103 Abstract: The new antibiotic compounds N-(4-R-benzenesulfonyl)-erythromycylamine, wherein R is a lower alkyl group having 1-5 carbon atoms, an acylamino group wherein the acyl has 2-4 carbon atoms, or a halo group. Type: Grant Filed: July 14, 1975 Date of Patent: September 28, 1976 Assignee: PLIVA Pharmaceutical and Chemical Works Inventors: Gabrijela Kobrehel, Zrinka Tamburasev, Slobodan Djokic
Manufacture of N-(benzenesulfonyl)-5-O-desosaminyl-erythromycilamine derivatives	Patent number: 3939144 Abstract: N-(4-R.sup.2 -benzenesulfonyl)-5-O-desosaminyl-erythromycilamine, wherein R.sup.2 is a C.sub.1 -C.sub.5 alkyl radical, halogen or NH.sub.2. The compounds possess antibacterial activity. Type: Grant Filed: January 10, 1975 Date of Patent: February 17, 1976 Assignee: Pliva, Pharmaceutical and Chemical Works Inventors: Gorjana Radobolja, Zrinka Tamburasev, Slobodan Djokic
