= LqhαIT =

Scorpion toxin

Identifiers
3D model (JSmol)	mature: Interactive image; immature: Interactive image
- InChI: mature: InChI=1S/C317H463N89O92S8/c1-25-155(15)252(401-291(475)205(120-172-78-92-181(416)93-79-172)370-259(443)160(20)354-279(463)215(130-246(435)436)384-270(454)191(60-43-105-339-315(332)333)365-305(489)248(329)151(7)8)307(491)355-163(23)257(441)360-188(57-36-40-102-320)267(451)379-211(126-235(326)421)288(472)373-203(118-170-74-88-179(414)89-75-170)284(468)380-212(127-236(327)422)289(473)397-226-147-505-501-143-222(295(479)368-196(313(497)498)62-45-107-341-317(336)337)391-266(450)187(56-35-39-101-319)357-240(426)138-348-302(486)228-63-46-109-405(228)311(495)250(153(11)12)399-274(458)192(61-44-106-340-316(334)335)366-308(492)253(156(16)26-2)402-304(488)230-65-48-110-406(230)312(496)251(154(13)14)400-292(476)213(128-237(328)423)381-290(474)216(131-247(437)438)385-303(487)229-64-47-108-404(229)310(494)217(112-150(5)6)387-260(444)161(21)351-275(459)200(116-168-70-84-177(412)85-71-168)374-298(482)224-145-504-506-148-227-301(485)403-254(164(24)409)309(493)367-189(58-37-41-103-321)268(452)378-208(123-232(323)418)263(447)345-134-238(424)349-158(18)256(440)388-219(140-408)293(477)389-218(139-407)264(448)347-137-241(427)358-199(115-167-68-82-176(411)83-69-167)281(465)393-221-142-500-502-144-223(392-273(457)195(96-99-244(431)432)362-283(467)204(119-171-76-90-180(415)91-77-171)386-306(490)249(152(9)10)398-300(226)484)297(481)375-202(113-165-49-28-27-29-50-165)282(466)361-190(59-42-104-338-314(330)331)269(453)383-214(129-245(433)434)278(462)353-159(19)258(442)369-201(117-169-72-86-178(413)87-73-169)285(469)394-225(299(483)382-210(125-234(325)420)287(471)363-194(95-98-243(429)430)272(456)371-197(111-149(3)4)280(464)396-227)146-503-499-141-220(296(480)377-207(286(470)395-224)122-174-133-343-185-54-33-31-52-183(174)185)390-261(445)162(22)352-277(461)209(124-233(324)419)359-242(428)136-346-262(446)198(114-166-66-80-175(410)81-67-166)372-265(449)186(55-34-38-100-318)356-239(425)135-344-255(439)157(17)350-276(460)206(121-173-132-342-184-53-32-30-51-182(173)184)376-271(455)193(364-294(221)478)94-97-231(322)417/h27-33,49-54,66-93,132-133,149-164,186-230,248-254,342-343,407-416H,25-26,34-48,55-65,94-131,134-148,318-321,329H2,1-24H3,(H2,322,417)(H2,323,418)(H2,324,419)(H2,325,420)(H2,326,421)(H2,327,422)(H2,328,423)(H,344,439)(H,345,447)(H,346,446)(H,347,448)(H,348,486)(H,349,424)(H,350,460)(H,351,459)(H,352,461)(H,353,462)(H,354,463)(H,355,491)(H,356,425)(H,357,426)(H,358,427)(H,359,428)(H,360,441)(H,361,466)(H,362,467)(H,363,471)(H,364,478)(H,365,489)(H,366,492)(H,367,493)(H,368,479)(H,369,442)(H,370,443)(H,371,456)(H,372,449)(H,373,472)(H,374,482)(H,375,481)(H,376,455)(H,377,480)(H,378,452)(H,379,451)(H,380,468)(H,381,474)(H,382,483)(H,383,453)(H,384,454)(H,385,487)(H,386,490)(H,387,444)(H,388,440)(H,389,477)(H,390,445)(H,391,450)(H,392,457)(H,393,465)(H,394,469)(H,395,470)(H,396,464)(H,397,473)(H,398,484)(H,399,458)(H,400,476)(H,401,475)(H,402,488)(H,403,485)(H,429,430)(H,431,432)(H,433,434)(H,435,436)(H,437,438)(H,497,498)(H4,330,331,338)(H4,332,333,339)(H4,334,335,340)(H4,336,337,341)/t155-,156-,157-,158-,159-,160-,161-,162-,163-,164+,186-,187-,188-,189-,190-,191-,192-,193-,194-,195-,196-,197-,198-,199-,200-,201-,202-,203-,204-,205-,206-,207-,208-,209-,210-,211-,212-,213-,214-,215-,216-,217-,218-,219-,220-,221-,222-,223-,224-,225-,226-,227-,228-,229-,230-,248-,249-,250-,251-,252-,253-,254-/m0/s1 Key: PSRMLGVGJNPSMR-UVACDHBQSA-N
- SMILES: mature: N[C@@]([H])(C(C)C)C(=O)N[C@@]([H])(CCCNC(=N)N)C(=O)N[C@@]([H])(CC(=O)O)C(=O)N[C@@]([H])(C)C(=O)N[C@@]([H])(Cc1ccc(O)cc1)C(=O)N[C@@]([H])([C@]([H])(CC)C)C(=O)N[C@@]([H])(C)C(=O)N[C@@]([H])(CCCCN)C(=O)N[C@@]([H])(CC(=O)N)C(=O)N[C@@]([H])(Cc1ccc(O)cc1)C(=O)N[C@@]([H])(CC(=O)N)C(=O)N[C@@]([H])(CS3)C(=O)N[C@@]([H])(C(C)C)C(=O)N[C@@]([H])(Cc1ccc(O)cc1)C(=O)N[C@@]([H])(CCC(=O)O)C(=O)N[C@@]([H])(CS4)C(=O)N[C@@]([H])(Cc1ccccc1)C(=O)N[C@@]([H])(CCCNC(=N)N)C(=O)N[C@@]([H])(CC(=O)O)C(=O)N[C@@]([H])(C)C(=O)N[C@@]([H])(Cc1ccc(O)cc1)C(=O)N[C@@]([H])(CS5)C(=O)N[C@@]([H])(CC(=O)N)C(=O)N[C@@]([H])(CCC(=O)O)C(=O)N[C@@]([H])(CC(C)C)C(=O)N[C@@]([H])(CS6)C(=O)N[C@@]([H])([C@]([H])(O)C)C(=O)N[C@@]([H])(CCCCN)C(=O)N[C@@]([H])(CC(=O)N)C(=O)NCC(=O)N[C@@]([H])(C)C(=O)N[C@@]([H])(CO)C(=O)N[C@@]([H])(CO)C(=O)NCC(=O)N[C@@]([H])(Cc1ccc(O)cc1)C(=O)N[C@@]([H])(CS4)C(=O)N[C@@]([H])(CCC(=O)N)C(=O)N[C@@]([H])(CC(=CN2)C1=C2C=CC=C1)C(=O)N[C@@]([H])(C)C(=O)NCC(=O)N[C@@]([H])(CCCCN)C(=O)N[C@@]([H])(Cc1ccc(O)cc1)C(=O)NCC(=O)N[C@@]([H])(CC(=O)N)C(=O)N[C@@]([H])(C)C(=O)N[C@@]([H])(CS5)C(=O)N[C@@]([H])(CC(=CN2)C1=C2C=CC=C1)C(=O)N[C@@]([H])(CS6)C(=O)N[C@@]([H])(Cc1ccc(O)cc1)C(=O)N[C@@]([H])(C)C(=O)N[C@@]([H])(CC(C)C)C(=O)N1[C@@]([H])(CCC1)C(=O)N[C@@]([H])(CC(=O)O)C(=O)N[C@@]([H])(CC(=O)N)C(=O)N[C@@]([H])(C(C)C)C(=O)N1[C@@]([H])(CCC1)C(=O)N[C@@]([H])([C@]([H])(CC)C)C(=O)N[C@@]([H])(CCCNC(=N)N)C(=O)N[C@@]([H])(C(C)C)C(=O)N1[C@@]([H])(CCC1)C(=O)NCC(=O)N[C@@]([H])(CCCCN)C(=O)N[C@@]([H])(CS3)C(=O)N[C@@]([H])(CCCNC(=N)N)C(=O)O; immature: N[C@@]([H])(CCC(=O)O)C(=O)N[C@@]([H])(CC(C)C)C(=O)N[C@@]([H])(CS)C(=O)N[C@@]([H])([C@]([H])(O)C)C(=O)N[C@@]([H])(CCCCN)C(=O)N[C@@]([H])(CC(=O)N)C(=O)NCC(=O)N[C@@]([H])(C)C(=O)N[C@@]([H])(CO)C(=O)N[C@@]([H])(CO)C(=O)NCC(=O)N[C@@]([H])(Cc1ccc(O)cc1)C(=O)N[C@@]([H])(CS)C(=O)N[C@@]([H])(CCC(=O)N)C(=O)N[C@@]([H])(CC(=CN2)C1=C2C=CC=C1)C(=O)N[C@@]([H])(C)C(=O)NCC(=O)N[C@@]([H])(CCCCN)C(=O)N[C@@]([H])(Cc1ccc(O)cc1)C(=O)NCC(=O)N[C@@]([H])(CC(=O)N)C(=O)N[C@@]([H])(C)C(=O)N[C@@]([H])(CS)C(=O)N[C@@]([H])(CC(=CN2)C1=C2C=CC=C1)C(=O)N[C@@]([H])(CS)C(=O)N[C@@]([H])(Cc1ccc(O)cc1)C(=O)N[C@@]([H])(C)C(=O)N[C@@]([H])(CC(C)C)C(=O)N1[C@@]([H])(CCC1)C(=O)N[C@@]([H])(CC(=O)O)C(=O)N[C@@]([H])(CC(=O)N)C(=O)N[C@@]([H])(C(C)C)C(=O)N1[C@@]([H])(CCC1)C(=O)N[C@@]([H])([C@]([H])(CC)C)C(=O)N[C@@]([H])(CCCNC(=N)N)C(=O)N[C@@]([H])(C(C)C)C(=O)N1[C@@]([H])(CCC1)C(=O)NCC(=O)N[C@@]([H])(CCCCN)C(=O)N[C@@]([H])(CS)C(=O)N[C@@]([H])(CC1=CN=C-N1)C(=O)N[C@@]([H])(CCCNC(=N)N)C(=O)N[C@@]([H])(CCCCN)C(=O)O
- Except where otherwise noted, data are given for materials in their standard state (at 25 °C [77 °F], 100 kPa). Infobox references

Alpha-Insect Toxin LqhαIT is a neurotoxic protein found in the venom of the Leiurus hebraeus, commonly known as the Hebrew deathstalker scorpion. It is classified as an alpha-toxin due to its effect on insect voltage-gated sodium channels, causing prolonged neuronal firing that leads to paralysis in affected insects. This toxin has been widely studied for its unique interaction with insect nervous systems and has potential applications in neurophysiological research.

Alpha-Insect Toxin LqhαIT

Identifiers
- Organism: Leiurus hebraeus
- Symbol: LqhαIT
- PDB: 8VQC
- UniProt: P17728
Search for
- Structures: Swiss-model
- Domains: InterPro

== Structure ==
LqhαIT is part of the larger family of scorpion alpha-toxins. that act specifically on insect sodium channels. The primary structure of LqhαIT consists of a polypeptide chain with several disulfide bridges, contributing to its stability and resistance to degradation. These disulfide bonds are essential for maintaining the conformation needed to bind effectively to target sodium channels in insect nerve cells.

LqhαIT binds to voltage-gated sodium channels in insect neurons, causing a prolonged opening of the channels. This action prevents the neurons from returning to their resting state, leading to continuous firing and eventually paralysis. This mechanism is specific to insect sodium channels, which makes LqhαIT highly selective, with limited effects on mammalian sodium channels.

As one of the most potent scorpion α-neurotoxins targeting insects, LqhαIT serves as a crucial model for understanding the structural basis of selective toxicity and biological activity among α-neurotoxins. Its structure was determined through proton two-dimensional nuclear magnetic resonance spectroscopy (2D NMR), revealing detailed conformational features and providing insights into the interactions that underlie its insecticidal potency.

=== Apo Structure ===
The solution structure of LqhαIT was determined using 2D NMR. The structural features include:

- Secondary Structure: LqhαIT consists of an α-helix and a three-strand antiparallel β-sheet. These elements are stabilized by three type I tight turns and a five-residue turn.
- Hydrophobic Patch: A distinct hydrophobic patch, characteristic of scorpion neurotoxins, includes tyrosine and tryptophan residues arranged in a "herringbone" pattern. This region likely contributes to toxin stability and interaction with insect sodium channels.

=== Comparison with α-toxin (AaHII) ===
The polypeptide backbone of LqhαIT closely resembles that of AaHII, an antimammalian α-toxin from Androctonus australis Hector, sharing approximately 60% amino acid sequence similarity. However, critical structural differences exist between the two, particularly in the five-residue turn involving Lys8-Cys12, the C-terminal segment, and the relative orientation of these regions. These variations are thought to underpin LqhαIT's selectivity for insect sodium channels, whereas AaHII is more effective against mammalian targets

=== LqhαIT bound to NavPas ===
Scorpion α-toxin LqhαIT exerts its potent insecticidal effects by specifically binding to a unique glycan on the insect voltage-gated sodium (Nav) channel. Cryo-electron microscopy (cryo-EM) studies have elucidated the structure of LqhαIT in complex with the insect Nav channel, revealing the intricate interactions between the toxin and the glycan scaffold attached to asparagine 330 on the channel. This glycan provides a distinct epitope that facilitates selective binding of LqhαIT to insect channels, stabilizing the voltage sensor domain in an inactive "S4 down" conformation. This mechanism contrasts with similar toxins that target mammalian channels, highlighting LqhαIT's specificity and effectiveness due to its selectivity.

Further studies demonstrated that LqhαIT contains an NC-domain epitope, including residues critical for binding to the glycan scaffold, enabling the toxin to maintain a stable interaction with the Nav channel. Molecular dynamics simulations confirm the stability of these interactions, including hydrogen bonds and salt bridges, which remain consistent throughout the simulations. This glycosylation binding contributes to the potency of LqhαIT and offers insights into the design of insect-specific Nav channel modulators. The structure-function relationship observed here underscores the utility of such toxins as models for developing targeted Nav channel modulators with minimal off-target effects on mammalian systems.

== Function ==
The primary function of LqhαIT is to immobilize prey, particularly insects, by inducing rapid neurotoxic effects. Upon envenomation, LqhαIT binds to the insect's sodium channels, leading to hyperexcitation and paralysis. This allows the scorpion to subdue its prey quickly and effectively. The specificity of LqhαIT for insect sodium channels also plays a role in the evolutionary adaptation of Leiurus hebraeus, helping it to target insect prey within its native desert ecosystem.

== Applications ==
Neurophysiological Research: LqhαIT's specificity for insect sodium channels has made it a valuable tool in neurophysiological research. Scientists use this toxin to study the role of sodium channels in neuronal function and to better understand the differences between insect and mammalian ion channel structures. LqhαIT also serves as a model for studying the structure-function relationship of neurotoxins, as it exhibits highly selective binding characteristics that are important for developing novel bioinsecticides.

== Toxicology ==
While LqhαIT is toxic to insects, it exhibits minimal toxicity to mammals, including humans. This specificity is due to structural differences in mammalian sodium channels, which do not interact with LqhαIT in the same way as insect channels. However, the venom of Leiurus hebraeus as a whole can still pose significant risks to humans, as it contains other potent toxins targeting various components of the nervous system. Proper safety measures are necessary when handling scorpion venom in laboratory settings to prevent accidental envenomation.

== See also ==
- Leiurus hebraeus
- Scorpion venom
- Voltage-gated sodium channels
