= ATX-II =

Sea anemone toxin

Chemical properties of ATX-II
- Molecular formula: C_{213} H_{329} N_{63} O_{61} S_{6}
- Number of atoms: 672
- Molecular mass: 4940.70 Da
- pI: 8.34
- Amino acid sequence: GVPCLCDSDGPSVRGNTLSGIIWLAGCPSGWHNCKKHGPTIGWCCKQ
- Modifications: Disulfide bonds: 4:44, 6-34, 27-45

ATX-II, also known as neurotoxin 2, Av2, Anemonia viridis toxin 2 or δ-AITX-Avd1c, is a neurotoxin derived from the venom of the sea anemone Anemonia sulcata. ATX-II slows down the inactivation of different voltage-gated sodium channels, including Na_{v}1.1 and Na_{v}1.2, thus prolonging action potentials.

== Sources ==
ATX-II is the main component of the venom of Mediterranean snakelocks sea anemone, Anemonia sulcata. ATX-II is produced by the nematocysts in the sea anemone's tentacles and the anemone uses this venom to paralyze its prey.

== Etymology ==
"ATX-II" is an acronym for "anemone toxin".

== Chemistry ==
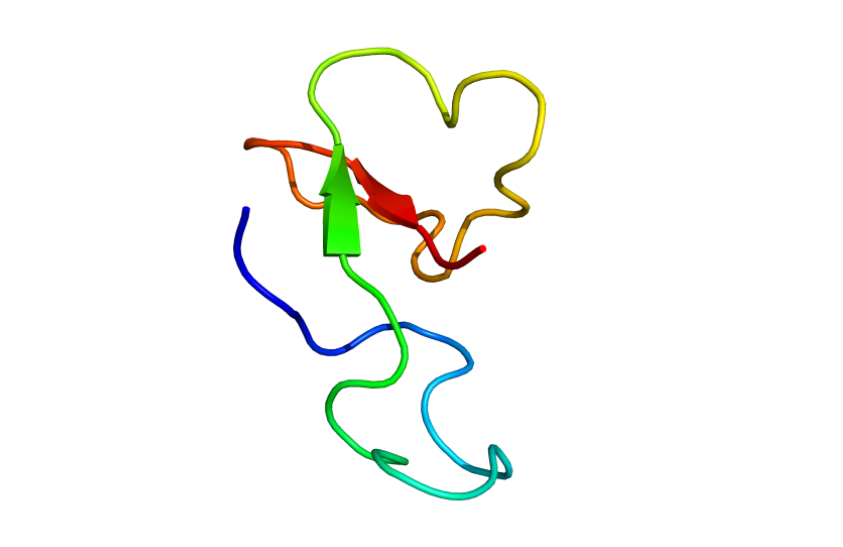
ATX-II 3D structure prediction model Confidence in the model: 47 residues (100%) modelled at >90% accuracy. Created by Phyre V 2.0

=== Structure ===
ATX-II is a protein comprising 47 amino acids crosslinked by three disulfide bridges. The molecular mass of the protein is 4,94 kDa (calculated with ProtParam ExPASy).

=== Family and homology ===
ATX-II belongs to the sea anemone neurotoxin family. Purification studies of ATX-II and the two other sea anemone neurotoxins, I and III, have revealed the polypeptide nature of these toxins. Toxins I and II are very potent paralyzing toxins that act on crustaceans, fish and mammals and have cardiotoxic and neurotoxic effects. Toxin III has been shown to cause muscular contraction with subsequent paralysis in the crab Carcinus maenas. All three toxins are highly homologous and block neuromuscular transmission in crabs.

Four other sea anemone toxins purified from Condylactis aurantiaca show close sequence similarities with toxins I, II and III of Anemonia sulcata. The effect of these different toxins on Carcinus meanas is visually indistinguishable, namely cramp followed by paralysis and death. However, their mode of action differs. Toxin IV of Condylactis aurantiaca causes a repetitive firing of the excitatory axon for several minutes resulting in muscle contraction without causing a detectable change in the amplitude of the excitatory junction potentials (EJPS). In contrast, the application of Toxin II from Anemonia sulcata results in the increase of the EJPS up to 40 mV causing large action potentials at the muscle fibers. Other toxins with a similar mode of action to ATX-II are α-scorpion toxins. Although both sea anemone and α-scorpion toxins bind to common overlapping elements on the extracellular surface of sodium channels, they belong to distinct families and share no sequence homology. The toxins AFT-II (from Anthopleura fuscoviridis) and ATX-II differ by only one amino acid, L36A, and the protein sequence of BcIII (from Bunodosoma caissarum) is 70% similar to ATX-II.

== Target ==
ATX-II is highly potent at voltage-gated sodium channels subtype 1.1 and 1.2 (Na_{v}1.1 and Na_{v}1.2) with an EC_{50} of approximately 7 nM when tested in human embryonic kidney 293 cells lines. Moreover, studies suggest that ATX-II interacts with glutamic acid residue (Glu-1613 and 1616 in Na_{v}1.2) on the third and fourth transmembrane loop (S3-S4) of domain IV on the alpha-subunit of neuronal channel Na_{v}1.2 in rats.

The K_{D} of type IIa Na+ channels for ATX II is 76 ± 6 nM. In small and large dorsal root ganglion cells mainly Na_{v}1.1, Na_{v}1.2 and Na_{v}1.6 are sensitive to ATX-II. The binding of the toxin can only occur when the sodium channel is open.

== Mode of action ==
The major action of ATX-II is to delay sodium channel inactivation. Studies using giant crayfish axons and myelinated fibers from frogs indicate that ATX-II acts at low doses, without changing the opening mechanism or steady-state potassium conductance. This mode of action is caused by binding of ATX-II across the extracellular loop. ATX-II slows conformational changes or translocation that are necessary for closing the sodium channel. When applied externally in high concentrations (100 μM range), ATX-II reduces potassium conductance, yet without modifying the kinetic properties of the potassium channel.

ATX-II prolongs the duration of the cardiac action potential, as demonstrated in cultured embryonic chicken cardiac muscle cells. ATX-II also selectively activates A-fibers of peripheral nerves projecting to the sensory neuron of the dorsal root ganglia (DRG) by enhancing resurging currents in DRGs. This mechanism can thereby induce itch-like sensations and pain.

== Toxicity ==
People who got in contact with Anemonia sulcata reported symptoms such as pain and itch. The same symptoms were found in human research subjects after injection of ATX-II into their skin.

In cardiac muscle tissue of various mammals, ATX-II has been shown to produce large and potentially lethal increases in heart rate. The lethal dose of ATX-II for the crab Carcinus maenas is 2 μg/kg.
