= Miniprotein =

Long peptide with tertiary structure

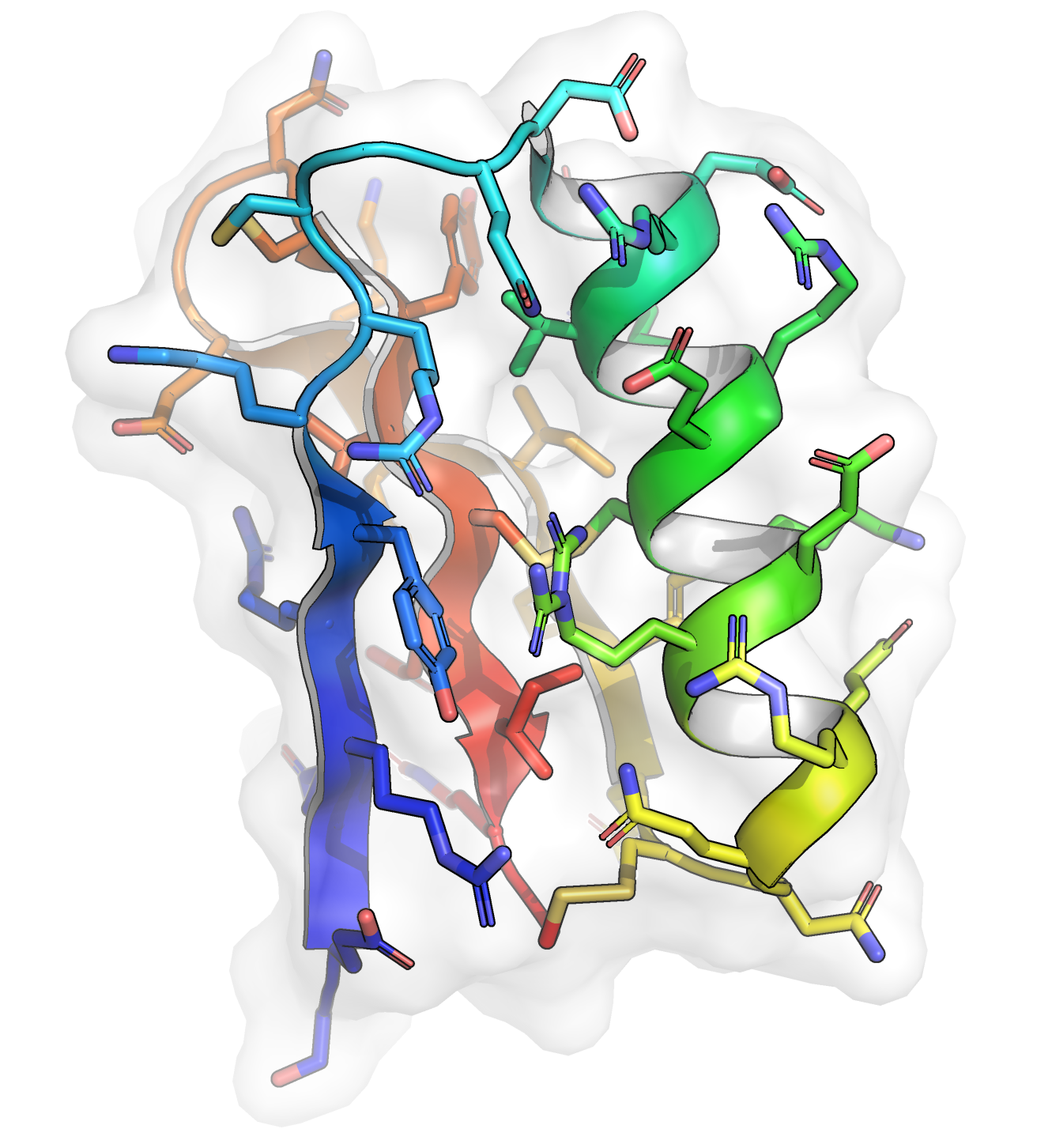
X-ray crystal structure of the first de novo designed disulfide-rich miniprotein gEHEE_06. PDB: 5JG9

A miniprotein is a type of peptide, characterized by the presence of protein tertiary structure. In nature, they are commonly found in the venom of animals such as scorpions, spiders, and cone snails. It is also possible to create miniproteins de novo using protein design.
