= Sunflower (disambiguation) =

Sunflower is the common sunflower (Helianthus annuus), a species of annual flowering plant first domesticated in the Americas. It can also refer more broadly to the whole genus Helianthus, the sunflowers.

Sunflower or sunflowers may also refer to:

== Art, entertainment and media ==
=== Film and television ===
- Sunflower (1970 film), an Italian film
- Sunflower (2005 film), a Chinese film
- Sunflower (2006 film), a South Korean film
- Sunflower (2023 film), an Australian film
- "Sunflowers" (Ted Lasso), an episode of the television series Ted Lasso
- "Sunflower", an episode of the television series Foyle's War
- Sunflower (web series), an Indian web series

=== Music ===
- Sunflower Records, a record label
- Sunflowers (band), a Sri Lankan band
- Henry Vestine (1944–1997), American guitarist known as "The Sunflower"

==== Albums ====
- Sunflower (The Beach Boys album), 1970
- Sunflower (Milt Jackson album), 1972
- Sunflower (Never Shout Never album), 2013
- Sunflower (single album), by Choi Yoo-jung, 2022

==== Songs ====
- "Sunflower" (Glen Campbell song), 1977
- "Sunflower" (Paul Weller song), 1993
- "Sunflower" (Post Malone and Swae Lee song), 2018
- "Sunflower" (Vampire Weekend song), 2019
- "Sunflower", a song by Raffi on his 1995 album Raffi Radio
- "Sunflower", a song by Red Velvet on their 2024 extended play Cosmic
- "Sunflower", a song by Rex Orange County
- "Sunflowers", a song by Everclear on the album So Much for the Afterglow

=== Fictional characters ===
- Sunflower, a character from the video game Plants vs. Zombies
- Sunflower, a deleted character from the 1940 Disney film Fantasia

=== Other media ===
- Sunflowers (Van Gogh series), a series of 1880s paintings by Vincent van Gogh
- Sunflowers (Nolde), a 1926 painting by Emil Nolde
- The Sunflower (book), by Simon Wiesenthal

== Businesses ==
- Sunflower Corporation, an American daylighting company based in Boulder, Colorado
- Sunflower Farmers Market, an American grocery store chain
- Sunflowers Interactive Entertainment Software, a game developer

== Military and politics ==
- Operation Sunflower, the 1941 World War II deployment of German troops to North Africa
- Operation Sunflower, the 1944 World War II German attempt to hold back the advancing Allied Forces in the Battle of Normandy
- Sunflower Student Movement, a series of protests that took place in Taiwan in 2014
- The Sunflower, a 2001 Italian electoral alliance

== Places ==
=== United States ===
- Sunflower, Alabama
- Sunflower, Arizona
- Sunflower, Kansas
- Sunflower, Wichita, Kansas
- Sunflower, Mississippi
- Sunflower, West Virginia
- Sunflower, Wisconsin
- Sunflower County, Mississippi
- Sunflower Army Ammunition Plant, in Johnson County, Kansas

== Other uses ==
- Sunflower (cocktail), a cocktail made with gin
- Sunflower (mathematics), a system of sets
- Sunflower, a signal used in the British rail Automatic Warning System
- The Sunflower (Țuculescu), painting by Ion Țuculescu
- Hidden Disabilities Sunflower, a British scheme to help disabled people find assistance

== See also ==
- The Sunflower State, a nickname for Kansas, US
- Kasumi Seizō, a character from the Samurai Champloo manga and anime series known as the "samurai who smells of sunflowers"
- Helianthus (disambiguation)
