= Helianthus (disambiguation) =

Helianthus is a genus of plants comprising sunflowers.

Helianthus may also refer to:

- USS Helianthus (SP-585), U.S. Navy patrol boat
- Helianthus III, a yacht listed on the National Register of Historic Places
- Heliaster helianthus, a species of starfish
- Stichodactyla helianthus, a species of sea anemone

== See also ==
- Actinia helianthus (disambiguation)
- Sunflower (disambiguation)
