= Actinia gigantea =

Actinia gigantea is a scientific synonym for two different species of sea anemone. It may refer to:

- Stichodactyla gigantea
- Stichodactyla haddoni
