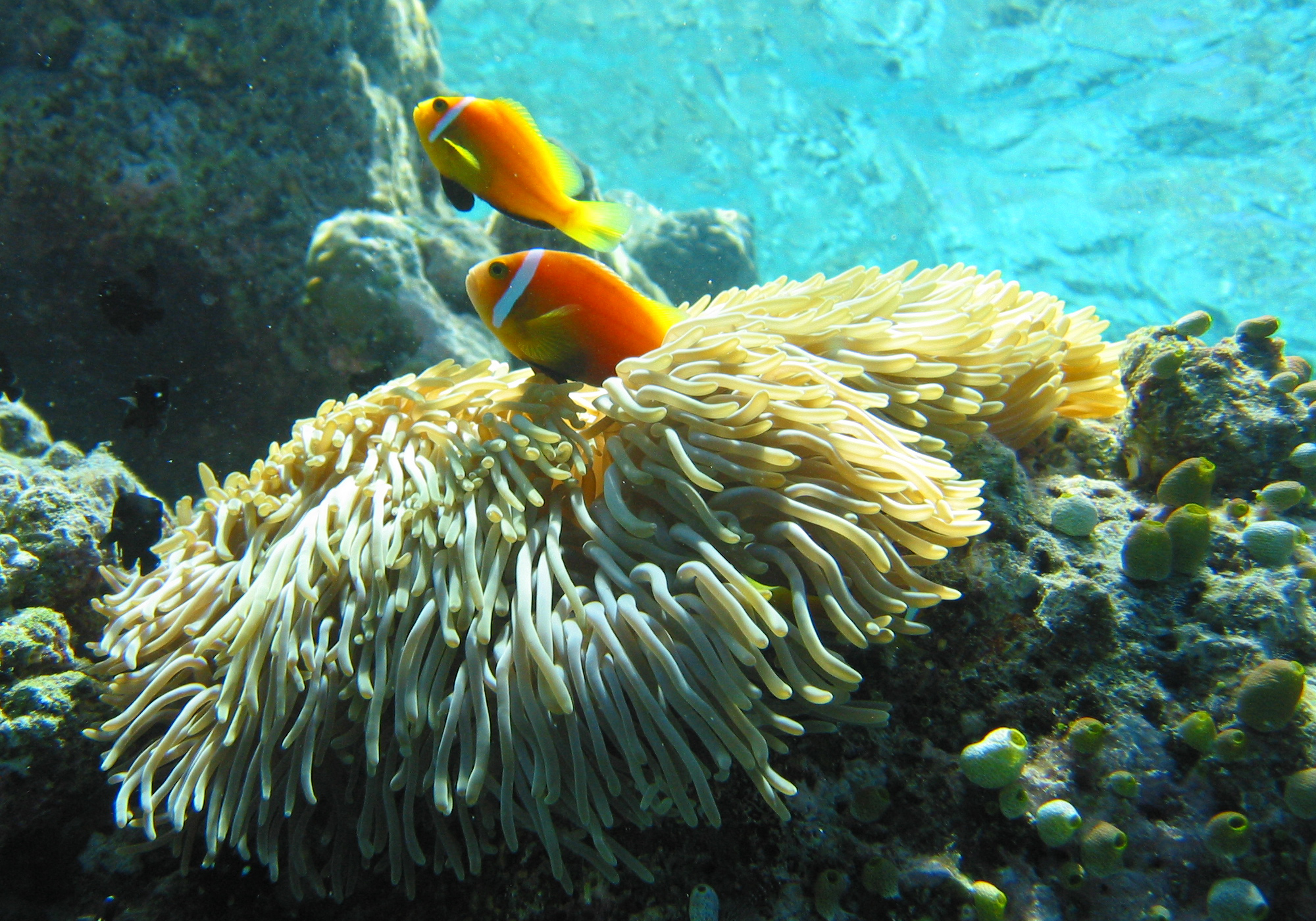
- Heteractis magnifica with Maldive anemonefish and juvenile threespot dascyllus

Scientific classification
- Kingdom: Animalia
- Phylum: Cnidaria
- Subphylum: Anthozoa
- Class: Hexacorallia
- Order: Actiniaria
- Suborder: Enthemonae
- Superfamily: Actinioidea
- Family: Stichodactylidae; Andres, 1883

Genera
- Radianthus; Stichodactyla

= Stichodactylidae =

Family of sea anemones

Stichodactylidae is a family of sea anemones that contains the genera Stichodactyla (carpet anemones) and Radianthus. These species reside exclusively within the shallow waters of the tropical Indo-Pacific area and are in the main family of sea anemones that hosts several varieties of clownfishes. Most species of sea anemones are harmless to humans, but at least some species of the genus Stichodactyla are highly venomous and their sting may cause anaphylactic shock and organ failure (notably acute liver failure). In contrast, the venom of Radianthus spp. has shown potential in the treatment of lung cancer.

== Discovery ==
C. Collingwood first reported species of the genus Stichodactylidae in 1868 after taking note of the existence of gigantic sea-anemones in the China Sea, containing quasi-parasitic fish.

== Genera and species ==
The following species are recognized within the family Stichodactylidae:

- Genus Radianthus Kwietniewski, 1896
  - Radianthus crispa (Hemprich & Ehrenberg in Ehrenberg, 1834)
  - Radianthus doreensis (Quoy & Gaimard, 1833)
  - Radianthus magnifica (Quoy & Gaimard, 1833)
  - Radianthus malu (Haddon & Shackleton, 1893)
- Genus Stichodactyla Brandt, 1835 (carpet anemones)
  - Stichodactyla gigantea (Forsskål, 1775)
  - Stichodactyla haddoni (Saville-Kent, 1893)
  - Stichodactyla helianthus (Ellis, 1768)
  - Stichodactyla mertensii Brandt, 1835
  - Stichodactyla tapetum (Hemprich & Ehrenberg in Ehrenberg, 1834)

== Gallery ==
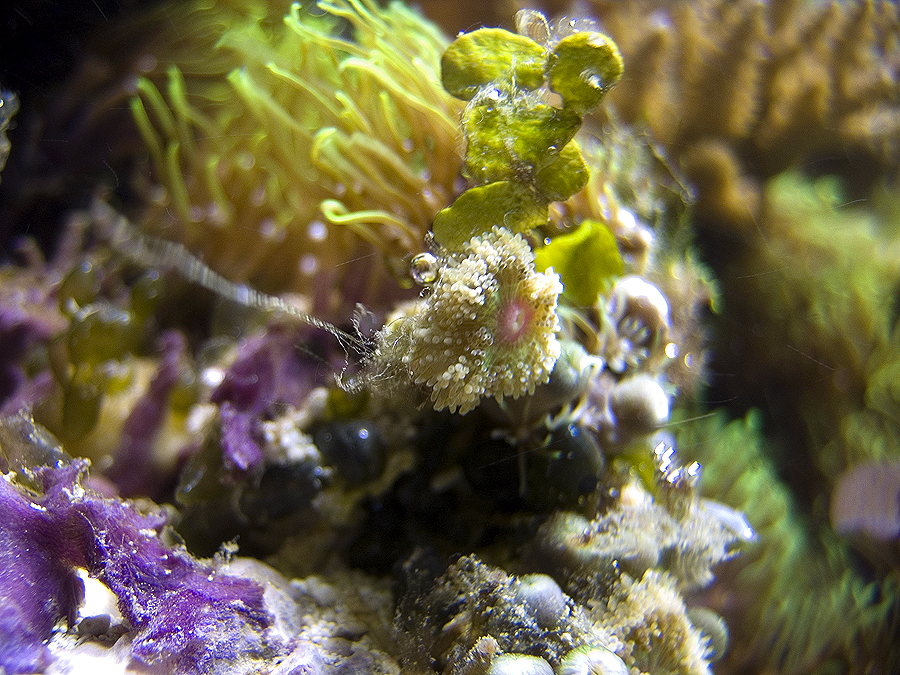
Stichodactyla tapetum

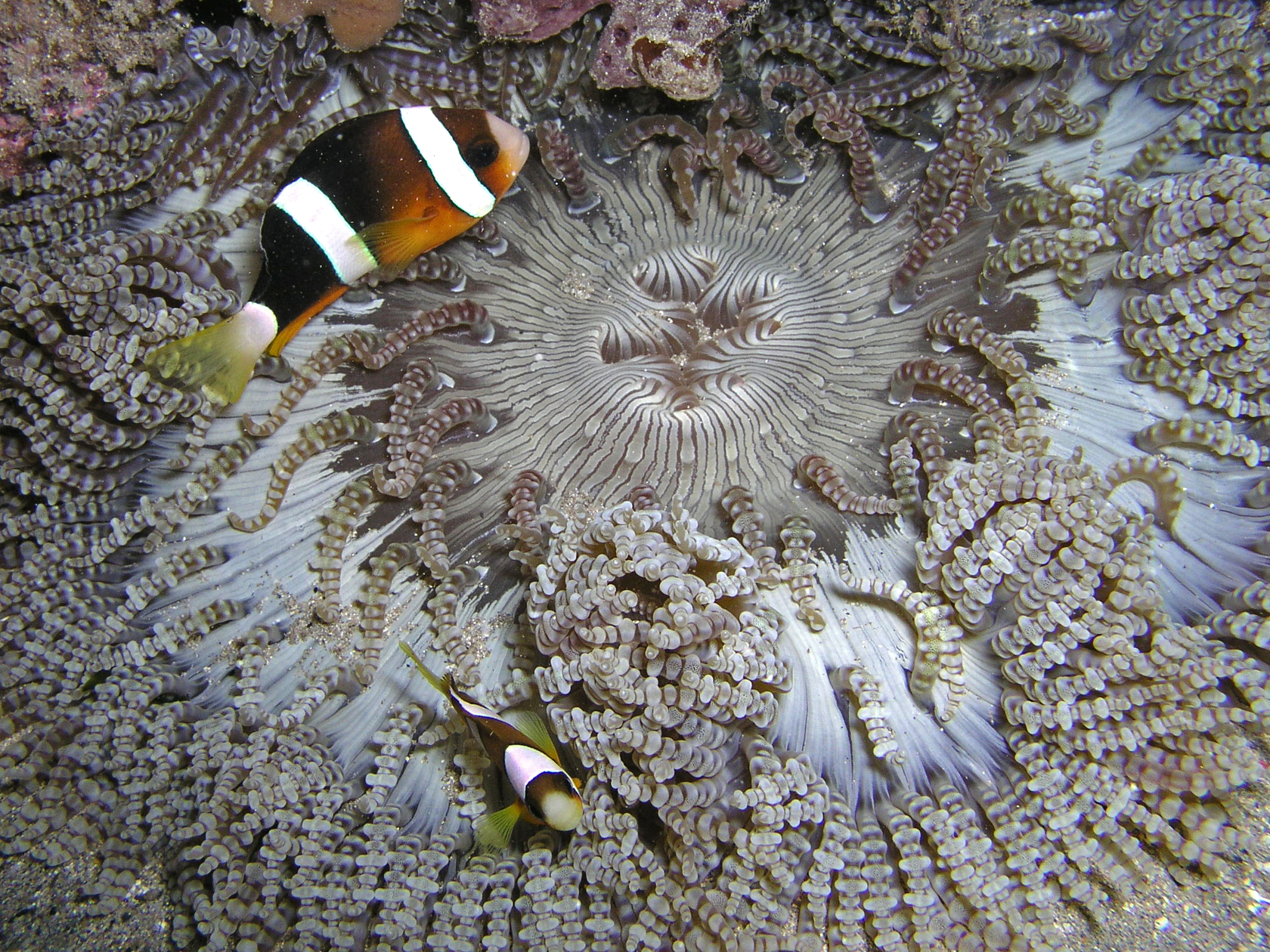
Heteractis aurora

Stichodactylidae
