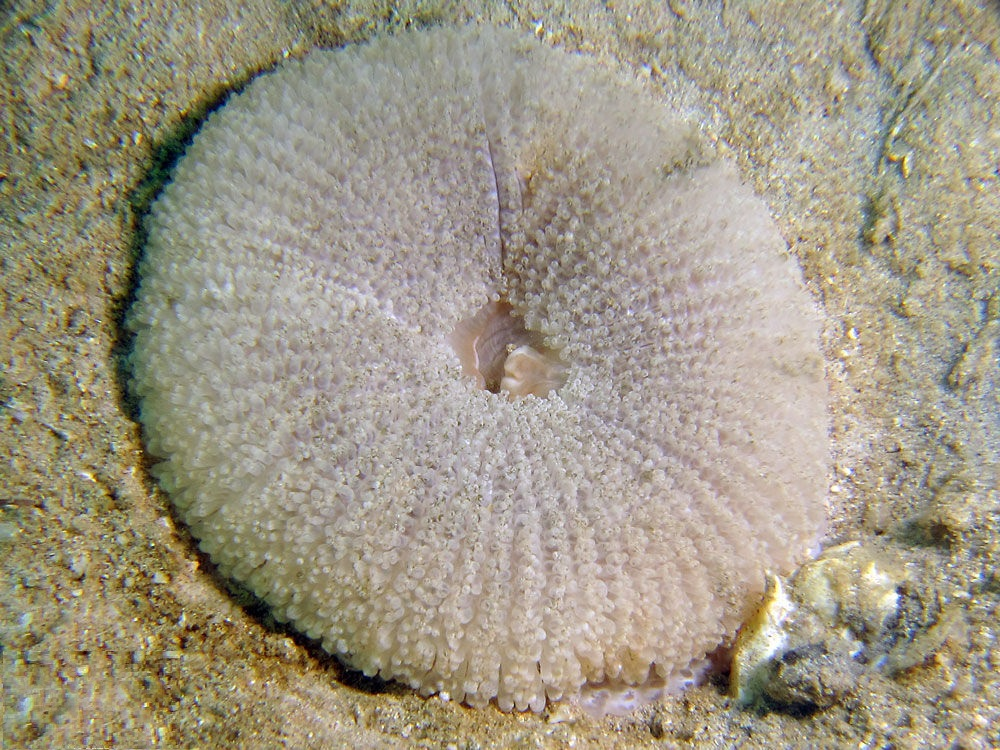

Scientific classification
- Domain: Eukaryota
- Kingdom: Animalia
- Phylum: Cnidaria
- Subphylum: Anthozoa
- Class: Hexacorallia
- Order: Actiniaria
- Family: Stichodactylidae
- Genus: Stichodactyla
- Species: S. tapetum

Binomial name
- Stichodactyla tapetum (Hemprich & Ehrenberg, 1834)

Synonyms
- List: Actinia tapetum Hemprich & Ehrenberg in Ehrenberg, 1834; Discosoma ambonensis Kwietniewski, 1898; Discosoma tapetum (Hemprich & Ehrenberg in Ehrenberg, 1834); Discosomoides tapetum (Hemprich & Ehrenberg in Ehrenberg, 1834); Homactis rupicola Verrill, 1869; Isacmaea tapetum (Hemprich & Ehrenberg in Ehrenberg, 1834); Ricordea rupicola; Stoichactis ambonensis (Kwietniewski, 1897); Stoichactis australis Lager, 1911; Stoichactis laevis Lager, 1911; Stoichactis rupicola (Verrill, 1869); Stoichactis tapetum (Hemprich & Ehrenberg in Ehrenberg, 1834)

= Stichodactyla tapetum =

Species of sea anemone

Stichodactyla tapetum, commonly known as maxi-mini carpet anemone, is a species of sea anemone in the family Stichodactylidae. It is found in the Indo-Pacific area, primarily around Vietnam.

== Description ==
S. tapetum is characterized by an oral disc covered in groups of bump like tentacles. The tentacle groups are not typically packed tightly leaving open space to see the oral disc. The tentacles have a rounded tip that is commonly green or brown. Many other colors are exhibited as well such as red, purple, and orange.

== Distribution and habitat ==
S. tapetum is found near shores and tidepools and is widespread throughout the tropical waters of the Indo-Pacific.
