= Actinia helianthus =

Actinia helianthus is an unaccepted scientific name and may refer to two species of sea anemones:

- Bubble-tip anemone (Entacmaea quadricolor), found in the Indo-Pacific Ocean
- Stichodactyla helianthus, found in the Caribbean Sea
