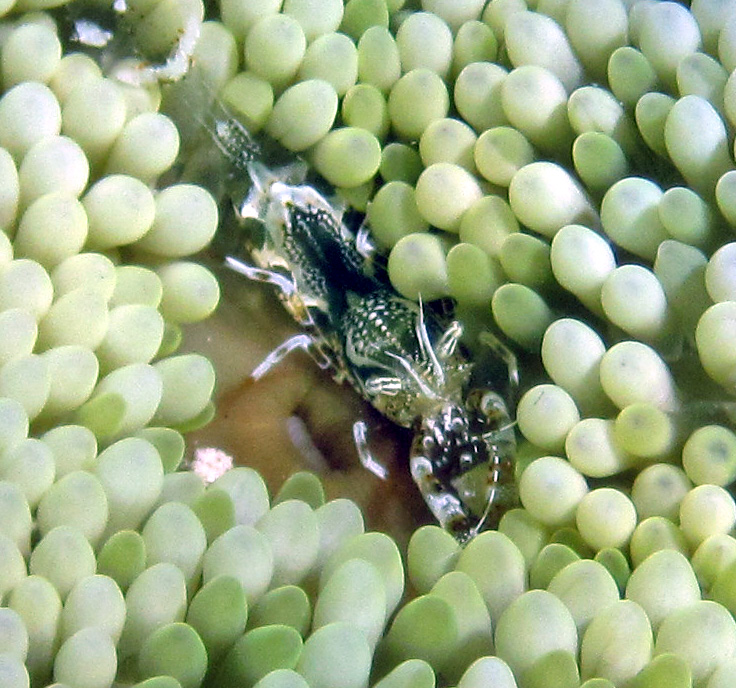

Scientific classification
- Domain: Eukaryota
- Kingdom: Animalia
- Phylum: Arthropoda
- Class: Malacostraca
- Order: Decapoda
- Suborder: Pleocyemata
- Infraorder: Caridea
- Family: Palaemonidae
- Genus: Periclimenes
- Species: P. rathbunae

Binomial name
- Periclimenes rathbunae Schmitt, 1924

= Periclimenes rathbunae =

Species of crustacean

Periclimenes rathbunae is a species of shrimp in the family Palaemonidae, also known as the sun anemone shrimp. It is found in the Caribbean Sea, the Gulf of Mexico, Florida and the Bahamas. It was first described by American biologist Waldo LaSalle Schmitt in 1924 and named in honor of American zoologist Mary J. Rathbun. This shrimp is usually found living in association with the sea anemone Stichodactyla helianthus or occasionally with Condylactis gigantea.

== Description ==
This shrimp grows to a length of about 2.5 cm (1 in). In general it is clear and colourless, but there are many small orange and white spots on the appendages that sometimes lie close together and form bands. The carapace is clear with a partial dorsal saddle of orange and white spots, and the somites have clear dorsal saddles with orange edges, outlined faintly in white. The sea anemone with which this shrimp usually associates, Stichodactyla helianthus, is generally green or olive, and the associated shrimp may have a slight greenish tinge; it may appear rather more intense green because of light transmitted through its body.

If its usual host is not available, P. rathbunae may associate with the giant Caribbean sea anemone (Condylactis gigantea). The tentacles of this anemone have a wide range of colouring including white, pink, orange, pale blue and tan, usually with paler tips, and the shrimps associated with it exhibit a limited ability to match their host, with a greater degree of white spotting and with no greenish tinge.

== Distribution and habitat ==
P. rathbunae is native to the Bahamas, Florida, the Caribbean Sea and the Gulf of Mexico. It is found at depths between about 1 and 18 m (3 and 59 ft).

== Ecology ==
P. rathbunae is often associated with the sea anemone Stichodactyla helianthus in a commensal arrangement. In Tobago, most sea anemones of this species have associated shrimps, with an average of 3.4 shrimps per occupied anemone, and a maximum of eleven shrimps. The shrimps live among the anemone's tentacles and seem immune to attack by the host's nematocysts. It has been found that if a shrimp is separated from an anemone for as little as twenty-four hours, it loses its immunity. A period of up to five hours is then required to re-establish the immunity, during which time cautious contact is made by the shrimp. The mechanism involved in the immunity may involve the coating of the shrimp with anemone mucus, after which it becomes chemically camouflaged.
