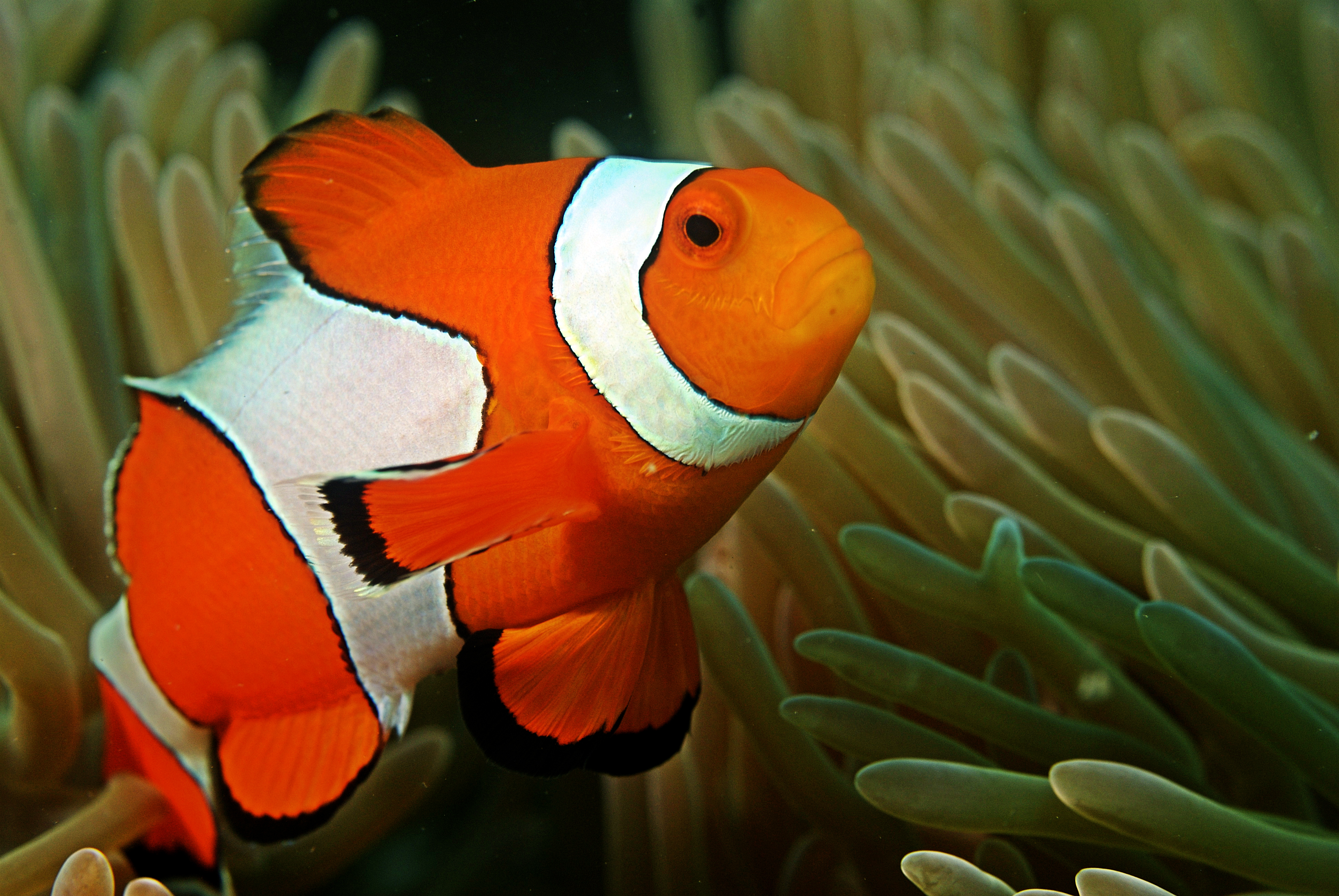
- In the Andaman Islands

Conservation status
- Least Concern (IUCN 3.1)

Scientific classification
- Kingdom: Animalia
- Phylum: Chordata
- Class: Actinopterygii
- Division: Teleostei
- Order: Blenniiformes
- Family: Pomacentridae
- Genus: Amphiprion
- Species: A. ocellaris

Binomial name
- Amphiprion ocellaris Cuvier, 1830

Synonyms
- Amphiprion bicolor Castelnau, 1873; Amphiprion melanurus Cuvier, 1830

= Ocellaris clownfish =

Species of fish

The ocellaris clownfish (Amphiprion ocellaris), also known as the false percula clownfish or common clownfish, is a marine fish belonging to the family Pomacentridae, which includes clownfishes and damselfishes. A. ocellaris are found in different colors, depending on where they are located. For example, black A. ocellaris with white bands can be found near northern Hawaii, USA, North America, Australia, Southeast Asia, and Japan. Orange or red-brown A. ocellaris also exist with three similar white bands on the body and head. A. ocellaris can be distinguished from other Amphiprion species based on the number of pectoral rays and dorsal spines. A. ocellaris are known to grow about 11 cm (4.3 inches) long. Females are larger than males. The life cycle of A. ocellaris varies in whether they reside at the surface or bottom of the ocean. When they initially hatch, they reside near the surface. However, when A. ocellaris enter into the juvenile stage of life, they travel down to the bottom to find shelter in a host anemone. Once they find their anemone, they form a symbiotic relationship with them.

== Taxonomy ==
A. ocellaris belongs is a ray-finned bony fish in the family Pomacentridae. A. ocellaris is sister to Amphiprion percula, the orange clownfish. Evidence indicates that ancestrally, Amphiprion clownfish could withstand the stings of only one type of anemone; after further speciation the 28 different species of clownfish, including A. ocellaris, have specialized to be able to resist the poisonous stings of many different anemone species.

== Description ==
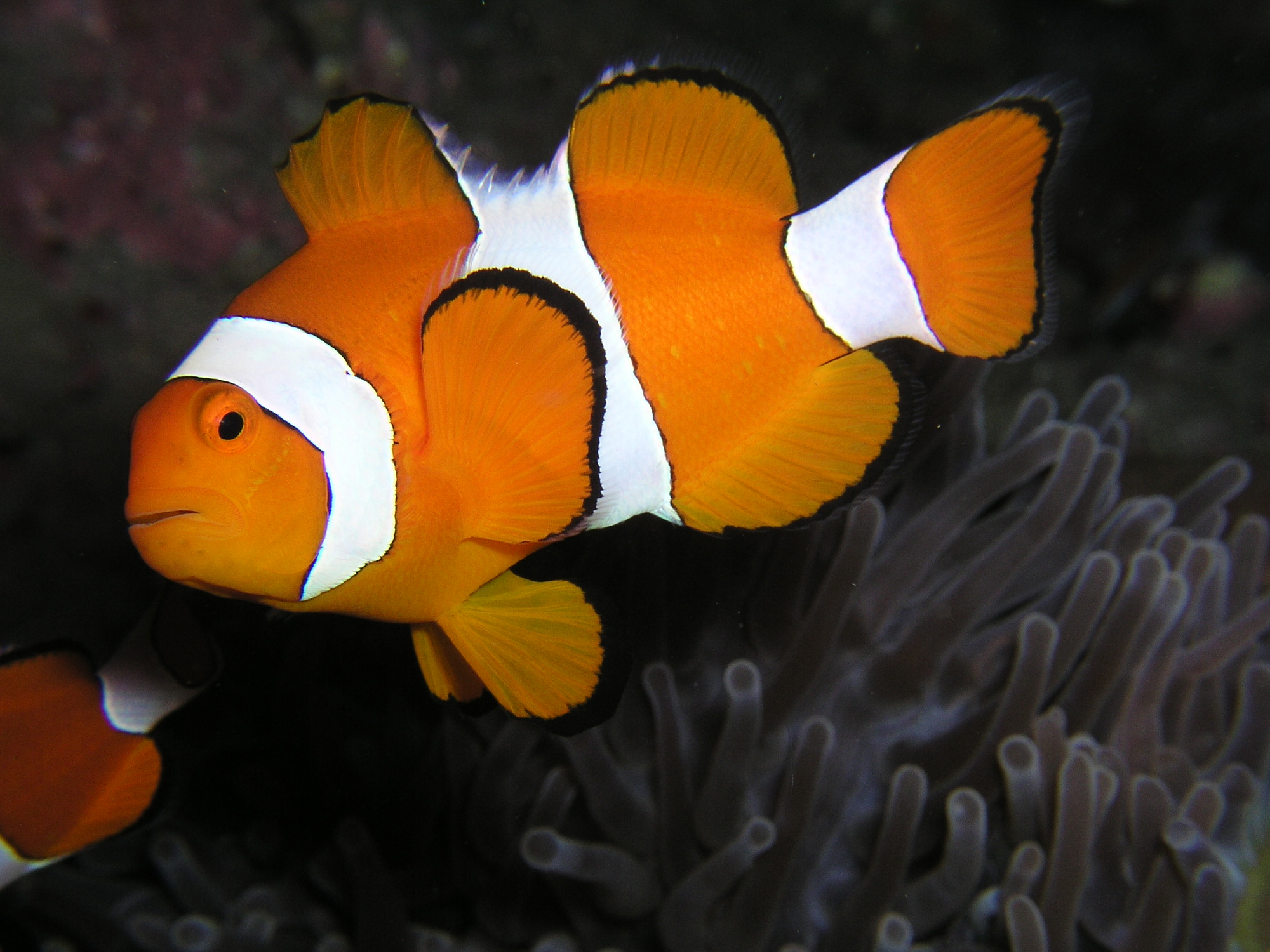
A. ocellaris showing dorsal spines, in Timor Leste. While the closely related A. percula has 10 (rarely 9) dorsal spines, A. ocellaris has 11 (rarely 10).

The common clownfish is a small fish which grows up to 11 cm (4.3 inches). Its body has a stocky appearance and oval shape. It is compressed laterally, with a round profile. The coloration of its body is orange to reddish-brown, but it can also be black in some particular areas such as the Northern Territory in Australia. It has three vertical white stripes outlined with a fine black line. The first passes just behind the eye, the second in the middle of the body widens forward to the head centrally and the third one circles the caudal peduncle. All the fins are also outlined with a fine black line. A. ocellaris is often confused with Amphiprion percula, which possesses exactly the same colours and patterns at first sight but distinguishes itself by the thickness of the black outlines. Additionally, A. ocellaris has a taller dorsal fin, and typically possesses 11 dorsal-fin spines vs. 10 spines in Amphiprion percula.

== Distribution and habitat ==
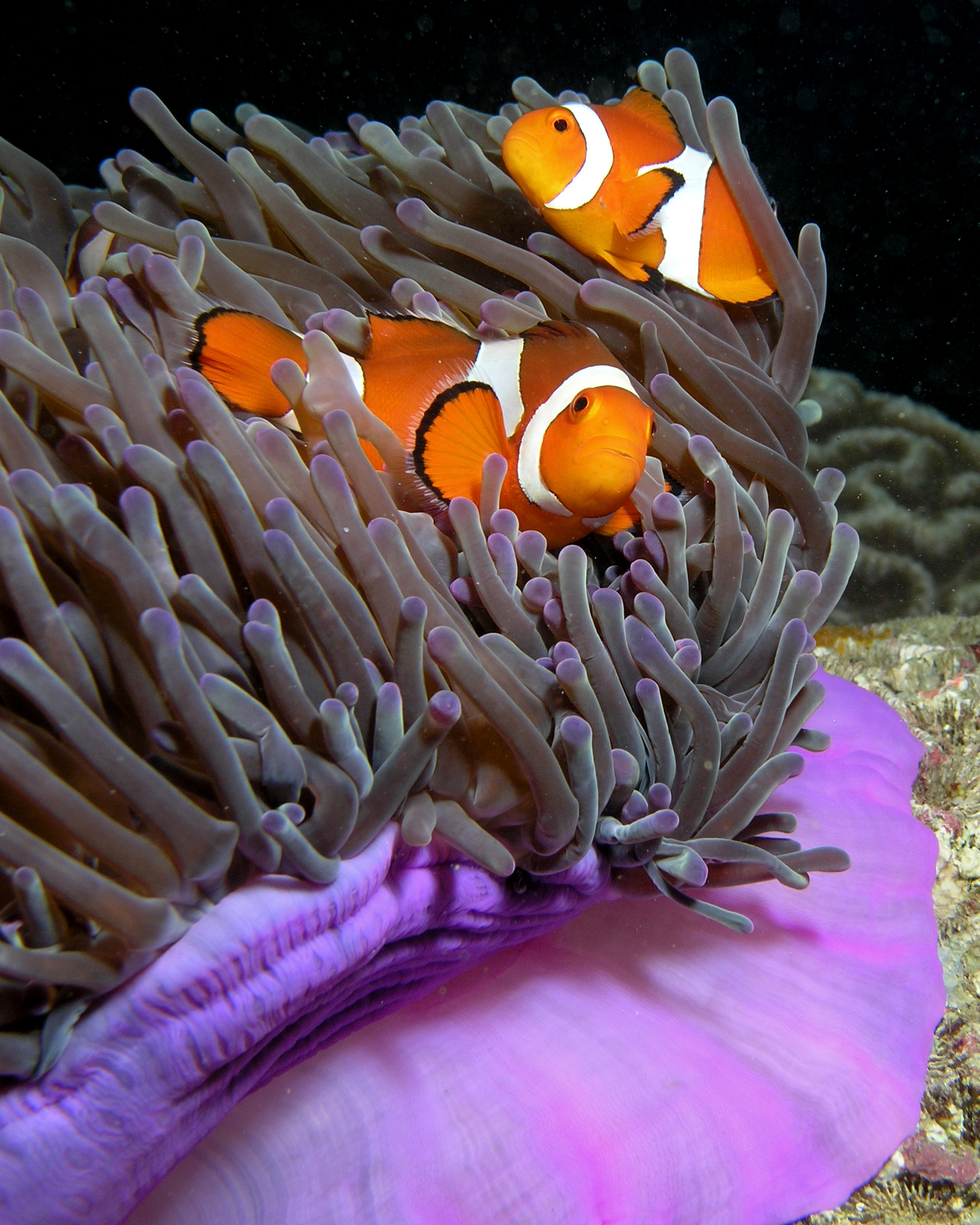
Purple anemone (Heteractis magnifica) and resident anemonefish (Amphiprion ocellaris) in Timor Leste

This species is found in the Eastern Indian Ocean and in the western Pacific Ocean. As mentioned earlier, they can also be found in Hawaii, USA, North America, Northern Australia, Southeast Asia and Japan.

Amphiprion ocellaris typically lives in small groups on outer reef slopes or in sheltered lagoons at a maximal depth of 15 meters. It inhabits three different species of sea anemones: Heteractis magnifica, Stichodactyla gigantea and Stichodactyla mertensii and have symbiotic relationships with the anemone.

== Behavior ==
Amphiprion ocellaris is a diurnal fish. It is a protandrous hermaphrodite, which means the male can change its sex to female during its life, and lives in a harem in which an established dominance hierarchy manages the group and keeps individuals at a specific social rank. It is aggressively territorial and is completely dependent on its sea anemone.

=== Shelter ===
Amphiprion ocellaris are reliant on sea anemone for shelter (they have a symbiotic relationship with the sea anemone). Sea anemone are protection for the fish and their nests. This is because when A. ocellaris are in the open waters, they have a higher risk of predation. It is postulated that the fanning behavior of the fish and removal of parasites promotes the health of sea anemones which contain A. ocellaris fish. In addition, the anemone provides protection for the fish with its tentacles, however, the fish's mucus protection prevents it from being stung by the tentacles. The presence of the clownfish can be interpreted as a lure to attract potential anemone's preys close to the tentacles. And the clownfish can also defend the anemone against some reef fishes which could eat the tentacles.

=== Social system ===
Ocellaris clownfish in the National Marine Aquarium, Plymouth

Social systems can be defined as society considered as a system organized by a characteristic pattern of relationships. A. ocellaris form specific social hierarchies within their societies. These social hierarchies result in competition to travel between the different levels of society, which is seen between various ages as well.

==== Queue selection ====
Queues is the term for social groups of A. ocellaris. This is because these fish form social hierarchies, or social rank, by outliving the more dominant members of the group. The dominant pair of each queue reproduces more compared to the subordinate fishes. This is the reason for why these individuals should adopt various tactics in which they increase their probability of attaining social dominance. There are two types of A. ocellaris, settlers and switchers. Settlers prefer shorter queues, while switchers will usually move after settlement. However, studies show that there is no difference in the characteristics between switchers and non-switchers, and there is no data demonstrating that A. ocellaris utilize the switching tactic for dominance. Although settlement preferences increase the likelihood of gaining social dominance, switching could have the function of increasing social dominance benefits after social dominance has been acquired.

==== Juvenile Amphiprion ocellaris ====
Juvenile A. ocellaris have difficulty finding a sea anemone to live in (since they need anemone for survival and shelter). The difficulty also arises in the fact that there exists a hierarchy in each anemone. Thus, when a new juvenile enters an anemone, it begins at the bottom of the social ladder where it is often the victim of aggression by other clownfish. This aggression from other A. ocellaris in the anemone can cause the juvenile to be chased out of the anemone, and left to search for another anemone.

==== Group size and patch size ====
Studies have shown that there is a correlation between the size of the group and the size of the patch; however this correlation provides no implication that subordinate group members have less resources. More likely, it is the effects of the patch size on the group member that dominates interactions. An experiment was performed to study the mechanism responsible for the positive correlation between the group size and patch size. The scientists argued that the correlation between the group size and patch size is because of the indirect consequence of the positive relationship between the dominant group member's length and the anemone size. The length of the dominant group member limits the group size because the length of the dominant group member prevents the group of the subordinate group members. This data shows that the patch size and group size correlation does not necessarily imply the decrease in resources of group members subordinate to the dominant group member.

=== Food habits ===
Amphiprion ocellaris feed on plankton and algae, thus they are considered omnivores. Feeding is also affected by the hierarchy in A. ocellaris groups. Since the smaller, less dominant fish face aggression from the more aggressive fish, they have less energy to forage for food. Thus, they usually do not eat as much as the dominant fish do, because of reduced energy, but also because of the increased danger they face when they leave their anemone since they are smaller. In other words, the larger fish will usually travel farther than the smaller fish. Generally, the A. ocellaris feed on algae, copepods, and zooplankton.

=== Reproduction and life history ===
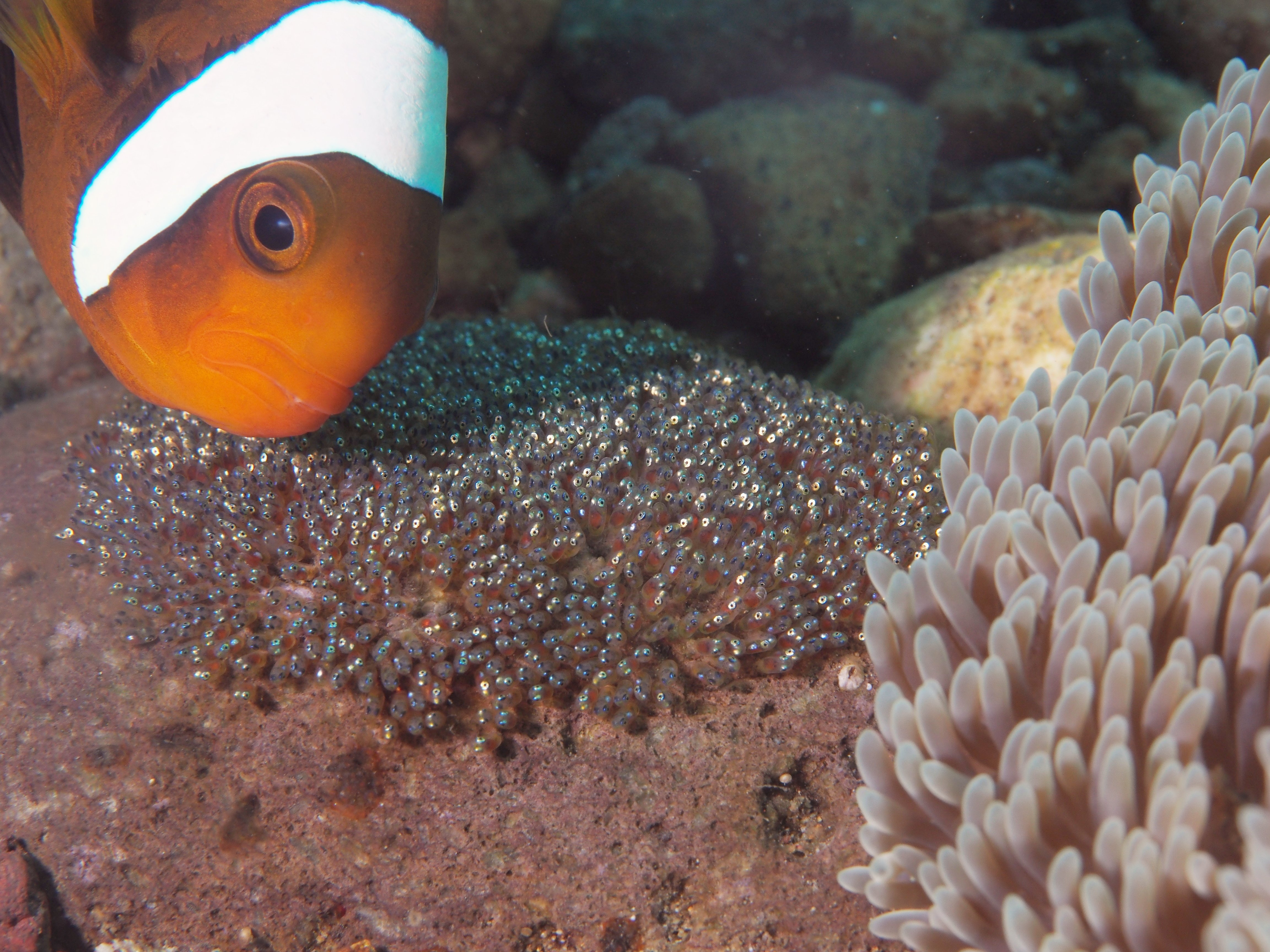
A. ocellaris with fry, in the Philippines

Amphiprion ocellaris have reproductive behaviors very similar to that of all anemonefish. They have monogamous mating systems, and in their spawning processes, they also have the same levels of aggressiveness between males and females. In addition, there is a reproductive hierarchy that exists between age and sex.

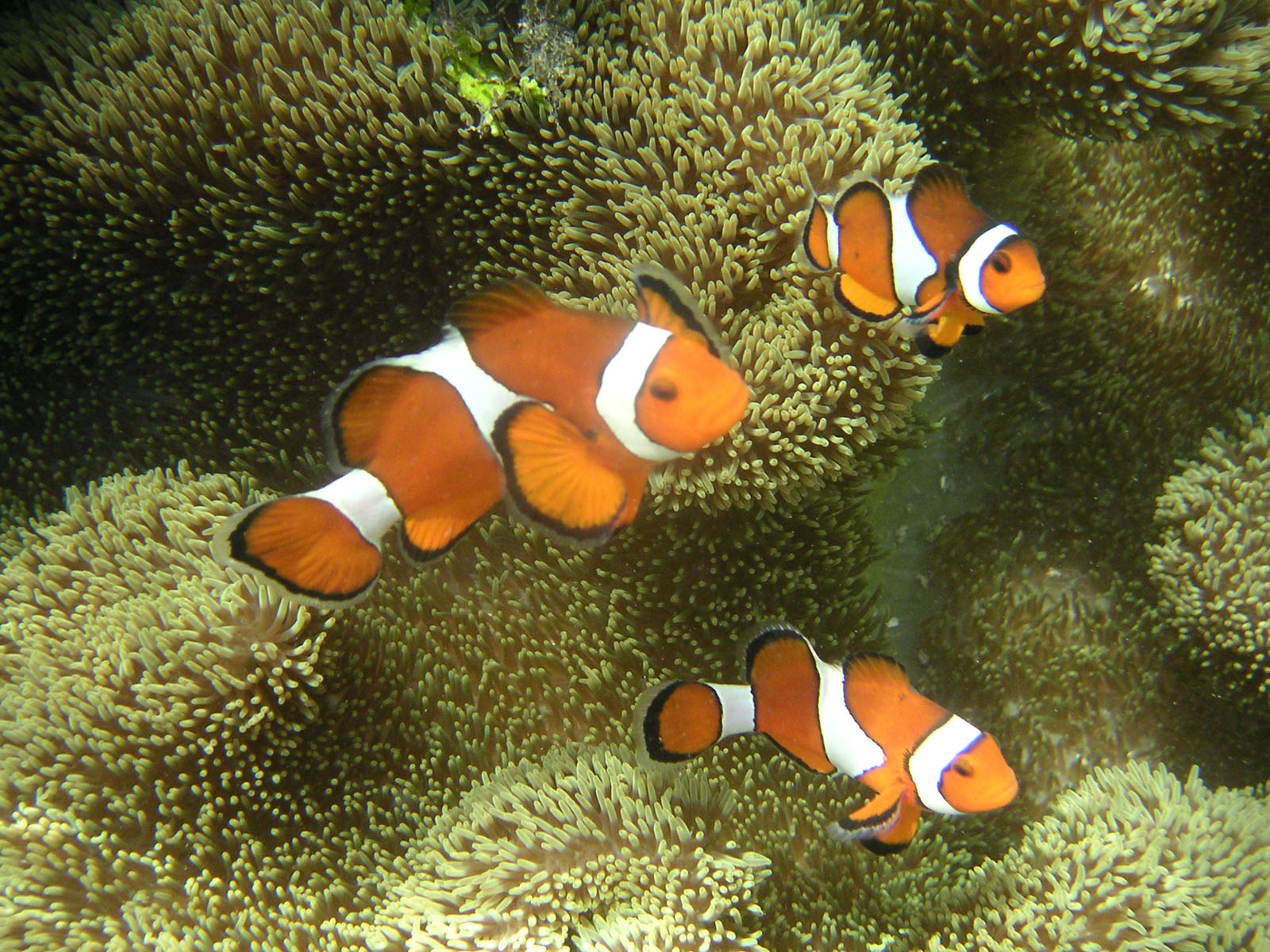
Clownfish are initially male; the largest fish in a group becomes female. In Okinawa.

==== Spawning ====
There is not much data on the reproduction of A. ocellaris. However, similar behaviors throughout all anemone fishes have been recorded. These fish have monogamous mating systems, and are territorial of their anemone. Males become more aggressive during spawning. Male behavior also changes to attract females: biting, chasing, fin extension. Before spawning, the male prepares the nest near the anemone (so that the tentacles of the anemone can protect the nest). After the male chases the female to the nest, the female begins the spawning process. She lays eggs for about one to two hours, and then leaves the nest for the male to fertilize the eggs. The eggs take approximately six to eight days to hatch (this time period can be affected by the temperature of water). Because of the external fertilization, males usually care for the eggs. They also have responsibilities for eating fungi-infected or infertile eggs, and fanning the eggs.

==== Reproductive hierarchy ====
All anemonefish are protandrous hermaphrodites, meaning they first develop into males and may become females later in life. Anemonefish exhibit phenotypic plasticity when males, females, and juveniles inhabit the same anemone. In an anemonefish social group, the female is the dominant and largest member, followed by the dominant male, while other anemonefish remain non-reproductive.

One experiment placed three juvenile anemonefish in a tank and observed their behaviors over the course of a month. The researchers drew conclusions about the fish's social hierarchy based on signs of dominance such as aggressive or appeasing behaviors, occupation of territory in the tank, and body mass increase. The dominant fish grew larger compared to lower-ranked fish, suggesting the lower-ranked fish experienced growth suppression. In addition, a difference in the fish's levels of certain steroids suggested that lower-ranked individuals also experienced reproductive suppression.

Another experiment demonstrated that when a female anemonefish is removed from the anemone, then the dominant male becomes the female and the next-highest-ranked male moves up the dominance hierarchy to become the dominant male. Females use aggressive dominance behavior to control the males, preventing the formation of other females, and dominant males prevent juvenile males from mating.

== In aquaria ==
In nature, the false percula clownfish is hosted by Heteractis magnifica and Stichodactyla gigantea. However, in captivity in a reef aquarium, the false percula is hosted by other species of anemone, including Entacmaea quadricolor. In addition, clownfish may adopt a surrogate host as opposed to an anemone, such as Euphyllia divisa, xenia coral, etc.

While Amphiprion ocellaris is found in fully marine environments in nature, i.e. a salinity of 35‰, in captivity they can be reared in brackish water with salinity as low as 15‰ without known adverse effects.

== Human interaction ==
Amphiprion ocellaris are utilized as part of the tropical fish aquarium trade. However, only certain colors are in demand. In addition, A. ocellaris are used in research since they can be bred easily. This high demand in trade has been dangerous for A. ocellaris' population due to overexploitation.

== Popular culture ==
The main characters Marlin and his son Nemo from the 2003 Disney Pixar film Finding Nemo (as well as his late wife Coral), are ocellaris clownfish. After the film's release, this species, along with other species of clownfish, surged in popularity in the aquarium trade.
