= Ion Țuculescu =

Romanian oil painter

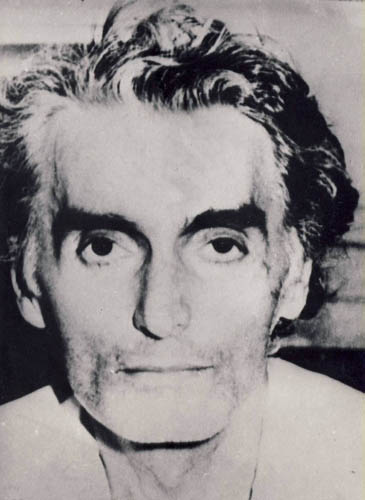
- Born: 19 May 1910; Craiova, Kingdom of Romania
- Died: 27 July 1962 (aged 52); Bucharest, Romanian People's Republic
- Resting place: Cernica Monastery, Ilfov County, Romania
- Known for: Painting
- Movement: expressionist

Ion Țuculescu (Romanian pronunciation: [iˈon t͡sukuˈlesku]; 19 May 1910 – 27 July 1962) was a Romanian expressionist and abstract oil painter, although professionally he worked as a biologist and physician. His artwork became well-known posthumously, when, in the spring of 1965, a major retrospective exhibition revealed him as one of the important post-World War II European modern artists.

== Biography ==
Born in Craiova, the son of Ioan and Verginica Țuculescu, he attended the Carol I High School in the city. In the art classes he was guided by teacher Eugen Ciolac, who taught him some of the techniques he was to use. His participation was first noted during the exhibition organized in 1925 in the reception hall of the Dolj County Administrative Palace. Although his artistic talent was becoming appreciated, Ţuculescu did not attend a higher-education art school; instead, he went to the Faculty of Natural Sciences within the University of Bucharest, where he would graduate in 1936. In parallel, he also attended the Bucharest Medical University, graduating magna cum laude in 1939.

Between 1930 and 1934, he took several trips to Greece, Turkey, Palestine, and Egypt, either together with Gala Galaction and his daughters, or with his own fiancée, Maria Fotiade (whom he married on May 5, 1935). It was during these trips that he retook to painting, being inspired by the Mediterranean landscapes.

His first personal exhibition would take place in 1938 in the Romanian Athenaeum hall of Bucharest. By 1960, Țuculescu had taken part in several collective exhibitions, and had also displayed his works at the Official Salon (in 1941 and 1945). He had had seven personal exhibitions at the Romanian Athenaeum.

With the exception of the war period, when he was drafted into the Romanian Army as a combat medic, the practice of medicine did not take up much of his time. Biology had become his second most important interest, and he worked as a scientific researcher within the Romanian Academy. An autodidact in painting, Țuculescu worked intensely after his second debut. Although he was continuously present in the artistic life of the time, his work found almost no response.

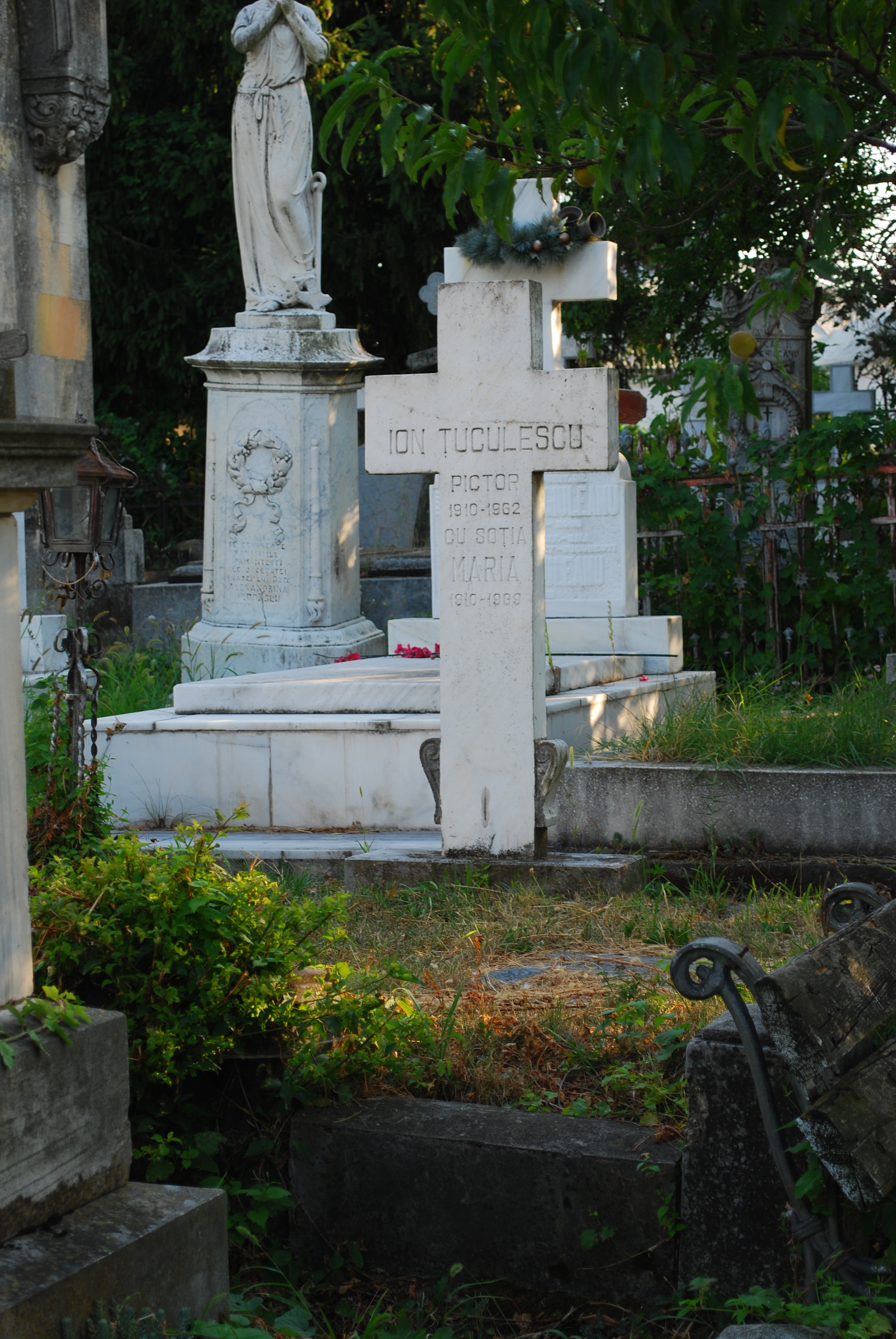
Țuculescu's grave at the monastery in Cernica

He died in Bucharest at the age of 52, and was buried in the Cernica Monastery graveyard, in the Galaction family vault.

== Art ==
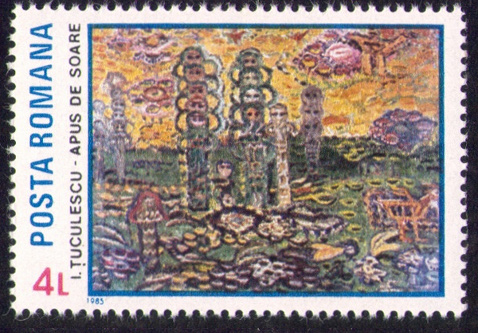
Sunset. Painting by Țuculescu on a 1985 Romanian stamp

Posthumously, his paintings would be the subject of critical acclaim, and, promoted by figures such as Petru Comarnescu, were the focus of numerous exhibitions inside Romania and abroad.

In his early years, Țuculescu's work was marked by the influence of figurative Expressionism, gathering themes and subjects from Romanian folklore. He did not abandon their influence as he moved toward abstract expressionism, making use of decorative elements originating in the folk art of his native region, Oltenia.

Țuculescu's paintings have in common with the drawings of American artist Jerry McDaniel "the bold use of strong, bright colors, and the expressivity of repetitive geometric elements".

== Noted paintings ==
- The Sunflower
