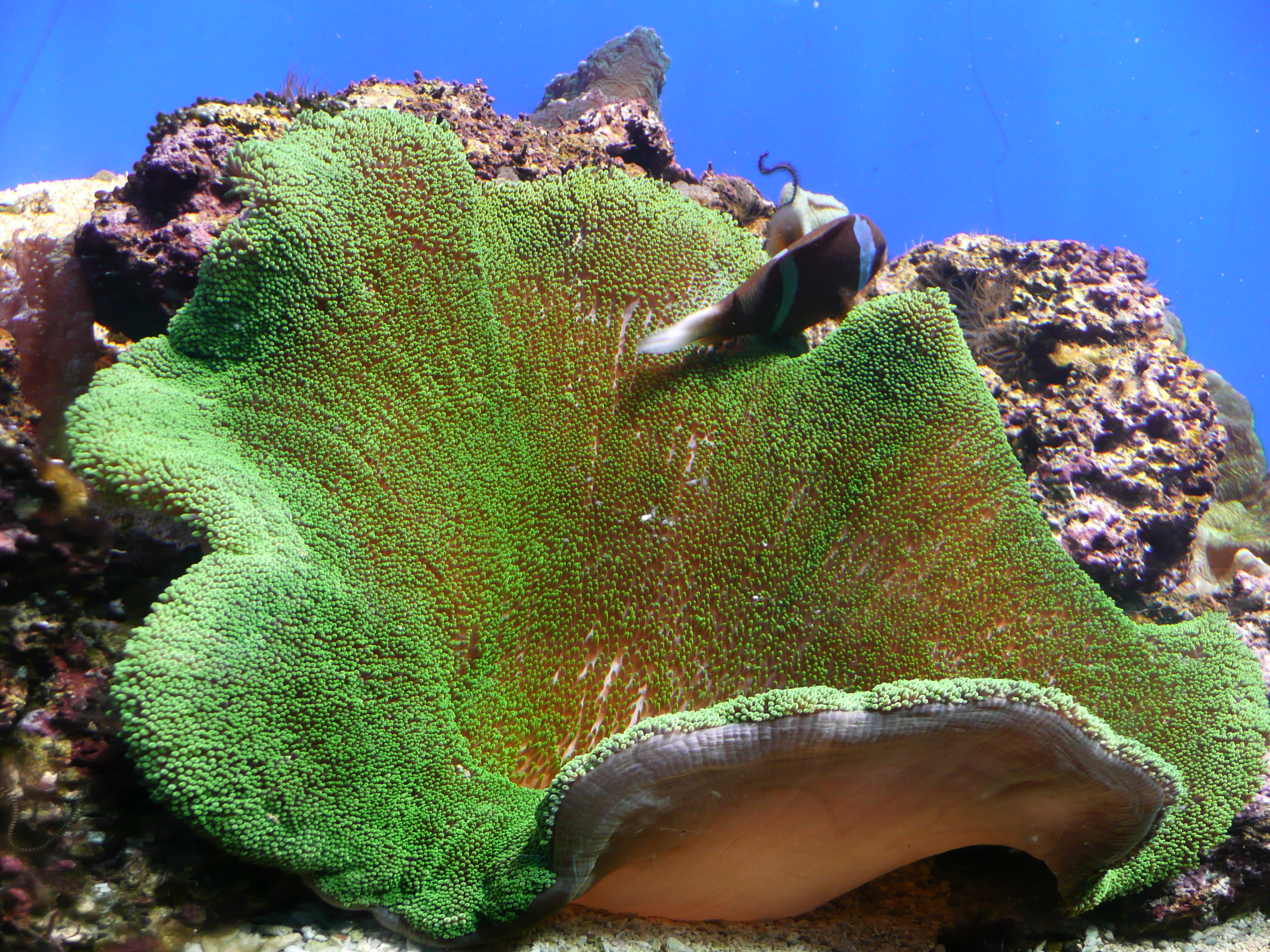

Scientific classification
- Kingdom: Animalia
- Phylum: Cnidaria
- Subphylum: Anthozoa
- Class: Hexacorallia
- Order: Actiniaria
- Family: Stichodactylidae
- Genus: Stichodactyla; Brandt, 1835

Synonyms
- Polyparium Korotneff, 1886; Stoichactis

= Stichodactyla =

Genus of sea anemones

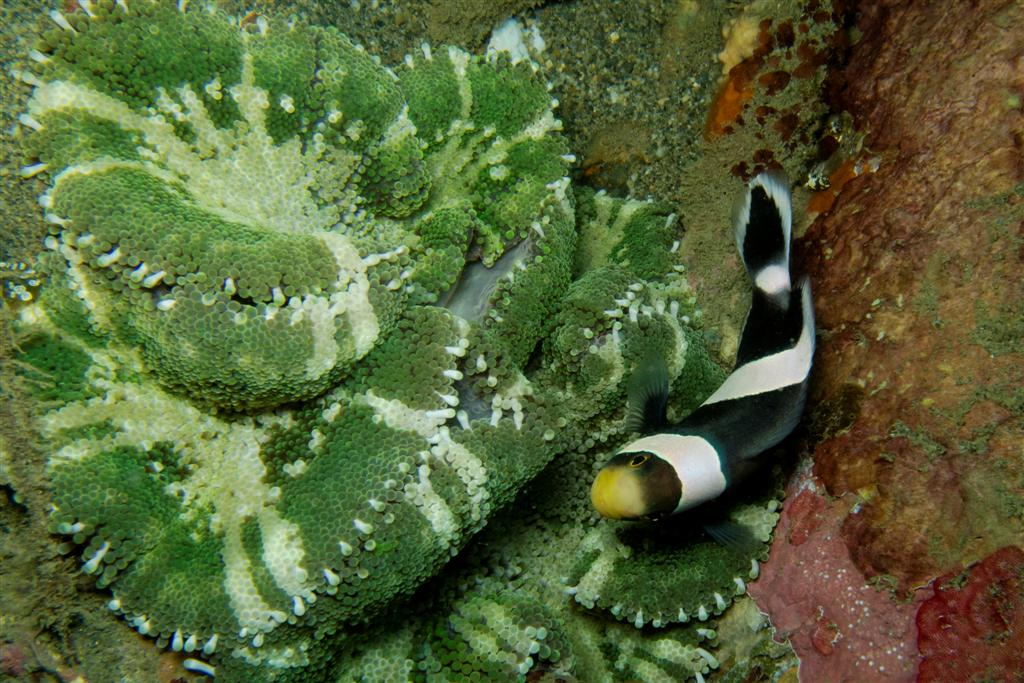
Amphiprion polymnus in S. Haddoni

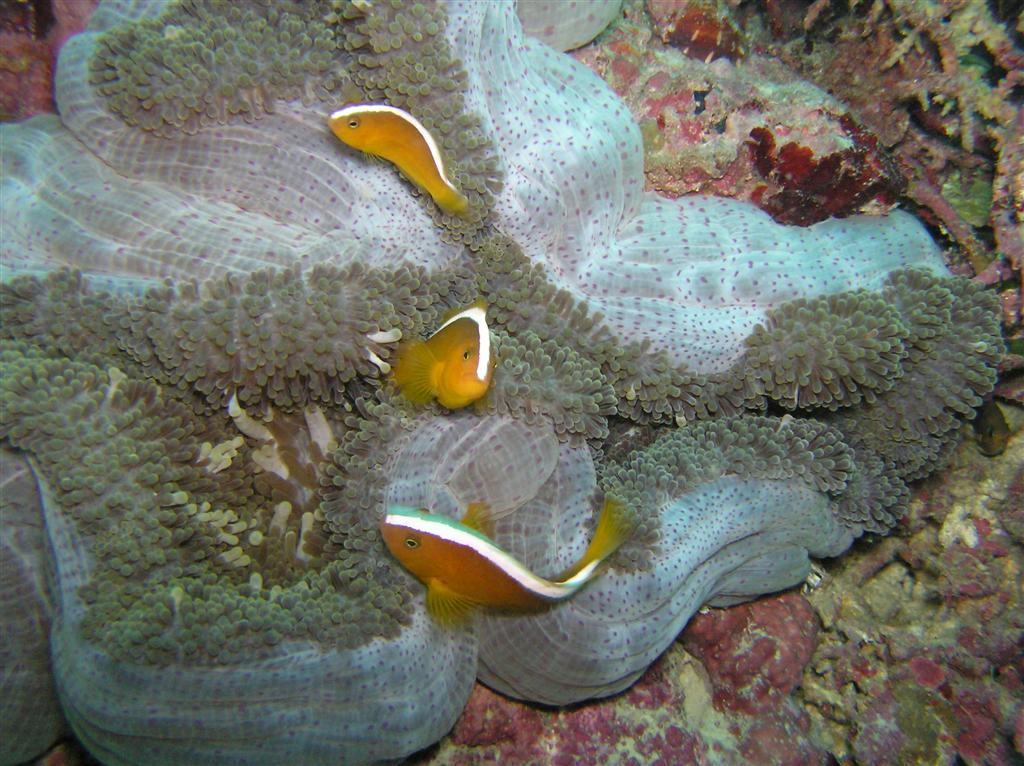
Amphiprion sandaracinos in Stichodactyla mertensii

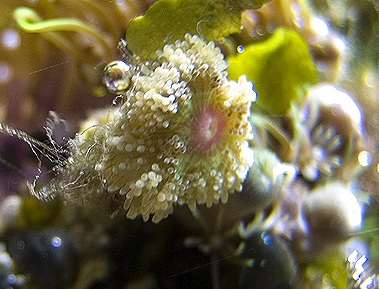
Stichodactyla tapetum

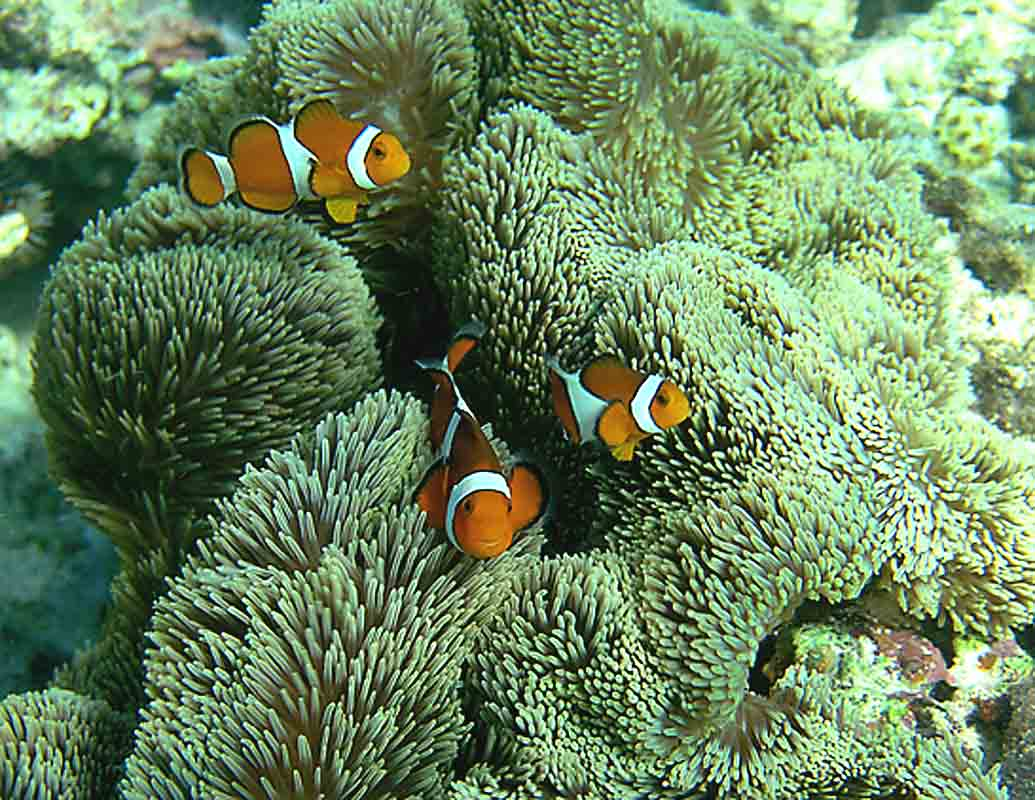
Stichodactyla gigantea

Stichodactyla is a genus of sea anemones, of the family Stichodactylidae. They are host anemones, which maintain a relationship mutualistic with other animals, in their case with crabs of the genus Mithraculus, shrimp of the genus Periclimenes , and with various species of clownfish, of the genus Amphiprion, establishing a relationship of coexistence. In this way, crabs and fish protect themselves from their predators between the stinging tentacles of the anemone, and the anemone benefits from the cleaning of its oral disc and tentacles as a result of the continuous movements of the animals.

== Species ==
The World Register of Marine Species accepts the following species:

- Stichodactyla gigantea (Forskål, 1775)
- Stichodactyla haddoni (Saville-Kent, 1893)
- Stichodactyla helianthus (Ellis, 1768)
- Stichodactyla mertensii (Brandt, 1835)
- Stichodactyla tapetum (Hemprich & Ehrenberg in Ehrenberg, 1834)
