= Picasso clownfish =

Tropical marine fish

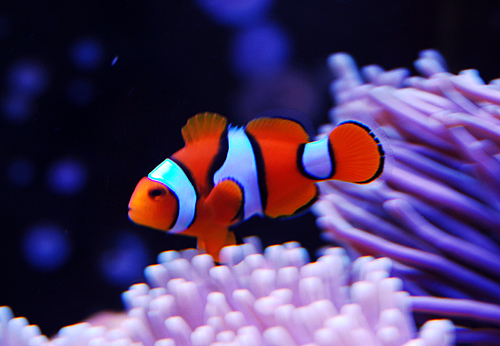
Amphiprion percula

The Picasso clownfish is a genetically variant tropical marine fish of the Amphiprion percula species. This fish has been bred over time to produce a color pattern that is very different from the original. They have been raised to allow the stripes to form irregular patterns. These variations are rare in each batch of eggs and therefore demand a premium price.

Some of these fish have such a pattern that they are entirely covered in white and are called Platinums.

Snowcasso® is a registered trademark belonging to a breeder that raises mostly white A. percula clownfish with dark patterns throughout (not solid white like the Platinums).
