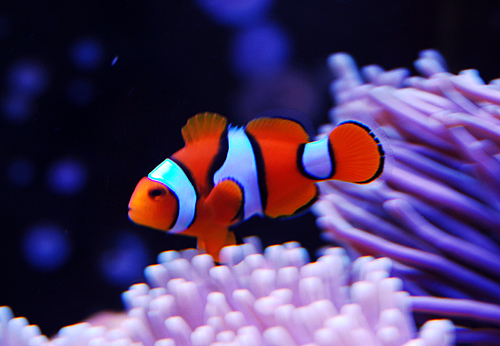

Conservation status
- Least Concern (IUCN 3.1)

Scientific classification
- Kingdom: Animalia
- Phylum: Chordata
- Class: Actinopterygii
- Division: Teleostei
- Order: Blenniiformes
- Family: Pomacentridae
- Genus: Amphiprion
- Species: A. percula

Binomial name
- Amphiprion percula (Lacépède, 1802)

Synonyms
- Lutjanus percula Lacépède, 1802; Actinicola percula (Lacépède, 1802); Amphiprion tunicatus Cuvier, 1830

= Orange clownfish =

Species of fish

The orange clownfish (Amphiprion percula) also known as percula clownfish and clown anemonefish, is widely known as a popular aquarium fish. Like other clownfishes (also known as anemonefishes), it often lives in association with sea anemones. A. percula is associated specifically with Heteractis magnifica and Stichodactyla gigantea, and as larvae use chemical cues released from the anemones to identify and locate the appropriate host species to use them for shelter and protection. This causes preferential selection when finding their anemone host species.

Although popular, maintaining this species in captivity is rather complex. The Great Barrier Reef Marine Park Authority regulates the number of collection permits issued to aquarium fish dealers who seek this, and other tropical fish within the Great Barrier Reef Marine Park.

The symbiosis between anemonefish and anemones depends on the presence of the fish drawing other fish to the anemone, where they are stung by its venomous tentacles. The anemone helps the fish by giving it protection from predators, which include brittle stars, wrasses, and other damselfish, and the fish helps the anemone by feeding it, increasing oxygenation, and removing waste material from the host.

Various hypotheses exist about the fish's ability to live within the anemone without being harmed. One study carried out at Marineland of the Pacific by Dr. Demorest Davenport and Dr. Kenneth Noris in 1958 revealed that the mucus secreted by the anemone fish prevented the anemone from discharging its lethal stinging nematocysts. A second hypothesis is that A. percula has acquired immunity towards the sea anemone's toxins, and a combination of the two has been shown to be the case. The fish feed on algae, zooplankton, worms, and small crustaceans.

== Description ==
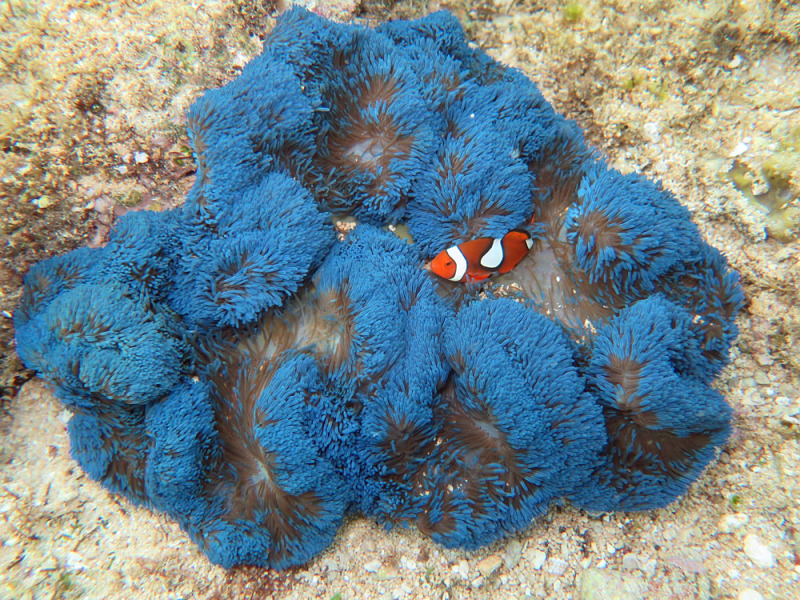
With Stichodactyla gigantea, at Lizard Island, Queensland

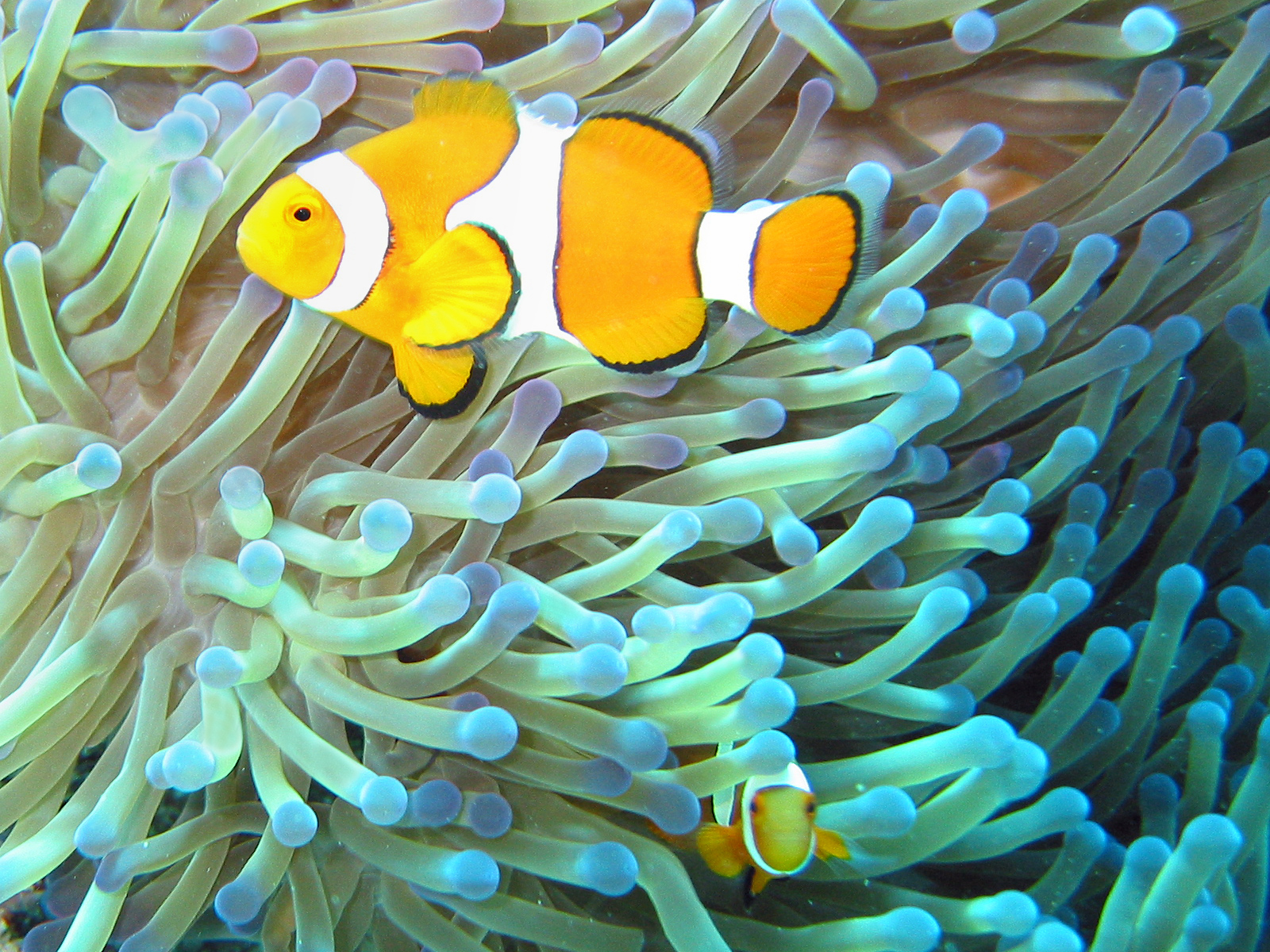
At the Great Barrier Reef

Amphiprion percula can grow to be 11 cm (4.3 in) in length, but is on average 8 cm (3.1 in), and can be recognized by three white lines across their bright orange bodies, with no distinction in color between sexes. The anterior white bar is placed just behind the eye, the middle bar goes straight down the middle of the fish, and the posterior bar occurs near the caudal fin. An anterior projecting bulge also exists on the middle bar. In addition to the white coloring, black edging outlines each fin with varying thickness.

This species can be mistaken for the similar species of clownfishes, A. ocellaris. This is known as the ocellaris clownfish and sometimes referred to as the "false percula clownfish" or "common clownfish" due to its similar color and pattern. The "easiest" way to distinguish the two species is the fact that A. percula has 10 spines in the first dorsal fin (rarely having 9) and A. ocellaris has 11 (rarely 10), which is a more reliable distinction than color patterns. A. ocellaris does not have thick black edging outlining the fins.

Marine heatwaves are known for negatively effecting the growth patterns of species of vertebrates. To combat the heat stress, Orange clownfish are able to shrink their bodies. The amount they shrink is modulated by their social rank and size with individuals that shrink more often than others with their breeding partner have a higher chance of survival during heatwaves.

== Reproduction ==
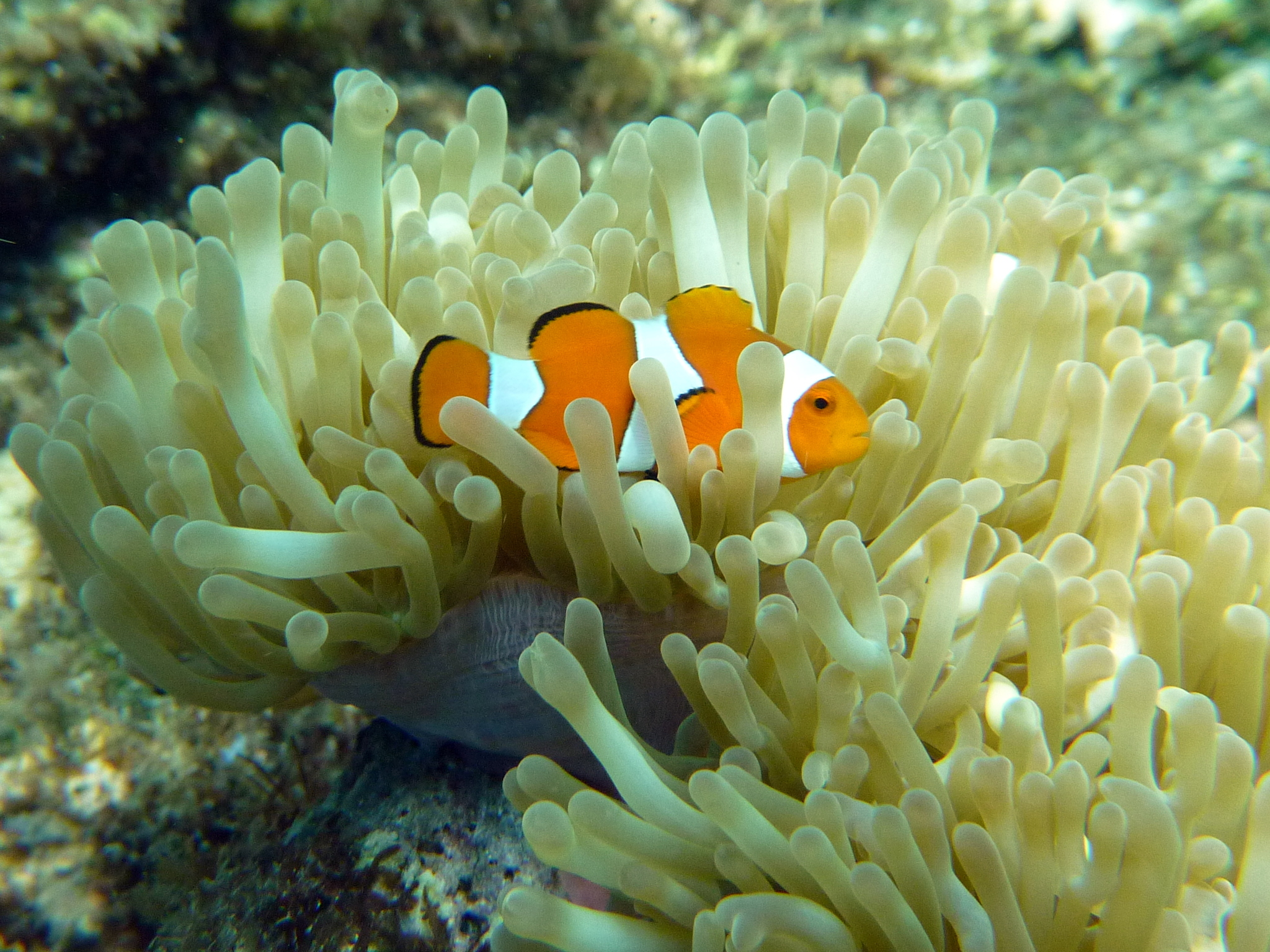
In Papua New Guinea

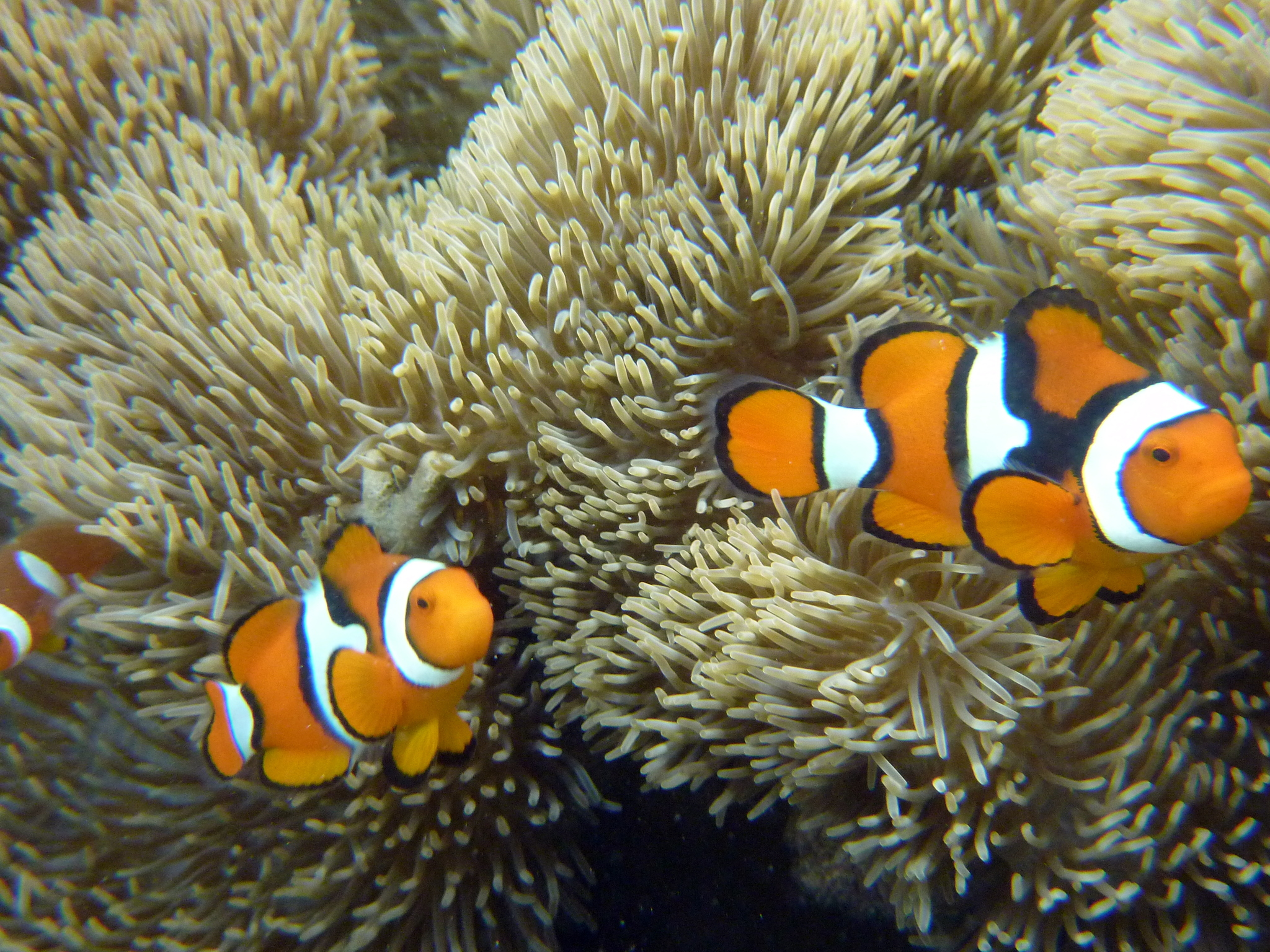
In the Solomon Islands

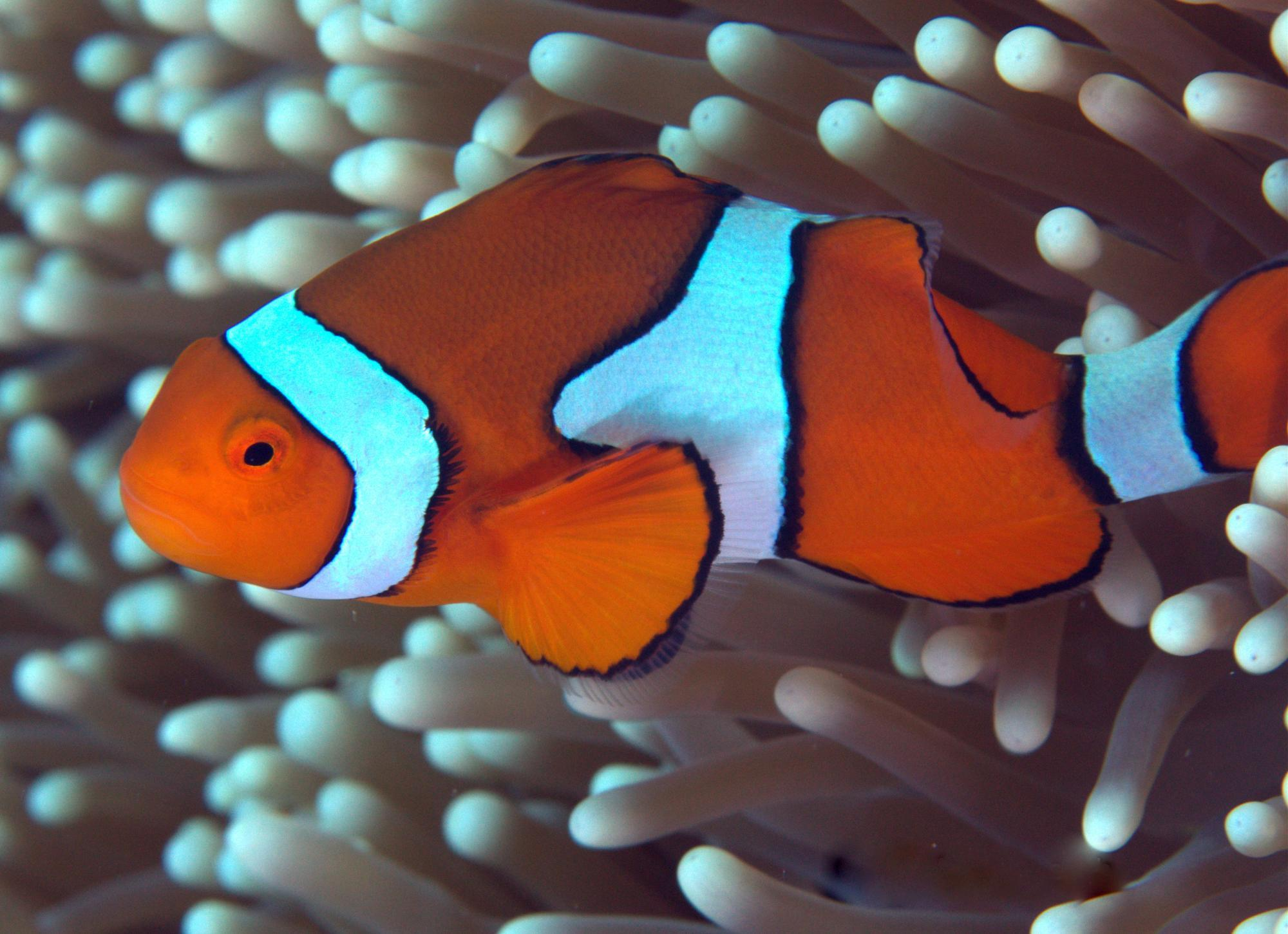
In Queensland

Since these fish live in a warm-water environment, they can reproduce all year long. Each group of fish consists of a breeding pair and none to four nonbreeders. Within each group there is a size-based hierarchy: the female is largest, the breeding male is second largest, and the male non-breeders get progressively smaller as the hierarchy descends. They exhibit protandry, meaning each fish is born male, but changes to female if the sole breeding female dies. If the female dies, the breeding male becomes the breeding female, and the largest nonbreeder becomes the breeding male.

The spawning process is correlated with the lunar cycle. At night time the moon maintains a higher level of alertness in A. percula and this increases the interaction with the males and females. Before spawning, the male attracts the female via courting behaviour. These courting actions include extending their fins, biting the female and chasing her. The males also swim rapidly in an upward and downward motion to attract the females. The nest site is also important for the survival of the eggs. Depending on her size, the female spawns about 400–1500 eggs per cycle. The expected tenure of breeding females is roughly 12 years and is relatively long for a fish of its size, but is characteristic of other reef fish.

Why the nonbreeders continue to associate with these groups has been unclear. Unlike nonreproductives in some animal groups, they cannot obtain occasional breeding opportunities, because their gonads are not functional. They cannot be regarded as helpers at the nest, since their presence does not increase the reproductive success of the breeders. Recent research suggests that they are simply queuing for the territory occupied by the breeders, i.e. the anemone; nonbreeders living in association with breeders have a better chance of eventually securing a territory than a nonresident. The probability of a fish ascending in rank in this queue is equal to that of the individual outliving at least one of its dominants because an individual ascends in rank if any one of its dominants dies, and not simply when its immediate dominant dies.

The development of the fish from juvenile to adult is dependent on the system of hierarchy, and can be described as density-dependent. Aggression is involved in these small families, although usually not between the male and the female. The aggression usually exists between the males. The largest male suppresses the development of the next smallest male, and the cycle continues until the smallest fish is evicted from the host anemone. Within each anemone, the regulation of the species is controlled by the female, since the amount of space for fish in her anemone is directly proportional to her size (which eventually reaches a maximum), so she ultimately controls the size of the other fish. A. percula is a very competitive fish and this causes the smaller fish to have stunted growth. A potential exists for a fish to ascend in rank by contesting its dominant. This depends on the relative body sizes of the two fish, and is very unlikely to happen since A. percula maintains well-defined size differences between individuals adjacent in rank. However, in an aquarium, this fish is peaceful, and it can live in an aquarium environment well.

The fish lay their eggs in a safe spot close to the anemone from where they are easily protected, and the parents can retreat to safety if danger threatens. Anemonefish usually lay their nests in the evening after a few days of carefully cleaning and examining the chosen site. Preferred egg sites are flat or slightly curved rocks or some other item the fish have dragged near their nest for the purpose. (In captivity, clay pots and saucers are an attractive choice.)

First, the female deposits some eggs with her ovipositor (a whitish tube descending from her belly), making a wiggling pass over the surface, then the male follows behind her, fertilizing the eggs. After many passes, the nest is complete and will hatch in 6–8 days shortly after sunset, usually on a very dark night. In the meantime, the male is very protective of the nest and ceaselessly fans the eggs to provide proper oxygen circulation, and checks them for any bad eggs, which he eats before they can rot and damage more eggs. Females may help the male tend the nest.

At hatching, the larvae burst free and swim up toward the moonlight and the open ocean to ride the currents and eat plankton for about a week, before the still tiny metamorphosed clowns return to the reef and look for an anemone in which to settle. Eventually, the cycle repeats.

== Recruitment ==
Recruitment is the number of individuals in a given species that can survive within a certain amount of time following larval habitation. The higher the level of recruitment, the better chance a larva has of surviving long enough to become an adult fish. Large food supplies, low predator threats, and the availability of nearby anemones are all factors that affect their recruitment levels.

A. percula, like most coral reef fish, has a bipartite lifecycle, which has a scattering pelagic larval stage, whereas its resident phase is motionless. At the end of the pelagic phase, the larvae begin to settle on the coral reef and begin their recruiting process in the resident population. Larvae that settle successfully and join a resident population are called recruits. Anemonefish species are recruited to areas where the fish are commonly found.

Most anemonefish are site-attached and do not move from one anemone to another that are spatially distributed more than a few meters. This is simply because it is always a dangerous undertaking for A. percula to be outside its anemonefish safe haven, exposed to dangerous predators. They are also very poor swimmers, increasing the risk involved in travel.

Recruitment is essentially the only method that the fish can use to inhabit new anemones. Finding a better living situation in a different anemone is unlikely because every anemone is already occupied by other anemonefish species. Anemonefish are known for reproducing all year round when they are in lower latitudes and recruitment with these fish is anticipated to follow the same pattern.

== Habitat ==
Anemonefish are specialized coral reef fish that live within host anemones and are found in warmer waters in the Pacific and Indian Oceans, off northwest Australia, southeast Asia, and Japan.

Both A. percula and the anemones reside in shallow waters and the depth usually does not exceed 12 m with water temperatures ranging between 25 and 28 °C. Host anemones, which are tube-like organisms that reside on coral reefs, are usually occupied by only one anemonefish species because one species outcompetes and exclude other species when they inhabit the same host anemone. Unless a significant size difference exists, two anemonefish species show aggression towards each other when trying to occupy the same host anemone. This is why the supply of nearby anemone hosts so strongly influences A. percula's ability to achieve recruitment and survival in general.

A primary host anemone has an anemonefish at a high frequency and a secondary host anemone has one at a relatively low frequency. The distribution and availability of sea anemones is limited by the activity of photosynthesis of algae that occupy the anemones' tentacles. Secondary hosts are usually only used if a severe lack of available primary hosts exists. When many different species of anemonefishes occupy similar habitats, they tend to spread themselves out according to smaller microhabitats and available species of anemones. A. percula and A. perideraion both essentially live within the H. magnifica anemone, but A. percula has the highest selection ratios with the S. gigantea. A study done by Elliot & Mariscal in the region of Madang, Papua New Guinea found that all of the H. magnifica anemones that were censused were occupied by A. percula and A. perideraion.

A. percula generally occupies anemones that are near shore, while A. perideraion occupies anemones that are more offshore. Anemonefish do not occupy anemones if they are in shallow water or if they are too small. Shallow waters are not an inhabitable environment for A. percula because of the lower salinity levels, increased temperatures, and exposure during low tides. Also, small anemones would not provide protection from predators.

A. percula and the host anemone are very important to one another and interact in a symbiotic relationship. A. percula cleans the host anemone by consuming algae residue and zooplankton such as copepods and larval tunicates. They also protect the anemone from polyp-consuming fish and other predators, while the clownfish is protected from predators by the anemone. A. percula sometimes carries pieces of food to the host anemone for later consumption. In most cases the host anemone then devours the food that A. percula stored around it. Chances of survival for both parties involved are increased through this co-existence.

The larvae of orange clownfish use olfaction to avoid predators, and increased ocean acidification may cause larvae to be unable to differentiate predators from other odors. This could allow them to be preyed upon more easily, and lead to higher population mortality rates. Impairment of larval olfaction may also make them less able to locate appropriate reef habitats at the higher levels of ocean acidification that are projected to occur with increased carbon dioxide emissions. A paper published in Nature in 2020 cast doubt on the effect of acidification, stating "our findings indicate that the reported effects of ocean acidification on the behaviour of coral reef fishes are not reproducible, suggesting that behavioural perturbations will not be a major consequence for coral reef fishes in high CO2 oceans". A meta-analysis published in 2022 also found that effect sizes of studies assessing ocean acidification effects on fish behaviour have declined dramatically over a decade of research on this topic, with effects appearing negligible since 2015, representing one of the most extreme examples of the decline effect in ecology.

== Development ==
The development of A. percula is relatively fast. After the eggs are fertilized, they are ready to hatch after about 6–7 days. After hatching, the larvae are very small and are transparent except for the eyes, yolk sac, and a few colors across the body. The larvae then sink to the benthic environment, but then swim to the upper water column. The larvae spend about a week floating among plankton and are transported by ocean currents. The larval stage ends when A. percula settles to the bottom of the ocean. The process from larval stage to juvenile takes about one day.

Rapid development of color occurs during A. percula's juvenile stage. During the juvenile stage the anemonefish has to find a suitable anemone host. Specific chemical components are used when finding their host. These chemical cues are different for each anemonefish. This causes preferential selection when finding their anemone host species. When A. percula comes in contact with the anemone, it produces a protective mucous coat. This mucous coat is developed with multiple interactions with the host anemone. A. percula dances around the anemone, touching its fins first to the tentacles and then its entire body during its first interaction with the anemone. This process could take a few minutes or up to several hours. If A. percula does not continue to come in contact with the host anemone, the protective mucus may disappear. A. percula belongs to a group of fishes that are not stung by the nematocysts of the anemone. If A. percula did not have the protective mucous covering, it would be stung. Other fish species that lack the mucous covering are consumed by the anemone.

== See also ==
- Picasso clownfish
