= Sunflower (2023 film) =

2023 Australian coming-of-age film

- Theatrical film poster
- Directed by: Gabriel Carrubba
- Written by: Gabriel Carrubba
- Produced by: Zane Borg; Gabriel Carrubba
- Starring: Liam Mollica; Luke J. Morgan; Olivia Fildes; Daniel Halmarick; Elias Anton
- Cinematography: Martine Wolff
- Edited by: Shannon Michaelas
- Music by: Marlon Grunden
- Release dates: 15 June 2023 (Sydney); 4 July 2024 (Australia)
- Running time: 84 mins.
- Country: Australia
- Language: English

Sunflower is a 2023 Australian coming-of-age LGBTQ+ drama film, directed and written by Gabriel Carrubba in his debut. The film stars Liam Mollica, Daniel Halmarick, Luke J. Morgan, Olivia Fildes, and Elias Anton. It premiered at Sydney Film Festival in 2023, before its limited release throughout Australia in 2024.

== Synopsis ==
A seventeen-year-old boy struggles to understand and embrace his sexuality as he comes of age in the working class suburbs on Melbourne's edge.

== Cast ==
- Liam Mollica as Leo
- Luke J. Morgan as Boof
- Olivia Fildes as Monique
- Daniel Halmarick as Tom
- Diana Ferreira as Rosa
- Sal Galofaro as Frank
- Mia Barrett as Carly
- Uisce Goriss-Dazeley as Pickles
- Nelson Blattman as Gianni
- Dylan Laguerre as Tony
- Mark Muo as Remi
- Jacob Pontil-Scala as Cam
- Elias Anton as Derek

== Reception ==
Nathan Phillis of Pulp lauded the film for being "a perfect touchstone for, and a masterful hallmark of, modern queer film". Matthew Toomey of The Film Pie stated that "star Liam Mollica has a likable screen presence". Michelle Vorob of Bain's Film Reviews praised it for being "a heartfelt and powerful coming-of-age film...that also happens to be a coming-out film". However, Joel Keith of Rough Cut derided the film for "sacrificing too much in its pursuit of acceptance".
