= Sunflower Corporation =

- Company type: Private
- Industry: Daylighting/Lighting, Renewable energy
- Founded: 2004
- Founder: Dr. Larry Kinney, Jim Walsh, John Hutson, Gary Cler, Dr. Ross McCluney
- Headquarters: Boulder, Colorado, U.S.
- Key people: Peter Novak (CEO); Jim Walsh (President)
- Products: Daylighting systems
- Website: www.sundolier.com

Sunflower Corporation (Daylighting) is a start-up company founded in 2004 and based in Boulder Colorado, USA. Sunflower develops natural daylighting technology for use in commercial spaces.

The company focuses on active daylighting systems (as opposed to passive daylighting systems), which give these systems the ability to make greater use of available daylight for a longer period of time throughout the day.

== New technology and interest ==
Sunflower Corporation was the recipient of a $25,000 grant from the Governor's Energy Office of Colorado, to bring its product, a "system that harvests sunlight and delivers it into interior spaces" to Colorado schools. Their patent pending technology is being considered by the state to be a 'key component' for a 'new push' in high-performance buildings.

- Their daylighting technology lights an 800–8,000 sf room with a single 24 inch roof penetration for most of the day.
- Their system uses a new active daylighting technology that is the only one of its kind on the market that will outperform skylights and light tubes by a factor of 4 or more.

== Community Support ==
Sunflower Corporation has been active in supporting various public organizations in Colorado. The company has donated a number of Sundolier units to local schools, including a unit given to Longmont High School in Longmont, CO. Additionally a unit was donated to the Phillip S. Miller Library in Douglas County, Colorado.

== See also ==
- Daylighting
- Active daylighting
- Green technology
- Renewable energy
- Solar power
