= The Sunflower (Țuculescu) =

1954 painting by Ion Țuculescu

- Floarea Soarelui (Romanian)
- Artist: Ion Țuculescu
- Year: 1954
- Medium: oil on canvas
- Dimensions: 47 cm × 55 cm (19 in × 22 in)
- Location: National Museum of Art of Romania, Bucharest

Sunflower (Romanian: Floarea Soarelui) is a painting by Romanian artist Ion Țuculescu from 1954.

== Description ==
The picture is painted in oil on canvas and has dimensions of 47 x 55 centimeters.

The picture is part of the National Museum of Art of Romania in Bucharest.

== Analysis ==
Sunflower is part of the second phase in the work of Ion Țuculescu, covering the period from 1947 to 1956. In this period, his works were influenced by folklore. The use of natural elements and autobiographical references in the context of Romanian art between the two world wars and after the Second World War.

This is one of the most characteristic of his paintings. In the foreground, on the left side, stands a bright yellow sunflower on the background of many others and cloudy sky. The picture is closer to the aesthetics of naive art than Sunflowers by Van Gogh. Sunflower stands with rich bright colors - orange, yellow and red.
