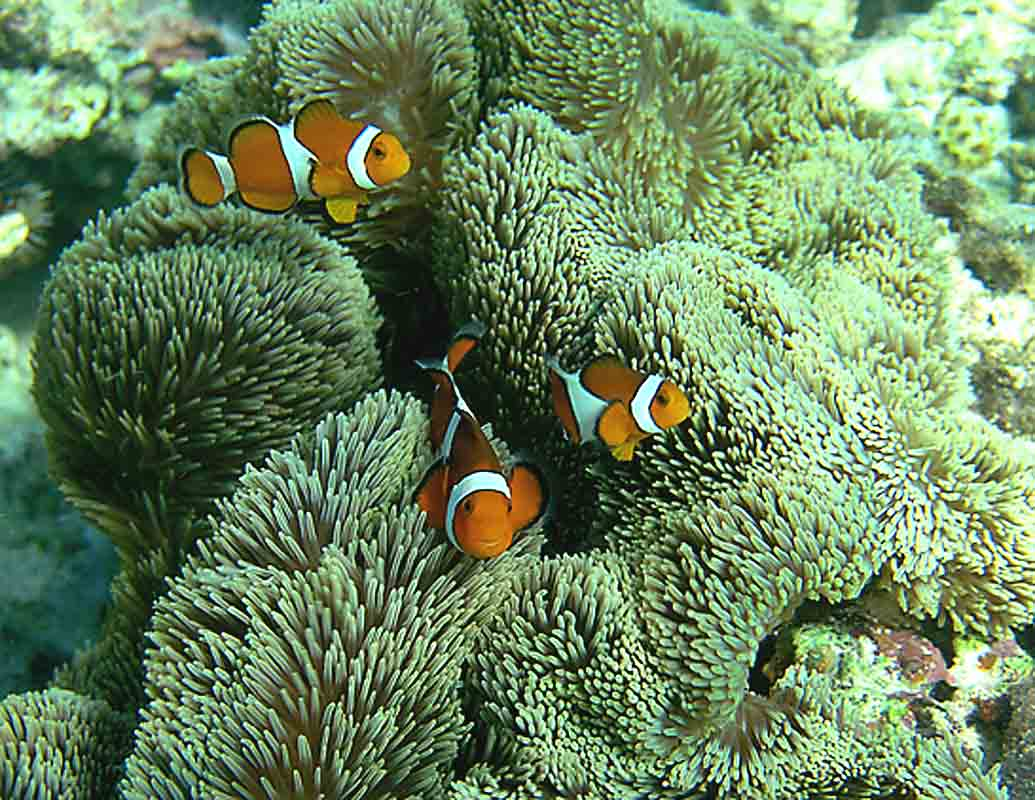
- Stichodactlya gigantea with false percula clownfish, Amphiprion ocellaris

Scientific classification
- Kingdom: Animalia
- Phylum: Cnidaria
- Subphylum: Anthozoa
- Class: Hexacorallia
- Order: Actiniaria
- Family: Stichodactylidae
- Genus: Stichodactyla
- Species: S. gigantea

Binomial name
- Stichodactyla gigantea (Forsskål, 1775)

Synonyms
- List: Actinia amethystina Quoy & Gaimard, 1833; Actinia brevitentacula Quoy & Gaimard; Actinia gigantea (Forskål, 1775); Actinia gigas Renieri; Actinia gygas Renieri; Actinia parvitentaculata Quoy & Gaimard, 1833; Discosoma gigantea; Discosoma giganteum; Discosoma kenti Haddon & Shackleton, 1893; Isacmaea gigantea Hemprich & Ehrenberg; Polyparium ambulans Korotneff, 1886; Priapus giganteus Forsskål, 1775; Radianthus parvitentaculata (Quoy & Gaimard, 1833); Radianthus parvitentaculatus (Quoy & Gaimard, 1833); Stichodactyla kenti (Haddon & Shackleton, 1893); Stoichactis gigantea (Forsskål, 1775); Stoichactis giganteum (Forsskål, 1775); Stoichactis giganteus (Forsskål, 1775); Stoichactis gigantium; Stoichactis intermedia Lager, 1911; Stoichactis kenti Haddon & Shackleton, 1893

= Stichodactyla gigantea =

Species of sea anemone

Stichodactyla gigantea, commonly known as the giant carpet anemone, is a species of sea anemone that lives in the Hawaii, USA, North America, and Indo-Pacific area. It can be kept in an aquarium but is a very challenging species to keep alive and healthy for more than 3–5 years.

== Description ==
Stichodactyla gigantea has a diameter that is usually no larger than 50 centimetres (1.6 ft) and a maximum of 80 centimetres (2.6 ft). It can appear in a number of colors, commonly brown or greenish and rarely a striking purple or pink, deep blue, or bright green. A healthy S. gigantea will possess tentacles that are extremely sticky to the touch, with firm adherence to surfaces.

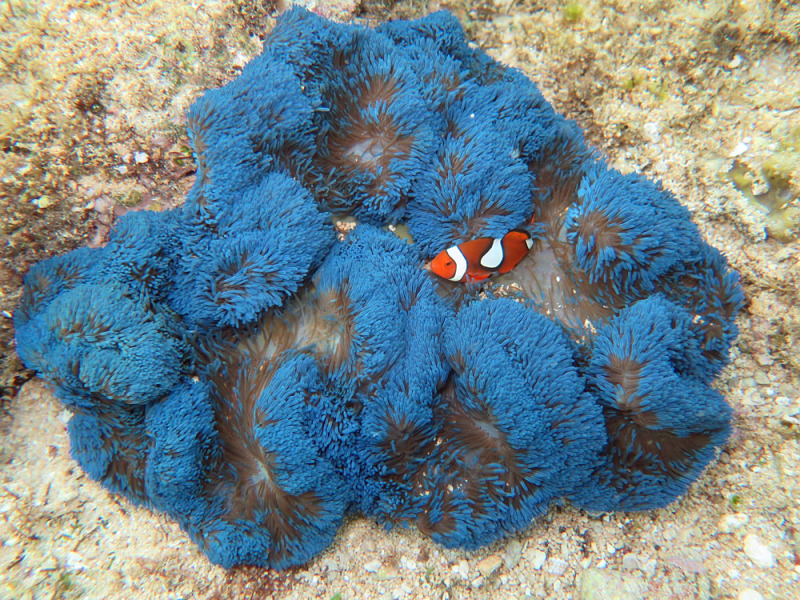
Blue

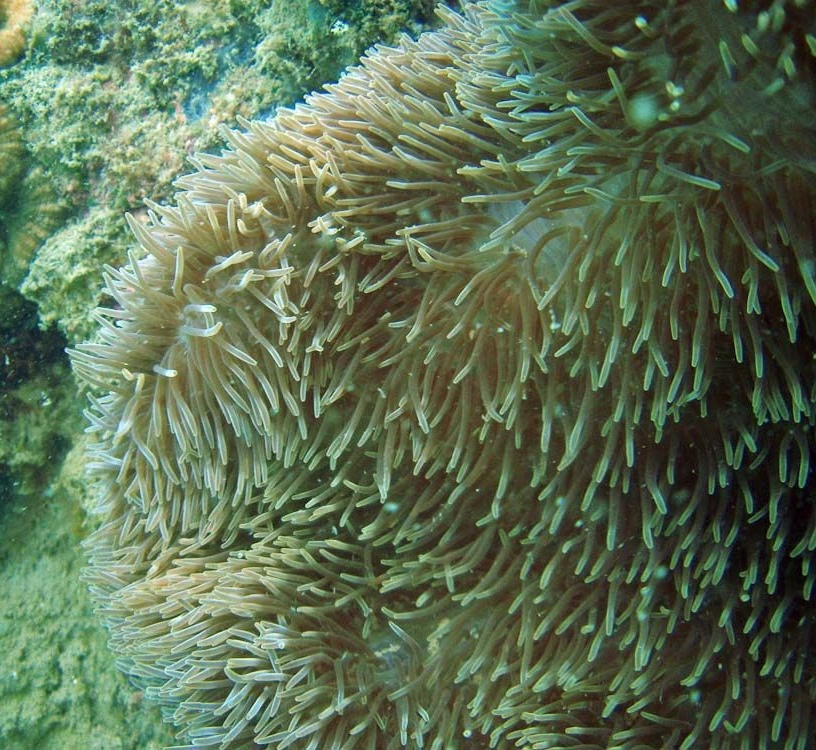
Beige

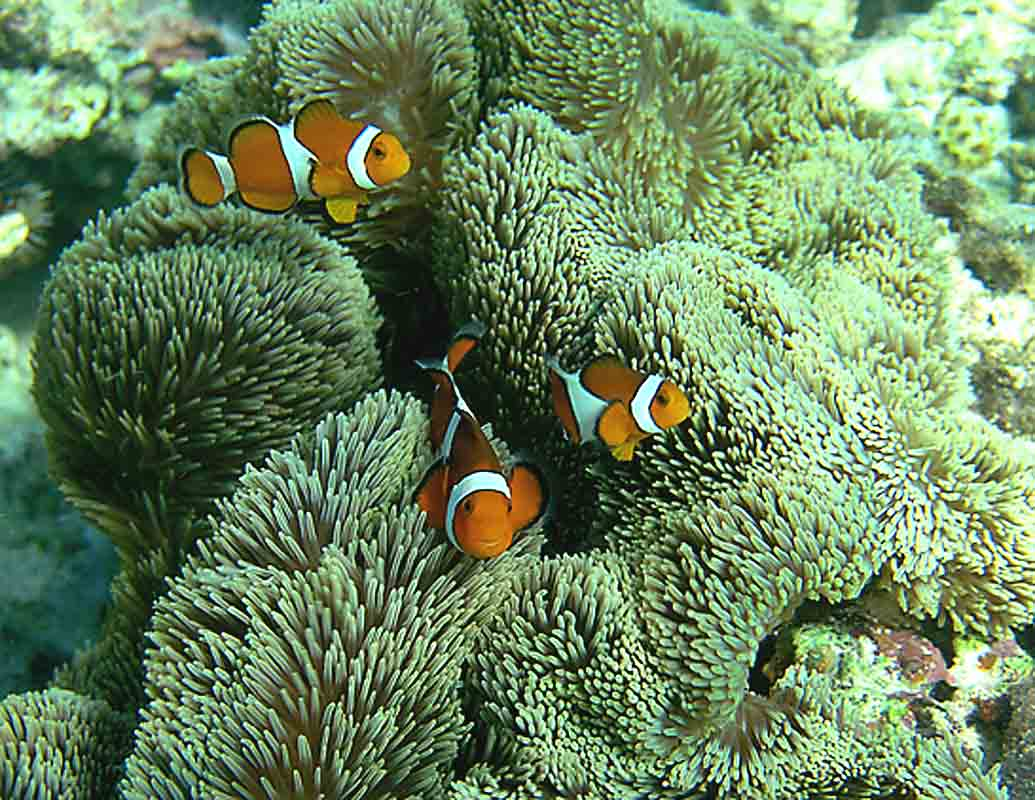
Green

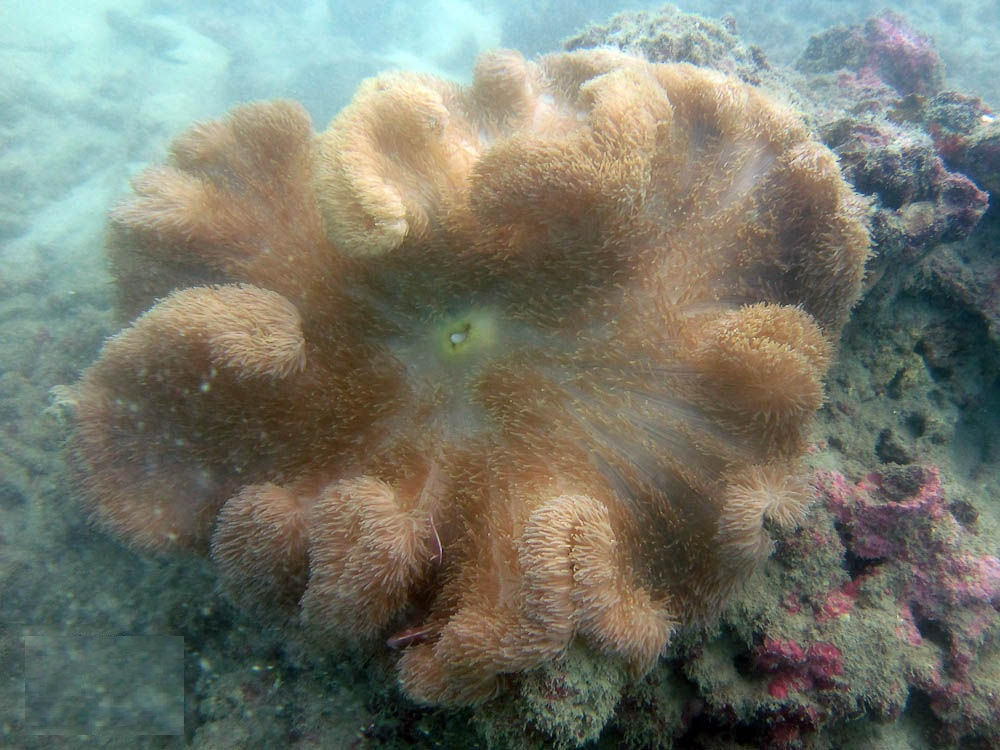
Orange

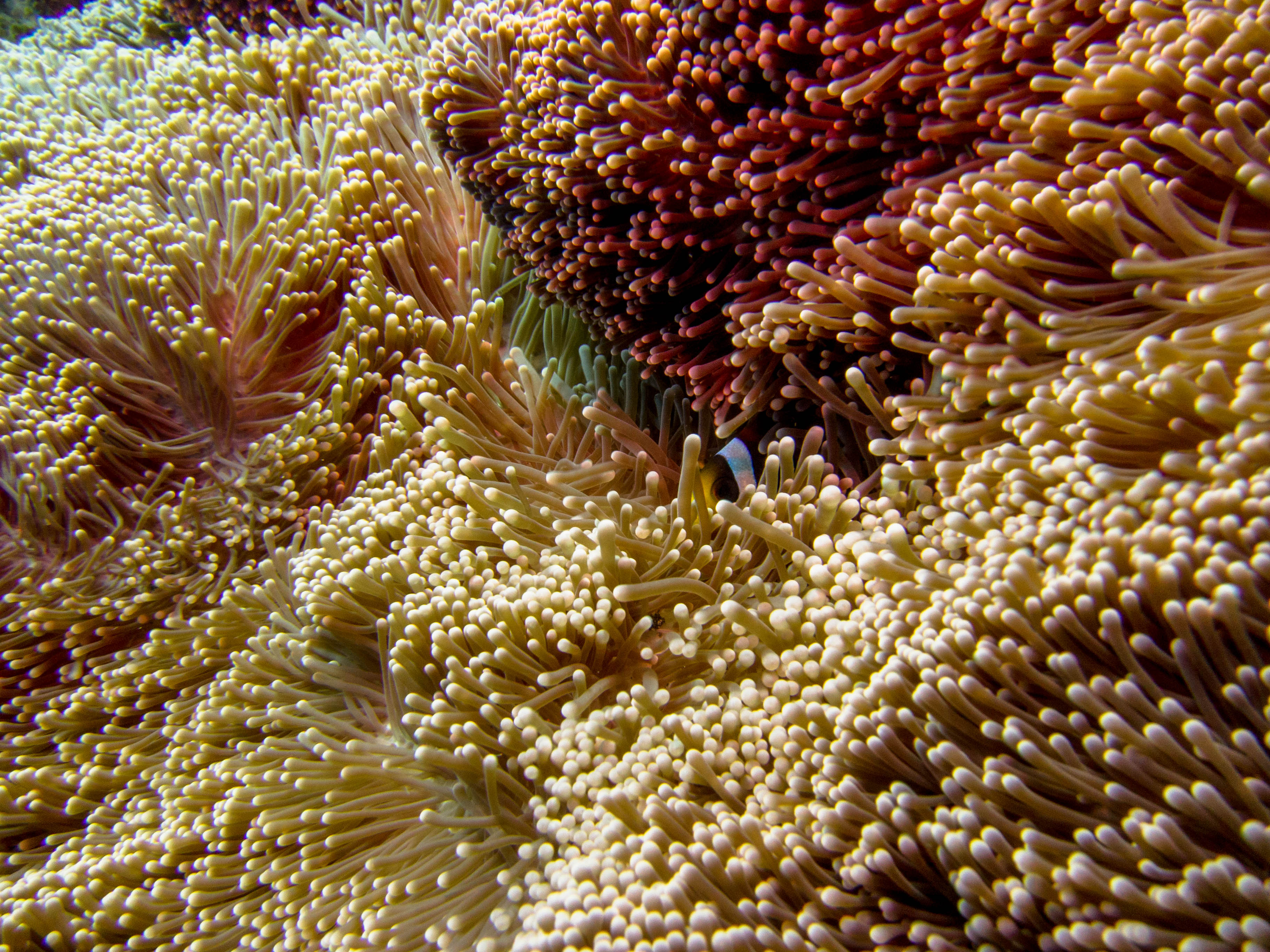
Tan

== Ecology ==
S. gigantea resides on shallow seagrass beds or sand flats around 8 centimetres (3.1 in) deep (at low tide). Most anemones are treated as sessile, but the ones inhabited by anemonefish are in fact motile. Zooxanthellae are obligate symbionts within the anemone.

S. gigantea hosts 7 different species of anemonefish

- Amphiprion akindynos (Barrier reef anemonefish)
- A. bicinctus (Two-band anemonefish)
- A. clarkii (Clark's anemonefish)
- A. ocellaris (False clownfish)
- A. percula (Clownfish)
- A. perideraion (Pink skunk anemonefish)
- A. rubrocinctus (Australian anemonefish)

Juvenile Dascyllus trimaculatus also associate with S. gigantea.

== Aquarium trade ==
S. gigantea is uncommon in the aquarium trade. Though smaller in size than other carpet anemone species, it is significantly more delicate, and requires a large, mature reef aquarium. Like all sea anemones in captivity that have a symbiotic, mutualistic relationship with anemonefish, S. gigantea requires intense aquarium lighting, impeccable water quality, and stable parameters. It is prone to shipping stress and bacterial infections during transit. Due to these factors, many hobbyists advocate quarantining this anemone and treating with antibiotics such as Ciprofloxacin or Septra for a minimum of one week before acclimating it to the main tank.
