= Sunflower Farmers Market =

Former American grocery store chain

- Company type: Private
- Founded: 2002
- Headquarters: Boulder, CO, U.S. and Phoenix, AZ, U.S.
- Number of locations: 35
- Area served: Arizona, California, Colorado, Nevada, New Mexico, Oklahoma, Texas and Utah
- Key people: Chris Sherrell, President & CEOPress Release
- Products: Food, natural food, organic food, frozen foods, grocery items, private-label items, natural living, bath and body care items, vitamins and supplements
- Website: www.sunflowermarkets.com www.facebook.com/sunflowermkt

Sunflower Farmers Market was an American chain of full-service grocery stores headquartered in Phoenix, Arizona, which emphasized value-priced natural and organic products. Sunflower opened its first store in Albuquerque, New Mexico, in 2002. In June 2013, Sunflower Farmers Market was operating 38 grocery stores located in eight Southwestern states: Arizona, California, Colorado, Nevada, New Mexico, Utah, Oklahoma and Texas (where it formerly operated as Newflower Farmers Market). In June 2012, Sunflower merged with Sprouts Farmers Markets.

== History ==
Libby Cook, founder of Sunflower Farmers Market, had been involved in the natural and organic food business for 25 years. She was President and CEO from 2002 to 2005. In 2006 Mike Gilliland became CEO. He, along with Cook co-founded Wild Oats Markets and together grew the company from a single store in Boulder, Colorado to a billion-dollar publicly traded enterprise with 115 stores throughout the US and Canada.

In 2002, Cook founded Sunflower Farmers Market, which operates natural foods supermarkets throughout the southwestern United States; she served as the company's Chief Executive Officer. until 2006. In 2007, KMCP Advisors invested $30 million (~$43.6 million in 2024) in Convertible Preferred Stock. The Company used the proceeds to fund the opening of new stores. The managers of KMCP Advisors, Timothy Kelleher and Douglas Meltzer, are also the founders of Silver Canyon Group, a private equity firm focused on growth equity based in San Diego, CA. In February 2011, Gilliland resigned after being arrested on felony charges; Chris Sherrell, Sunflower's president at the time, was subsequently named acting CEO. He was appointed permanent CEO three months later. Under the leadership of Sherrel and KMCP Advisors, the Company continued to flourish.

=== Merger ===
In March 2012, Sunflower Farmers Market merged with Sprouts Farmers Market. Tim Kelleher of KMCP Advisors continued his Board role in Sprouts.

== Products ==
Sunflower Farmers Market aims to develop the value segment of the natural and organic foods retailing industry. Sunflower's motto is "Serious Food…Silly Prices." Sunflower offers produce, meat, fish, bulk foods and coffee, deli foods, natural bath and body care items, vitamins and supplements and, in some locations, beer and wine.

Sunflower Farmers Market endeavors to keep prices low by keeping their overhead low, foregoing certain light fixtures and high rents. Sunflower also buys big, purchasing almost everything by the pallet or truckload, and sourcing directly, and paying vendors quickly. They don't charge vendors "slotting allowances" or shelf-space fees, and they negotiate on prices.

=== Green Initiatives ===
- As Sunflower grows, they continue to develop new stores with eco-friendly initiatives in mind, conserving building materials and using techniques that have a friendly impact on the planet.
- Some Sunflower stores offer reserved parking spaces for alternative fuel vehicles, bathrooms equipped with waterless urinals, wind power, refurbished fixtures and a lighting program which is programmed to turn itself down as natural light flows through skylights.
- Sunflower offers over 275 foods in bulk, reducing the amount of plastic packaging used.
- Sunflower encourages the use of re-usable grocery bags in place of paper or plastic bags.
- Sunflower offers a 10 cent discount for every paper, plastic, or cloth bag a customer brings in to bag groceries.
- Every Sunflower store collects and recycles plastic grocery bags.
- Sunflower hosts in-store events benefiting environmentally active, not-for-profit organizations.
- Sunflower uses recycled and refurbished equipment, cases and fixtures whenever possible.
- Sunflower reduces fuel consumption by coordinating trucking in-house, maximizing truck capacities, and ensuring proper tire pressure on all trucks.

== Awards and recognition ==
- Tucson Weekly – Best of Tucson – Best Organic Food Store
- Albuquerque the Magazine – Best of the City – Best Grocery Store
- International Council of Shopping Centers – 2010 Hot Retailers Award
- Best of Burque 2010 – Best Everyday Grocery Store (2nd Place); Best Produce Selection
- Best of Boulder 2010 – Honorable Mention for best Natural Foods Store
- Colorado Springs Independent – Best Natural Foods Store (2nd Place)
- Colorado Daily – CU & Boulder's Best 2010 – Best Grocery (runner up)
- Grocery Headquarters – Natural/Organic Supermarket Retailer of the Year
- Colorado Springs The Gazette – Best of the Springs 2010 – Best Farmers Market (Bronze Winner)
- ColoradoBiz 2010 CEO of the Year Award
- Boulder Chamber of Commerce 2010 Entrepreneur of Distinction Award
