= Sunflower, West Virginia =

Sunflower
- Unincorporated community
- Location within the state of West Virginia Sunflower (the United States)
- Coordinates: 38°54′18″N 81°28′39″W
- Country: United States
- State: West Virginia
- County: Roane
- Elevation: 728 ft (222 m)
- Time zone: UTC-5 (Eastern (EST))
  - Summer (DST): UTC-4 (EDT)
- GNIS ID: 1549946

Sunflower is an unincorporated community in Roane County, West Virginia, United States.
