= Sunflower (cocktail) =

Sour cocktail

- Type: Mixed drink
- Ingredients: 3/4 oz gin; 3/4 oz Cointreau; 3/4 oz elderflower liqueur; 3/4 oz lemon juice; Absinthe (for rinse)
- Base spirit: Gin
- Standard drinkware: Champagne coupe
- Standard garnish: Lemon peel
- Preparation: Rinse glass with absinthe and chill. Combine ingredients with ice in cocktail shaker; shake well, then strain into cocktail glass, pouring over ice.

The Sunflower is a sour cocktail made with equal parts gin, elderflower liqueur, orange liqueur like Cointreau, and fresh lemon juice. It's served in a coupe glass that has been "rinsed" with absinthe. It is similar to the Corpse Reviver No. 2.
