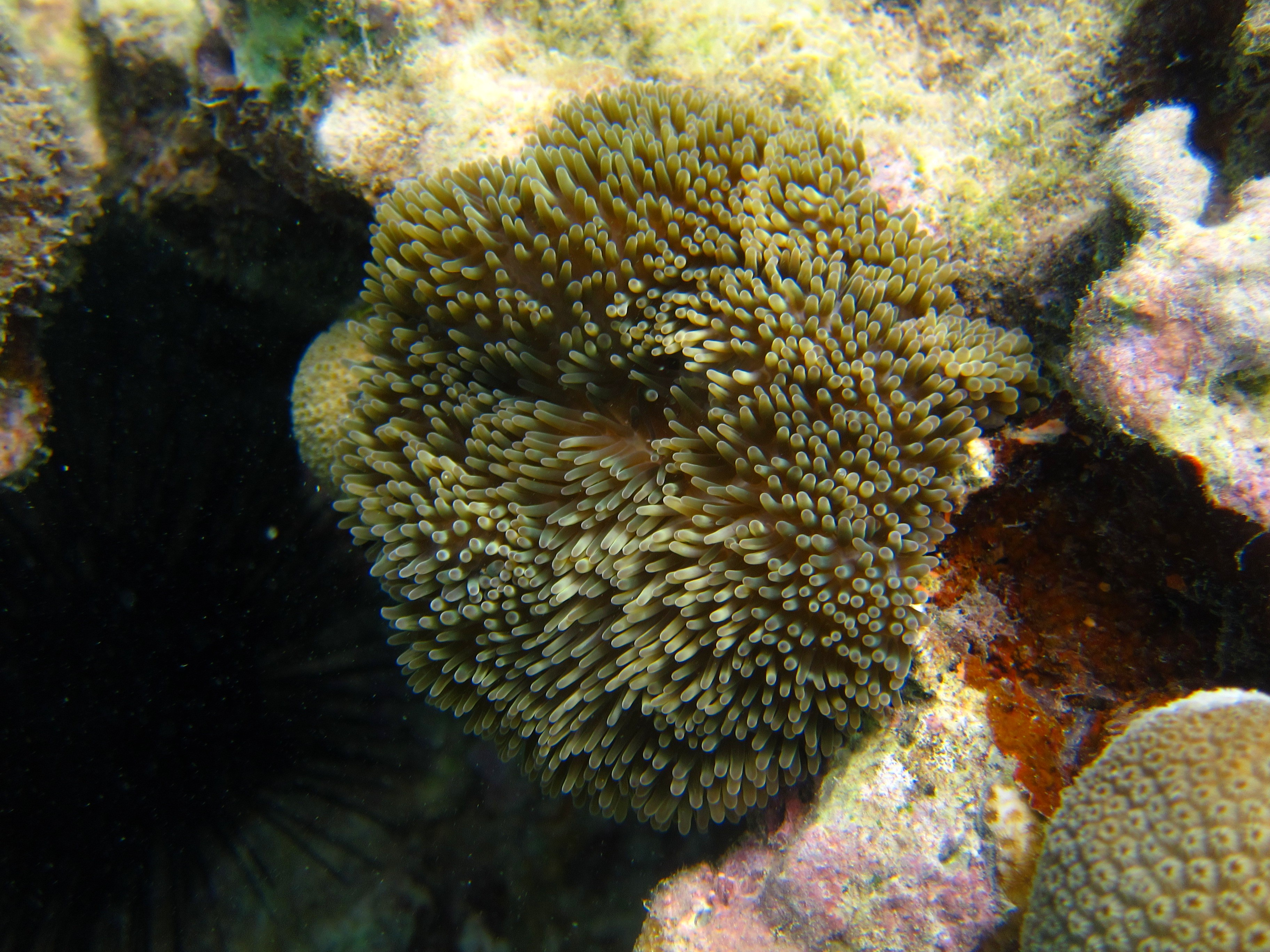
- Stichodactyla helianthus on Culebra Island, Puerto Rico

Conservation status
- Vulnerable (NatureServe)

Scientific classification
- Kingdom: Animalia
- Phylum: Cnidaria
- Subphylum: Anthozoa
- Class: Hexacorallia
- Order: Actiniaria
- Family: Stichodactylidae
- Genus: Stichodactyla
- Species: S. helianthus

Binomial name
- Stichodactyla helianthus Ellis, 1768

= Stichodactyla helianthus =

Species of sea anemone

Stichodactyla helianthus, commonly known as sun anemone, is a sea anemone of the family Stichodactylidae. Helianthus stems from the Greek words ἡλιος (meaning sun), and ἀνθος, meaning flower. S. helianthus is a large, green, sessile, carpet-like sea anemone, from the Caribbean. It lives in shallow areas with mild to strong currents.

== General characteristics ==
Stichodactyla helianthus is a tropical anemone commonly known as the “Sun Anemone” and part of the order Actiniaria, which comprises the sea anemones of the class Anthozoa. Described posthumously by John Ellis in 1786, these organisms, like all Anthozoa, are documented by the absence of an operculum–a calcareous shell in a circular form. Anthozoans also possess circular mitochondrial DNA and siphonoglyphs (ciliated grooves) in the pharyngeal wall. Another predominant trait resides in the presence of the coelenteron around the centralized body cavity, which is divided by distinct septa. In terms of reproductive distinction, this species lacks a medusa stage and exhibits the polyp stage exclusively.

== Morphology ==
These organisms specifically reside in the family Stichodactylidae or the “carpet anemones”. Defined by their distinct morphology, S. helianthus are large anemones that are sessile and range in diameter of 10–20 cm. Their color varies in shades of golden brown, yellow and green. They possess a multitude of nematocyst-coated tentacles that cover their flattened oral disc. The nematocysts play a large role in predation and defense by excreting toxins.

== Distribution and habitat ==
Sun anemones are marine organisms that are distributed in shallow areas of the sea floor, typically at depths from 1–10 m. This species is epibenthic. Commonly called the Caribbean Sun Anemone, S. helianthus are predominantly found in the Caribbean and Western Atlantic Seas. Additionally, they have been discovered along the coast of the United States, Canada, Costa Rica and Belize.

S. helianthus may live singularly, but commonly live in dense aggregations such as in reef formations.

== Symbiosis ==
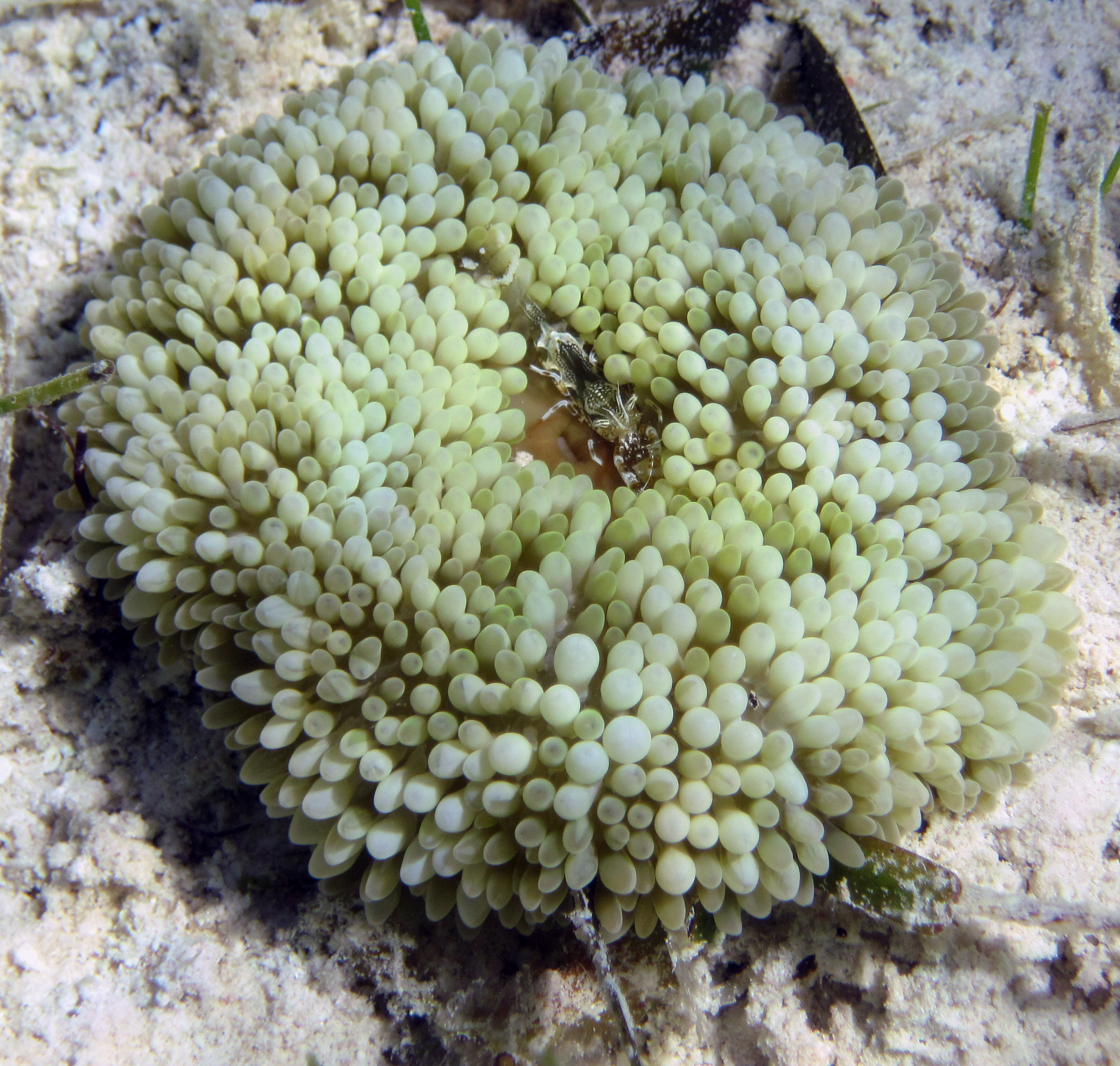
Periclimenes rathbunae in S. helianthus, San Salvador Island, Bahamas

Like many other anemones, S. helianthus can serve as a “hub” for mutualistic networks of species and has been documented to live in symbiosis with other organisms. Symbiosis refers to the close association between organisms of two different species, whereas at least one organism benefits.

These symbiont organisms vary substantially and can include algal endosymbionts, such as zooxanthellae, anemone crabs and anemone shrimp. In specific, Symbiodinium spp. is zooxanthellae that has been investigated to establish complex relationships with sun anemones, even to the extent of coordinating cell cycles with hosts. Another endosymbiont is the Clibanarius tricolor, or the blue-legged hermit crab, which has been recorded to live in symbiosis in the Caribbean and Indo-Pacific Regions. This crab uses the surface of the anemone as a “microhabitat” and is protected from the anemone's harmful toxins by removable coverings on the surface of their bodies. Another largely-studied endosymbiont is the anemone shrimp. Hayes et al. reported cohabitation of sun anemones by Periclimenes rathbunae, also called sun anemone shrimp, in a random manner that may be directly influenced by anemone size in the West Indies. In a further study, Periclimenes yucatanicus, or spotted cleaner shrimp, were additionally observed in symbiosis with S. helianthus in the Florida Bay.

== Toxin production ==
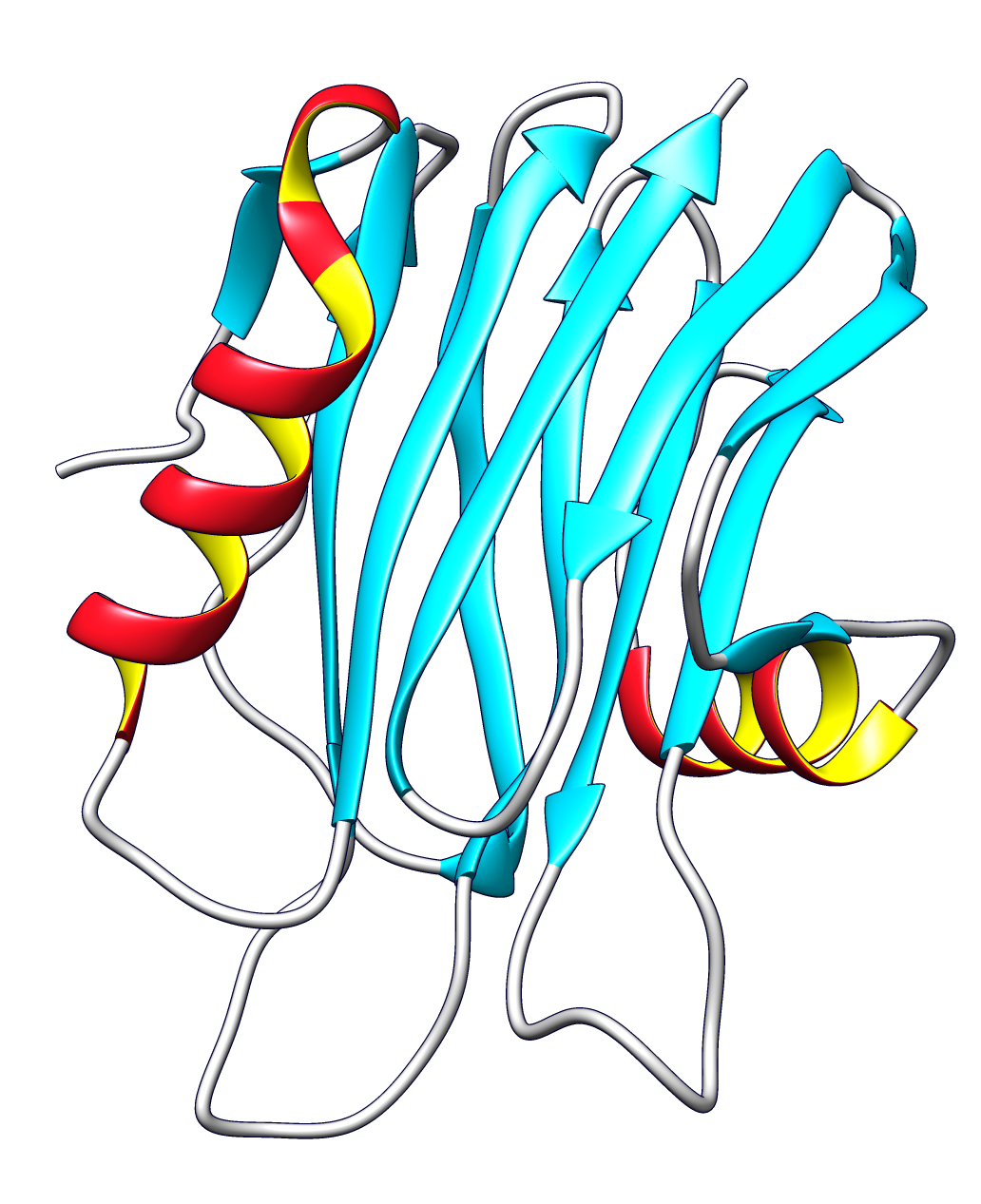
Structure of Sticholysin II

Like many other sea anemones, S. helianthus excretes a variety of toxins that can serve different purposes such as prey capture, protection and defense against predators. In specific, Sticholysin II (St II) is a cytolysin that has been extracted from the nematocysts of Sun Anemones and further examined by method of immunoperoxidase staining (structure included- Pennington et al.). Basulto et al. concludes that Sticholysin II functions in exclusive roles within the anemone's physiology, including predation and digestion. Another study revealed a similar lysin, known as Sticholysin I (St I), suggesting multiple isoforms of the same lysin. These two Sticholysins are further expanded on by Alvarez et al., whereas they are described as “pore-forming toxins”.

S. helianthus are also capable of producing polypeptide neurotoxins. Kem et al. reports a study where a newly found variant of actiniid neurotoxin, namely Sh 1, was extracted from S. helianthus and yielded genetic similarity to toxin II of Heteractic paumotensis., another species in family Stichodactylidae.

== Medical application ==
S. helianthus shows a variety of promising applications in the medical field due to its toxin-producing capability. ShK-186, a peptide inhibitor, is a toxin that has been previously implemented in clinical trials for its potential treatment of autoimmune diseases. It has been further developed into an “investigational drug”, known as Dalazatide, in which it targets the disease-causing cells corresponding to ailments including type 1 diabetes, lupus erythematosus and multiple sclerosis.

The aforementioned cytolysins, St I and St II, have also shown pharmacological potential in studies with guinea pig models, with direct implications on neural and cardiac activity. Due to its capability of protease inhibition, ShPI-1 is another toxin with medical potential. This toxin is a “non-specific inhibitor” and provides a variant with “increased biomedical potential” for its inhibition properties. Though many of these toxins require further research, S. helianthus serves great potential in biomedical applications for toxin production.

== Sources ==
- Pechenik, Jan A. (2010). Biology of the Invertebrates. McGraw-Hill Higher Education. ISBN 978-0-07-127041-0.
