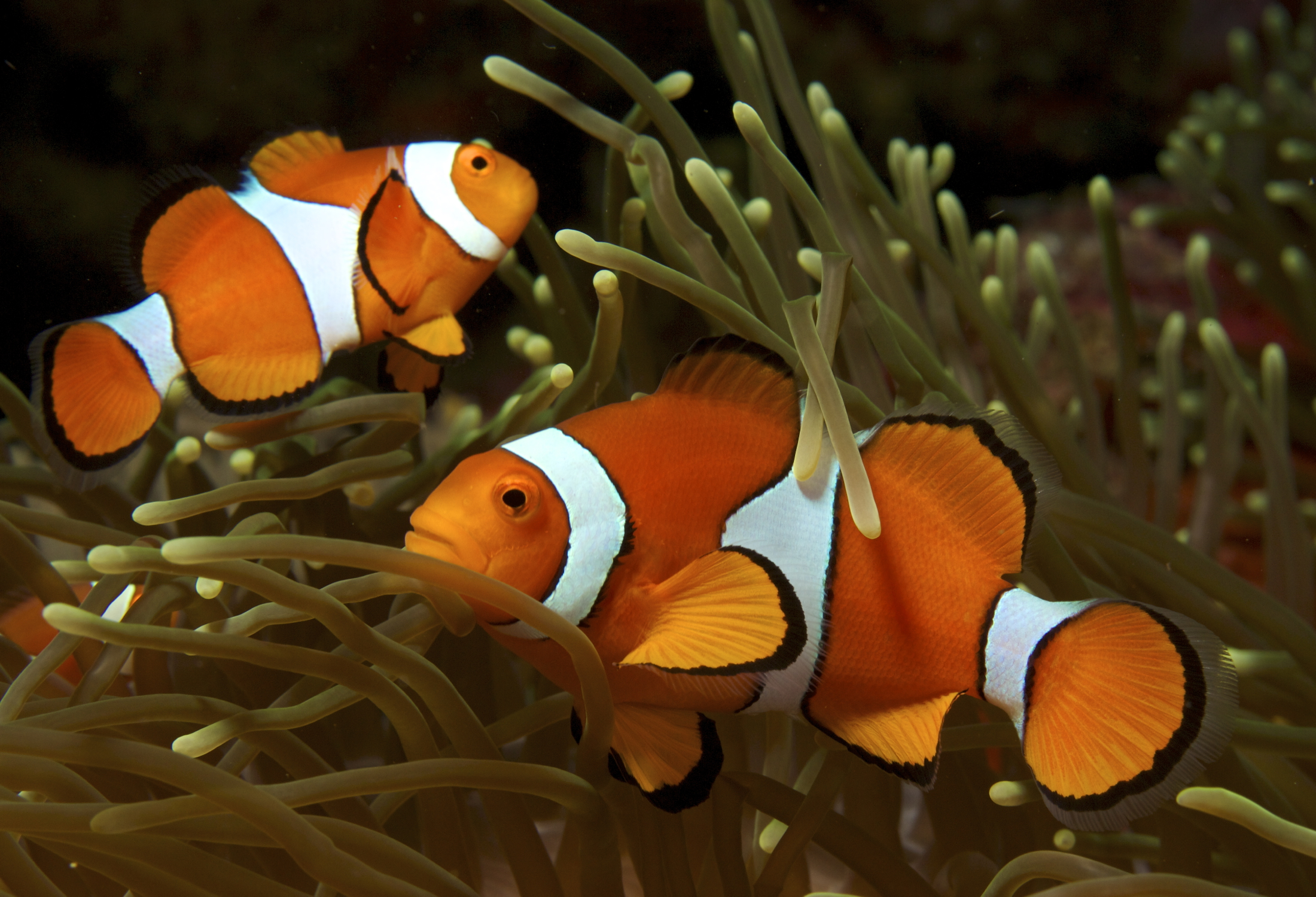
- Ocellaris clownfish (A. ocellaris)

Scientific classification
- Kingdom: Animalia
- Phylum: Chordata
- Class: Actinopterygii
- Division: Teleostei
- Order: Blenniiformes
- Family: Pomacentridae
- Subfamily: Amphiprioninae; Allen, 1975
- Genus: Amphiprion; Bloch & Schneider, 1801
- Distribution of clownfish

Synonyms
- Premnas Cuvier, 1816; Prochilus Bleeker (ex Klein), 1864; Actinicola Fowler, 1904; Phalerebus Whitley, 1929; Paramphiprion Wang, 1941

= Clownfish =

Monotypic subfamily of fishes

Clownfish or anemonefishes (genus Amphiprion) are saltwater fish found in the warm and tropical waters of the Indo-Pacific. They mainly inhabit coral reefs and have a distinctive colouration typically consisting of white vertical bars on a red, orange, yellow, brown or black background. Clownfish developed a symbiotic and mutually beneficial relationship with sea anemones, on which they rely for shelter and protection from predators. In turn, clownfish protect the anemone from anemone-eating fish, as well as clean and fan them, and attract beneficial microorganisms with their waste.

Clownfish are omnivorous and mostly feed on plankton. They live in groups consisting of a breeding female and male, along with some non-breeding individuals. Clownfish have a size-based dominance hierarchy with the breeding female ranking at the top, followed by the breeding male and then the largest non-breeder and so on. When the female disappears, the breeding male changes sex and takes her place while the others move up the hierarchy. During reproduction, the female deposits eggs on a rock near their anemone, and the male fertilises them. After hatching, clownfish disperse into the open ocean as larvae, eventually settling on the bottom and searching for an anemone host as juveniles.

The recognisable colour patterns and social nature of clownfish have contributed to their popularity. They are featured in the Disney/Pixar film Finding Nemo (2003) and are sought after in the aquarium trade. The ocellaris clownfish ranks among the most commonly traded marine fish. Many captive clownfish were taken from the wild and this has led to their decline. Clownfish are more numerous in marine protected areas, where collecting is forbidden. Other threats to populations include global warming, which causes ocean warming and acidification.

== Taxonomy ==
Clownfish are damselfishes (family Pomacentridae) in the genus Amphiprion (Greek amphi, 'on both sides' and prion 'saw'), which was coined by Marcus Elieser Bloch and Johann Gottlob Theaenus Schneider in 1801 using the red saddleback anemonefish as the type species. Georges Cuvier considered the maroon clownfish morphologically different enough to be placed in its own genus Premnas in 1816. The status of Premnas has been disputed over the years, switching between a synonym or subgenus of Amphiprion and being its own genus. In 2021, two expansive phylogenetic analyses of damselfishes found the species to be within Amphiprion, making Premnas a junior synonym. In 1975, ichthyologist Gerald R. Allen placed clownfish in their own subfamily Amphiprioninae. A 2009 genetic study suggested creating the tribe Amphiprionini for clownfish and moving them to the subfamily Pomacentrinae. Eschmeyer's Catalog of Fishes considers the genus to be part of Pomacentrinae though scientific papers still use Amphiprioninae. (Note: Examples of articles placing clownfish in their own subfamily of Amphiprioninae)

=== Phylogeny ===
The clownfish lineage diverged from that of other living damselfishes around 35 million years ago (mya) during the late Eocene, and the most recent common ancestor of extant species is dated around 10.5 mya during the Early Miocene. A 2014 study placed their origin in the waters of the Malay Archipelago. Clownfish experienced an increase in species diversification starting around 5 mya, with two major adaptive radiations; one centred on the Malay Archipelago and a later one in the waters of the western Indian Ocean. There is genetic evidence for high amounts of interbreeding between species through their evolutionary history. Clownfish speciation has been linked to their sea anemone hosts species of which can be found in different habitats, thus driving ecological separation.

Prior to 2025, 28 living species of clownfish were recognised along with two hybrids, the white-bonnet clownfish and Thielle's clownfish. In 2025, a new species, the Polynesian anemonefish (A. maohiensis), was classified. This fish was previously seen as a colour morph of the orange-fin anemonefish. In 1972, Allen listed five major clades or complexes based on morphology; percula, akallopisos, ephippium, polymnus and clarkii with the maroon clownfish being in a clade on its own. A 2014 study lists two more major clades: Australian and Indian, with the maroon clownfish under the percula clade and the orange-fin anemonefish and wide-band anemonefish being single-species clades. A 2021 study placed the members of the clade polymnus in the Indian clade, while a 2025 study found the maroon clownfish to be a single-species clade.

The following cladogram of 28 clownfish species is based on a 2025 genetic study, with clade/complex group labels based on a 2014 study.

- Amphiprion
  - Maroon clownfish (A. biaculeatus)
  - - - Orange clownfish (A. percula)
      - Ocellaris clownfish (A. ocellaris)
    - - Wide-band clownfish (A. latezonatus)
      - - - akallopisos
            - Pink skunk clownfish (A. perideraion)
            - - Pacific anemonefish (A. pacificus)
              - - Nosestripe clownfish (A. akallopisos)
                - Orange skunk clownfish (A. sandaracinos)
          - - clarkii
              - Three-band anemonefish (A. tricinctus)
              - Clark's anemonefish (A. clarkii)
            - ephippium
              - Barber's clownfish (A. barberi)
              - - - Tomato clownfish (A. frenatus)
                  - Red saddleback anemonefish (A. ephippium)
                - - Cinnamon clownfish (A. melanopus)
                  - Australian clownfish (A. rubrocinctus)
        - - - Orange-fin anemonefish (A. chrysopterus)
            - Australian
              - McCulloch's anemonefish (A. mccullochi)
              - Barrier reef anemonefish (A. akindynos)
          - - polymnus
              - Sebae clownfish (A. sebae)
              - Saddleback clownfish (A. polymnus)
            - Indian
              - - Maldive anemonefish (A. nigripes)
                - Chagos anemonefish (A. chagosensis)
              - - - Mauritian anemonefish (A. chrysogaster)
                  - Seychelles anemonefish (A. fuscocaudatus)
                - - - Red Sea clownfish (A. bicinctus)
                    - Oman anemonefish (A. omanensis)
                  - - Allard's clownfish (A. allardi)
                    - Madagascar anemonefish (A. latifasciatus)

== Characteristics ==
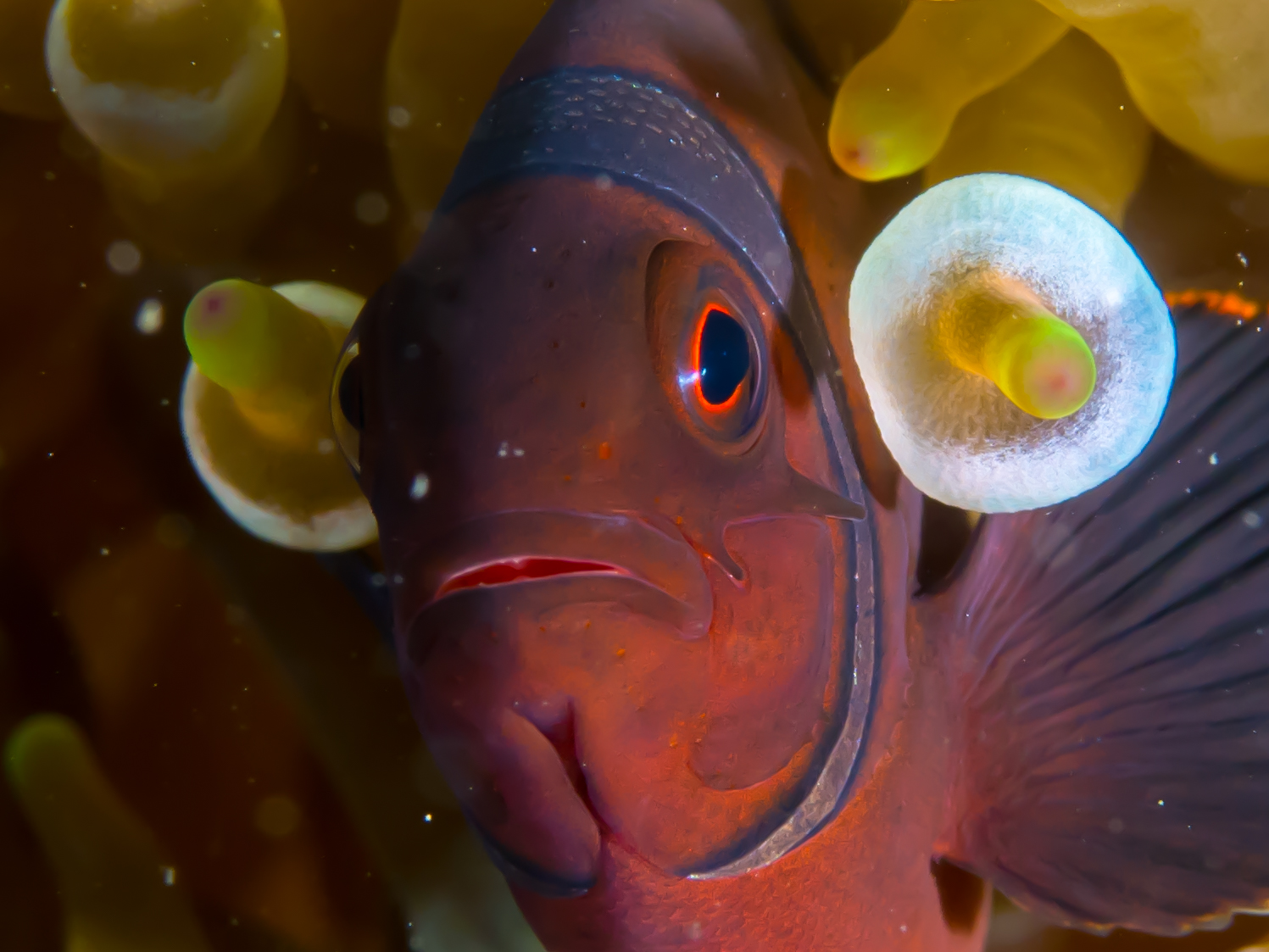
The face of the maroon clownfish

Clownfish vary in size; the maroon clownfish can reach 160 mm (6.3 in) long while the orange clownfish reaches only 80 mm (3.1 in). Females are larger than males and the smallest individuals in a group are only 6–15 mm (0.24–0.59 in). Clownfish vary from oval-shaped to streamlined, and have rounded heads that lack scales between the snout and eyes. Teeth are present on both the oral and pharyngeal (throat) jaws but absent on the palate, and may be conical or chisel-shaped. Clownfish have saw-shaped edges along the operculum (gill covering) and under the eyes, which is the source of their genus name. The dorsal fin has 10 spines followed by 14–20 soft rays. It varies in shape; the ocellaris clownfish has a large recess between the spines and soft rays, while in the red saddleback anemonefish they are mostly continuous. Rays number 15–21 in the pectoral fins, five in the pelvic fins, 11–15 in the anal fin, and 14–15 in the tail fin.

Clownfish eyes are located at the sides of the head, as in most fish, but they can be seen from the front suggesting they have some binocular vision. Additional light can enter their eyes via small gaps between the iris and lens, and the fish can see both in colour and ultraviolet light. They have a single nostril opening with an arrow-shaped olfactory (smelling) organ positioned around the midline of the olfactory cavity (within the nasal cavity). This organ often contains extra flaps (lamella) that are fork-like, a unique trait among fish. Their ears appear to be attuned for relatively low frequencies (75–900 Hz).

=== Colour patterns ===
Clownfish have distinctive colour patterns consisting of a red, orange, yellow, brown or black background with zero to three white vertical bars lined with black. Some species have a horizontal bar along the back, while the red saddleback anemonefish has no bars at all. Orange, yellow and red colouration is created by xanthophore pigment cells, black and brown by melanophores and the white bars by iridophores. Vertical bar formation starts at the front: species with only one bar have it at the head, those with two at the head and trunk, and those with three at the head, trunk and tail. Variations in the number of vertical bars between individuals of the same species occurs in the cinnamon clownfish, saddleback clownfish and Clark's anemonefish. Numerous colour morph mutations occur particularly in captive clownfish, including melanism, a "misbar" (incomplete vertical bars) morph, and a "golden" morph that is caused by a lack of both melanophores and iridophores. There are also morphs with thickened and merged bars.

A 2018 study found that clownfish species with only one or no vertical bars tend to be more specialised for anemone species with greater toxicity and shorter tentacles. Conversely, those with two or three bars are more likely to use more anemone species within their range, several of which have longer tentacles. The researchers suggest that vertical bars function in camouflage while warning colouration is more important for species that cannot hide in the tentacles of their hosts. This would be a unique case since it warns about another animal, namely the anemone. The study found no evidence for the use of the bars in species recognition, noting the geographic and ecological overlap between the similar-looking orange and ocellaris clownfish. By contrast, another 2018 study supported species recognition, finding little overlap between species with the same bar numbers within various clownfish communities. A 2024 study also found evidence for this function as the ocellaris clownfish can distinguish between individuals of different bar numbers.

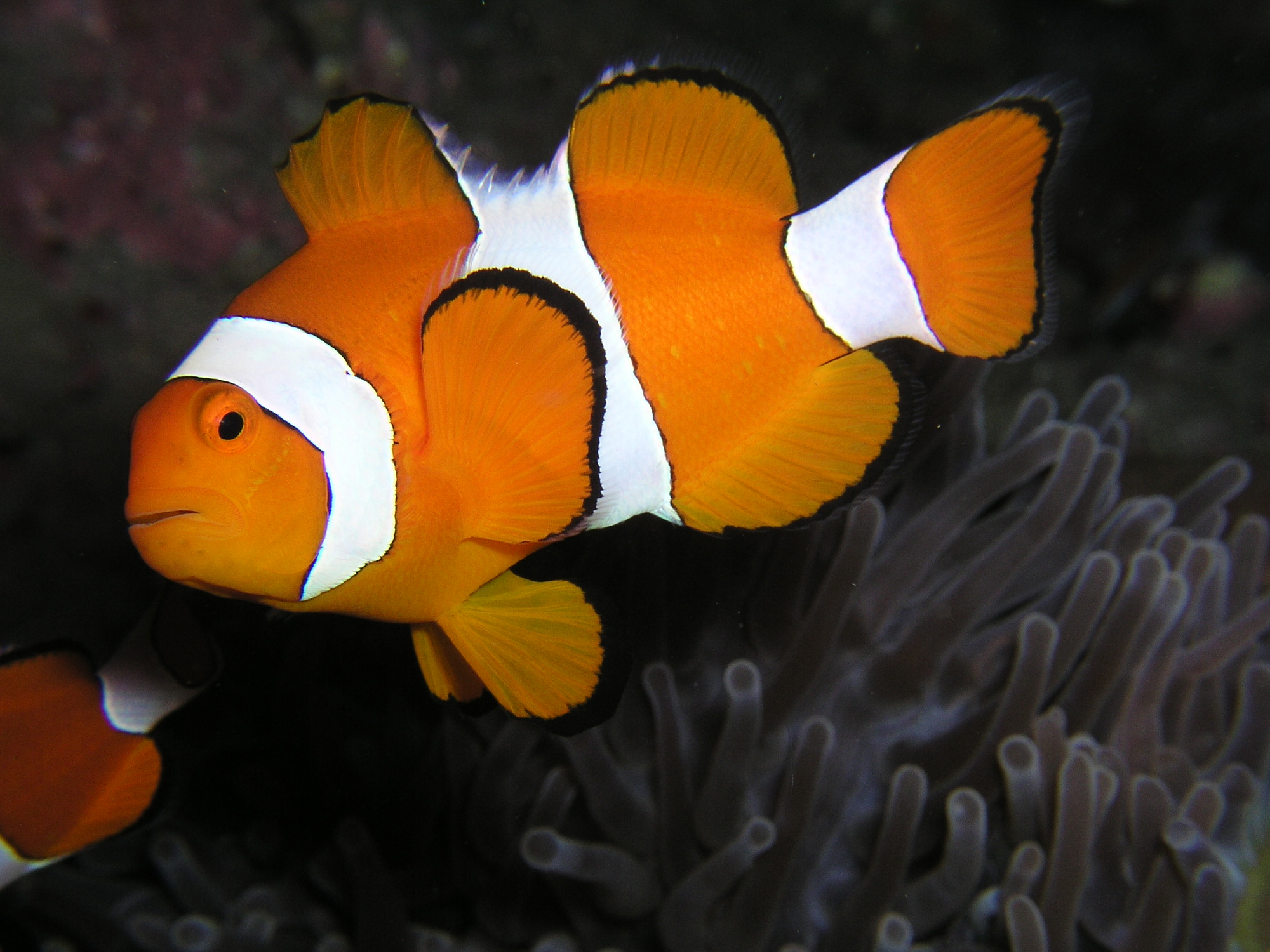
Ocellaris clownfish with three vertical bars

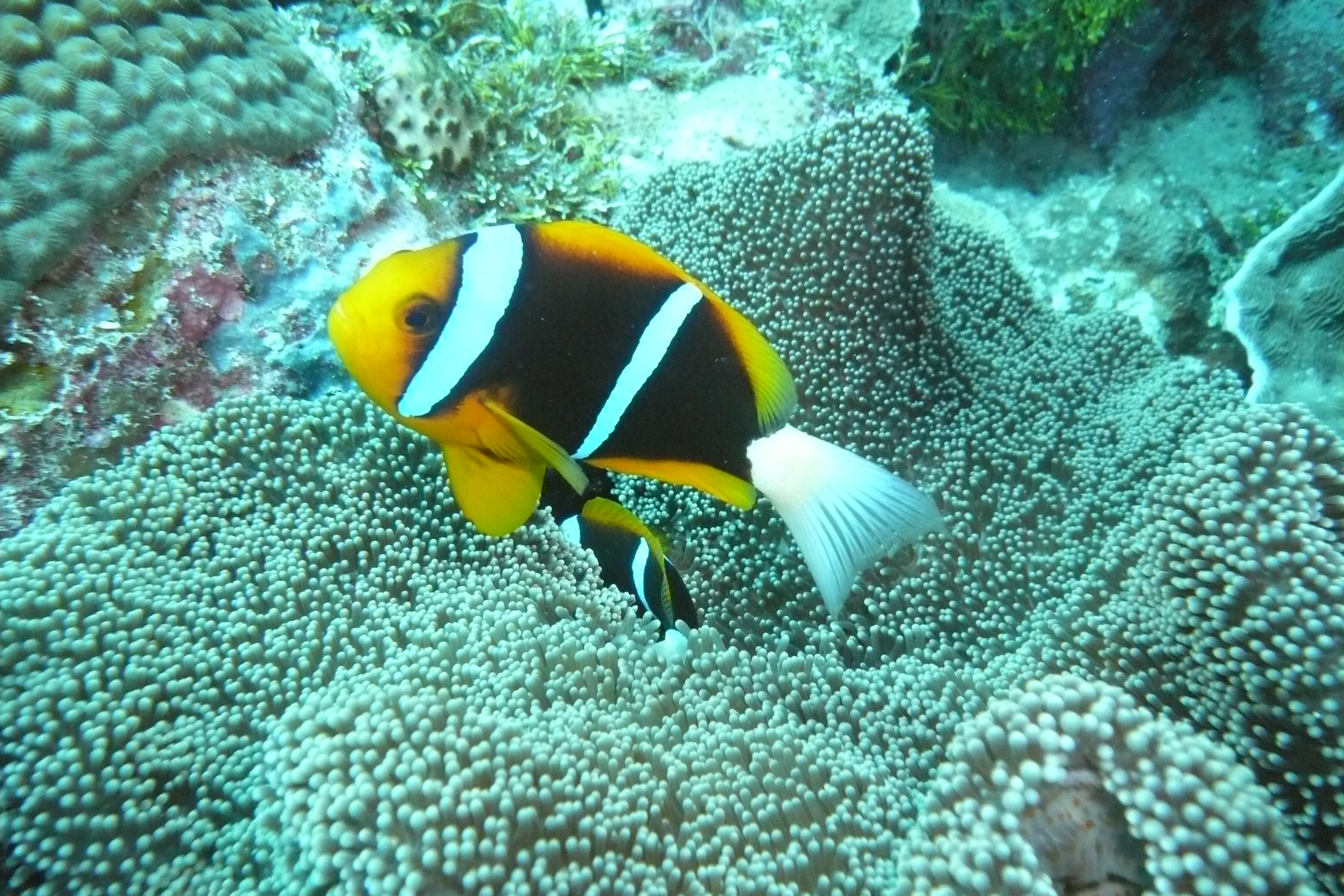
Orange-fin anemonefish with two vertical bars

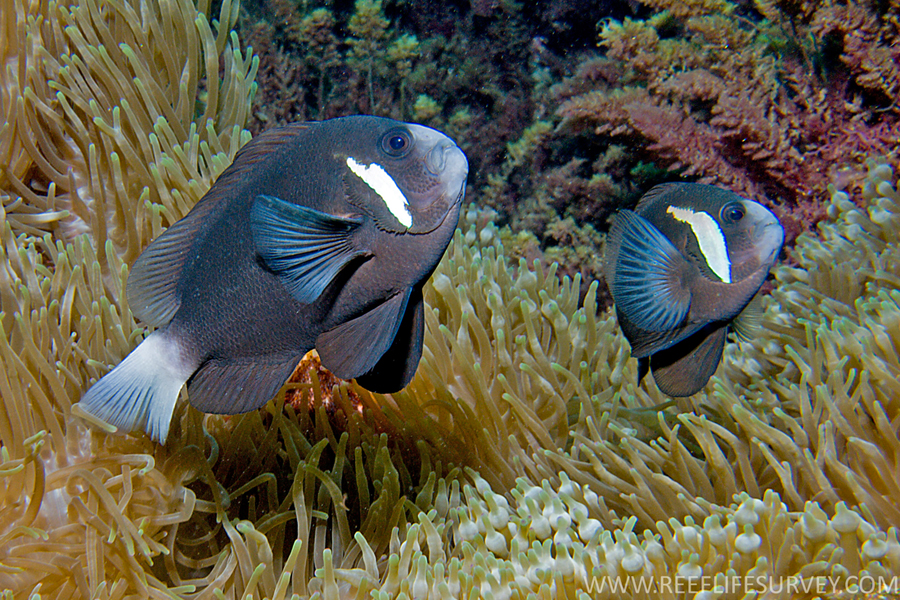
McCulloch's anemonefish with one vertical bar

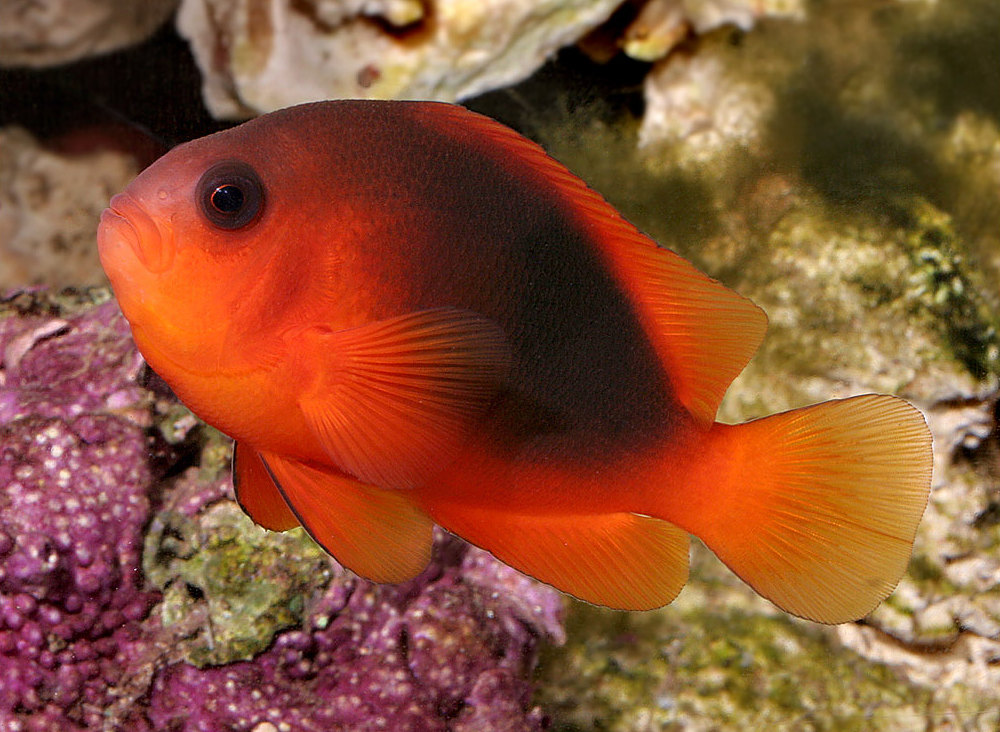
Red saddleback anemonefish with no bars

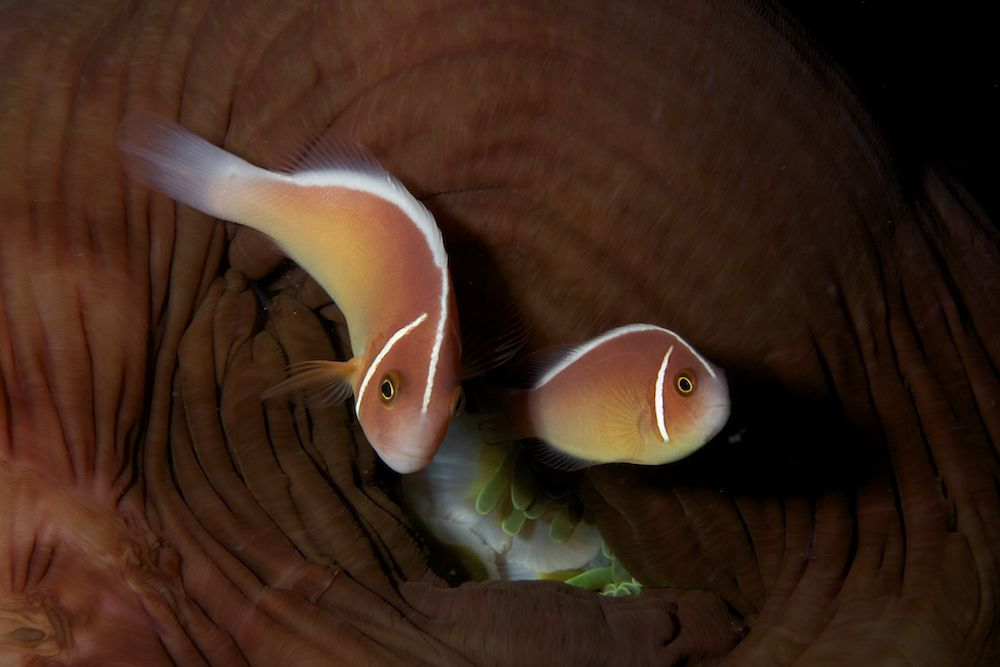
Pink skunk clownfish with one vertical bar and a horizontal dorsal bar

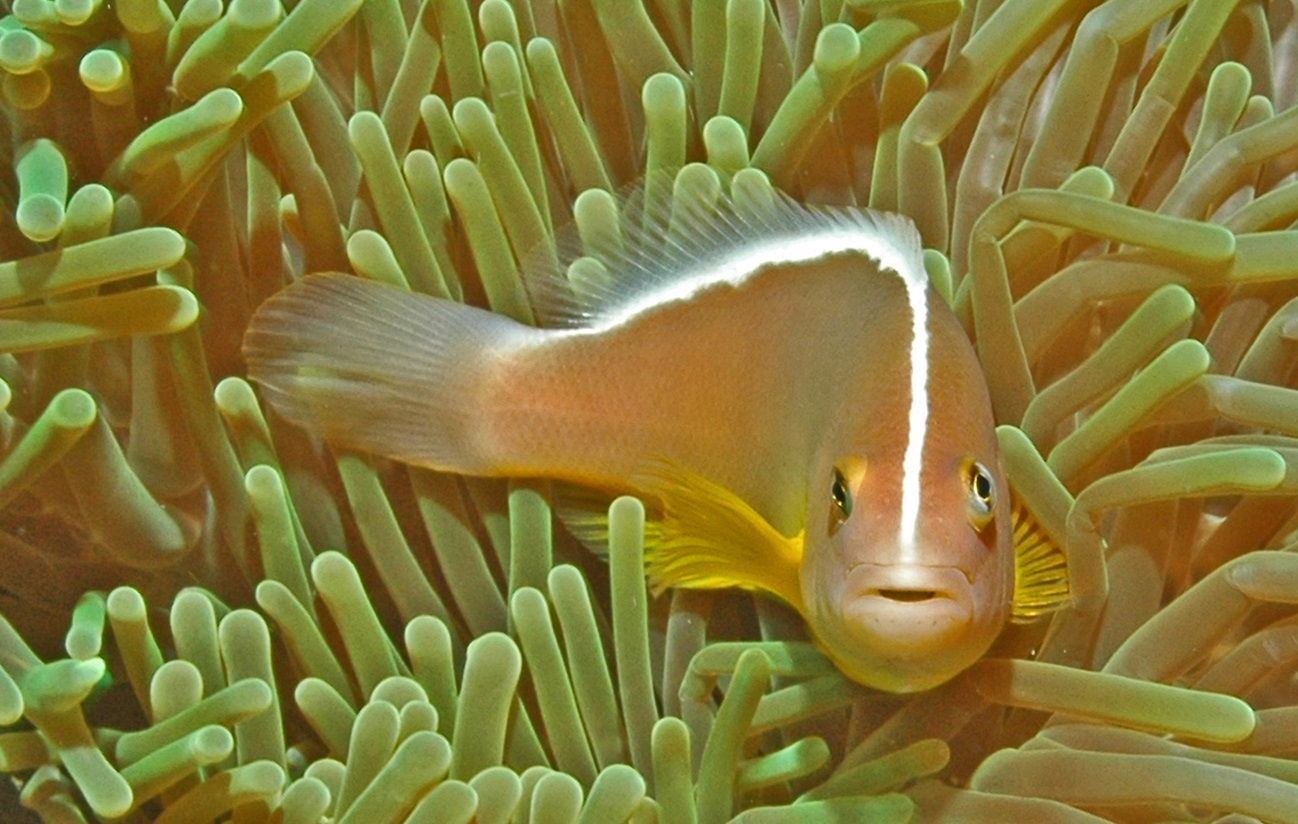
Orange skunk clownfish with a horizontal dorsal bar

== Distribution and habitat ==
Clownfish inhabit warm and tropical waters spanning the Indian Ocean and the western Pacific; from the Red Sea to French Polynesia, and from Japan down to Australia. Some species are more widespread than others, and some live only around islands or archipelagos. Areas closer to the edges of their distribution have fewer species; both the Red Sea and French Polynesia have only one species each. By contrast, as many as 12 species can be found in an area in other regions such as Southeast Asian and northern Australian waters.

Clownfish are limited by the distribution of their sea anemone hosts, which is usually near the surface at the sunlight zone where there are more photosynthetic microorganisms (zooxanthellae) for anemones to depend on. This includes coral reefs and surrounding areas. Within a reef, clownfish species that use the same anemone species as their main hosts avoid competition by having individuals at different zones (nearshore, mid-lagoon, and outer bank). Some species cohabitate on the same anemone host.

== Behaviour and ecology ==
Cinnamon clownfish swimming around an anemone

=== Feeding ===
Clownfish are omnivorous, and mostly feed on planktonic food such as algae, copepods and larval tunicates. Algae makes up much of the diet of the pink skunk clownfish. Clownfish also feed on the waste discharged by the anemone. Feeding takes up most of a clownfish's daily activity. Where predators are less common, clownfish may forage in an area as large as 20 m^{2} (220 sq ft) around their anemone. Otherwise they are restricted to feeding in the water column above their host. The dominant pair in a clownfish group feed further from the anemone than the smaller subordinates.

=== Relationship with sea anemones ===
Clownfish have a mutualistic and symbiotic relationship with sea anemones. They acclimate themselves to their hosts by touching, nipping and fanning the tentacles over a period of minutes to days. The main benefit of living among anemones is protection from predators by anemone's stinging tentacles. A straying clownfish retreats to the safety of the tentacles when it encounters a potential threat, and it is always near its host, with smaller fish rarely leaving the oral disc. A clownfish may even swim into the coelenteron (gastrovascular cavity), though Allen observes this to be uncommon. Nighttime is spent resting deep among the tentacles. A less important benefit for clownfish is nourishment from the discharged waste and parasites.

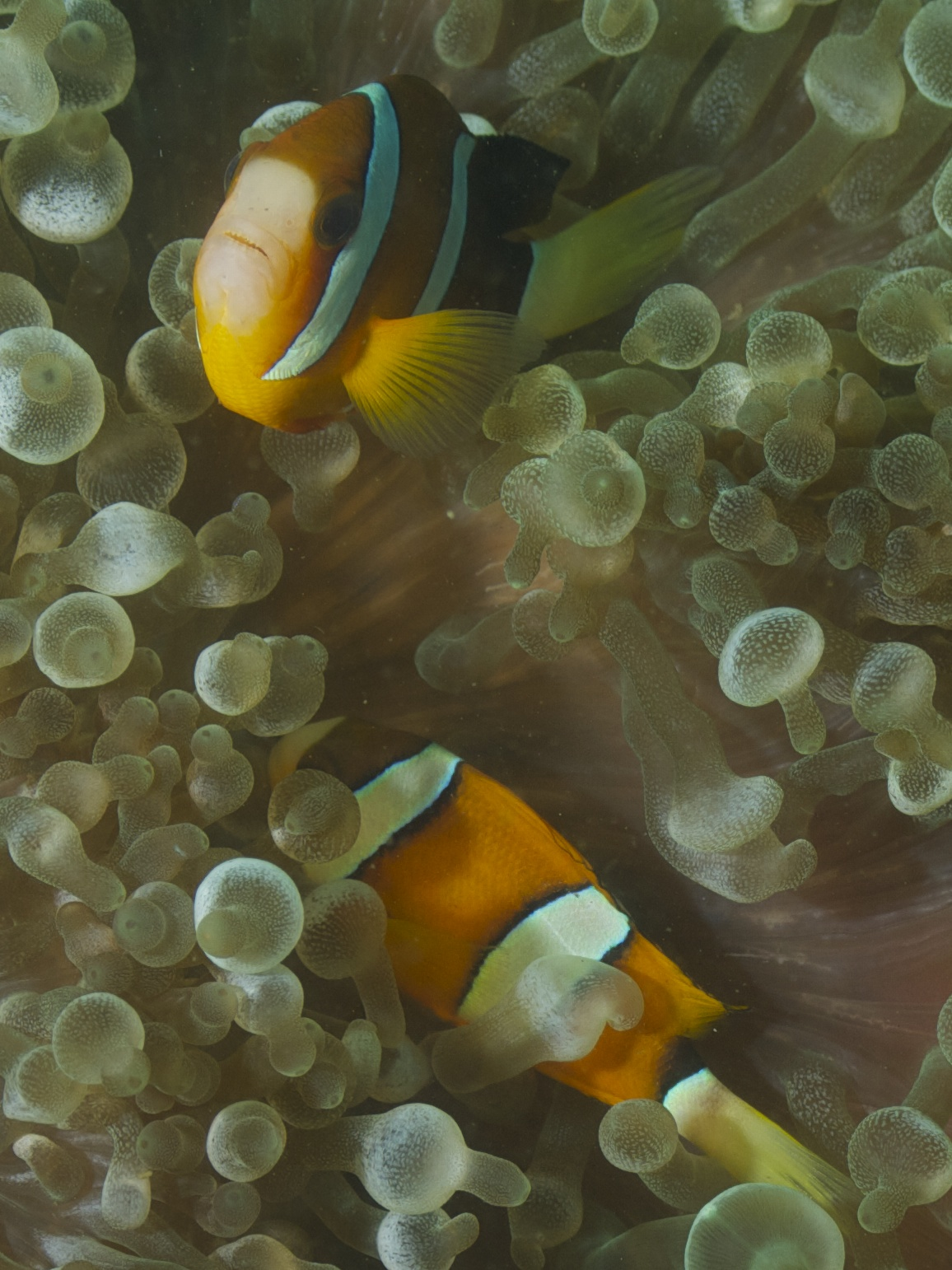
Clark's anemonefish within a bubble-tip anemone. This clownfish utilises all ten anemone species that host clownfish species.

Anemones are less dependent on clownfish than the fish are on them, as is evident as many individuals of host species lack clownfish. Nevertheless, clownfish contribute to the survival of their hosts by guarding from anemone-eating fish such as the raccoon butterflyfish. Other benefits they provide include the removal of copepod parasites, increased oxygen flow via the rapid movements of the fish's fins and the attraction of additional zooxanthellae by clownfish waste. A 2005 study found that anemones grew and regenerated faster in the presence of clownfish groups, and attributed this to ammonium from clownfish waste. Experimental evidence finds that when a clownfish is given small and large pieces of food, it consumes the former and gives the latter to their anemone.

A total of ten sea anemone species are used by clownfish as hosts: the malu anemone, sebae anemone, magnificent sea anemone, corkscrew tentacle sea anemone, Mertens' carpet sea anemone, Haddon's sea anemone, giant carpet anemone, adhesive anemone, bubble-tip anemone, and beaded sea anemone. Some clownfishes are generalist in their choice of hosts, while others are more specialised. Clark's anemonefish is the most generalised species and utilises all ten anemone species, while nine clownfish species — the tomato clownfish, Chagos anemonefish, Pacific anemonefish, Seychelles anemonefish, Madagascar anemonefish, McCulloch's anemonefish, Maldive anemonefish, sebae clownfish, and maroon clownfish — use just one anemone species respectively. Desirable traits in a host include long tentacles to hide among. In addition, certain anemones like the beaded and bubble-tip sea anemone have tentacles with knob-like structures, which provide more surface area for the fish to conceal itself. The magnificent sea anemone can provide extra protection as clownfish can hide inside its soft body when it engulfs its tentacles. The potency of venom is also important; highly toxic anemone species tend to have smaller tentacles and so provide less shelter but more protection. Clownfish can cohabitate with other species on an anemone, including other clownfish, other fish such as the threespot dascyllus, and various decapods. Tolerance of the threespot dascyllus can vary between clownfish species.

The ability of clownfish to avoid being stung is attributed to their mucus coating. There is evidence that clownfish mucus mimics the molecules or bacteria of anemone mucus and lacks the trigger for the anemone's nematocysts (stinging barbs). Mucus thickness may also play a role, but the evidence is ambiguous. There is dispute over how much of the mucus is innate to the clownfish and how much is gained from the anemone during the acclimation period. This may vary between species. A 2019 study found evidence that clownfish exchange microbiota with their anemone hosts.

=== Social structure ===
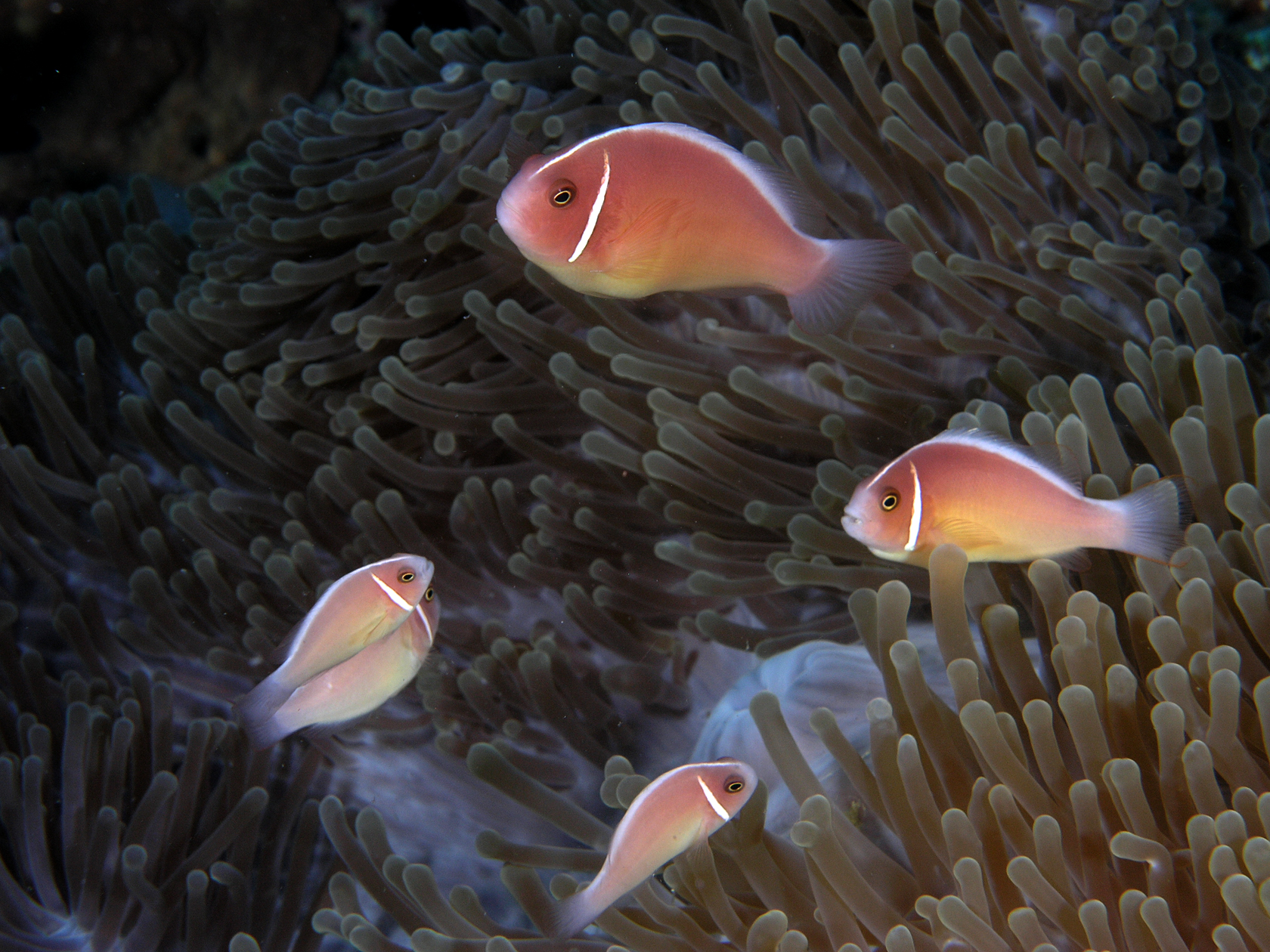
Group of pink skunk clownfish, including the dominant pair and non-breeding individuals

A group of clownfish occupying an anemone usually consists of a breeding female and male along with some non-breeding individuals. Dominance in clownfish groups is based on size. The largest fish, the breeding female, is the most dominant. Next is the second-largest, the breeding male, followed by the third-largest (the largest non-breeder), and so on. In orange clownfish in particular, individuals get around 26 percent larger going up the hierarchy. In this species the number of non-breeders ranges from zero to four, with group size depending on anemone size, as well as the size of the female as larger females allow for more members without unbalancing the size ratio between them. Members of a group are unrelated.

The male clownfish changes into a female (protandrous sequential hermaphroditism) when the previous one is lost, while the largest non-breeder becomes a male and the others rise in rank. New fish that join the group rank at the bottom. Non-breeders are forced to wait for their time to become breeders, since nearby anemones are occupied and they are too small to challenge the dominants. The dominant pair controls membership of the group and drives away individuals when the anemone gets too full, particularly those that are close to them in size. Thus newcomers control their growth rate so they can remain smaller than their immediate superior to avoid getting evicted. Clownfishes maintain their dominance hierarchy via displays, sound production and chasing. Sounds produced by clownfishes include "clicks", "grunts", "pops" and "chirps". Dominants chase their subordinates while producing a sound consisting of one or more long pulses. A subordinate submits by emitting a sound with quicker pulses while shaking its head. Clownfishes appear to produce sounds via the jaws and teeth, which are amplified by the swim bladder.

One study of captive ocellaris clownfish found that the dominant pair are the most territorial while non-breeders are much less so. Both the male and female direct their aggression against intruders of the same sex, though resident males are more likely to display than to attack. Similarly, non-breeding intruders are more likely to be simply intimidated. Another study of the same species found that they were more aggressive toward fish with three vertical bars, followed by those with two, one, and none. This suggests that they recognise and see members of their own species as their main competition for anemones. Clark's anemonefish is recorded to share hosts with juveniles of other clownfish species such as orange skunk clownfish and pink skunk clownfish. A 2002 study found that dominant Clark's anemonefish acted more aggressively toward juvenile pink skunk clownfish than those of their own species, particularly those of a larger size.

Clark's anemonefish dominant chasing subordinate while producing aggressive sounds

Tomato clownfish subordinate head-shaking while producing submissive sounds

=== Reproduction and lifecycle ===
Clownfish breed year-round in tropical waters while in more temperate waters, like those around Japan, breeding occurs mostly in spring and summer. Only the dominant female and male reproduce, which mostly occurs during a full moon. In the days leading up to spawning, the pair perform courtship rituals that involve the male chasing and nibbling the female as well as erecting his dorsal, pelvic and anal fins while staying motionless in front or alongside her. Both the female and male then prepare a nest by cleaning up a nearby rock. Here the female deposits eggs for the male to fertilise. Clownfishes lay up to a thousand eggs, which are conical in shape, 3–4 mm (0.12–0.16 in) long and stick to the rocky substrate by bundles of short fibres. The male tends to the fertilised eggs, cleaning and guarding them as well as fanning them with his pectoral fins.

Incubation lasts six to seven days. The eggs start out bright orange and progressively darken, and the eyes of the embryos develop and become visible. The fish break out of their capsules during nighttime. After hatching, clownfishes enter the larval and pelagic (open ocean) stage of their development. This stage lasts up to 12 days, which is shorter than in other damselfishes, where it can last for 70 days. Larval clownfishes are initially transparent, except for the eyes, yolk sac and some pigment spots. Over time they begin to metamorphosise; growing in size and developing their fins, sensory and internal organs, notochord flexion and colouration. Clownfish larvae can disperse widely across open ocean; the Oman anemonefish has been recorded travelling over 400 km (250 mi) along ocean currents.

As they enter the juvenile stage, clownfish begin settling to the ocean floor and find an anemone host, while transitioning to a more diurnal (daytime) lifestyle. Juveniles continue to grow and develop their adult colouration, but cannot produce sex cells until they ascend to dominance within a group. Juveniles possess both ovarian and testicular tissue on the gonads, the latter expands and pushes aside the former when the juvenile becomes a breeding male. When transitioning into a female, the ovarian tissue expands and fully absorbs the testicular tissue. The transition from male to female starts with an increase in body size and feminisation of the brain, followed by gonadal changes and then behavioural changes. The process can last months to years. Clownfishes can live for over 20 years; the orange clownfish is estimated to reach 30 years, which is long for a fish of its size.

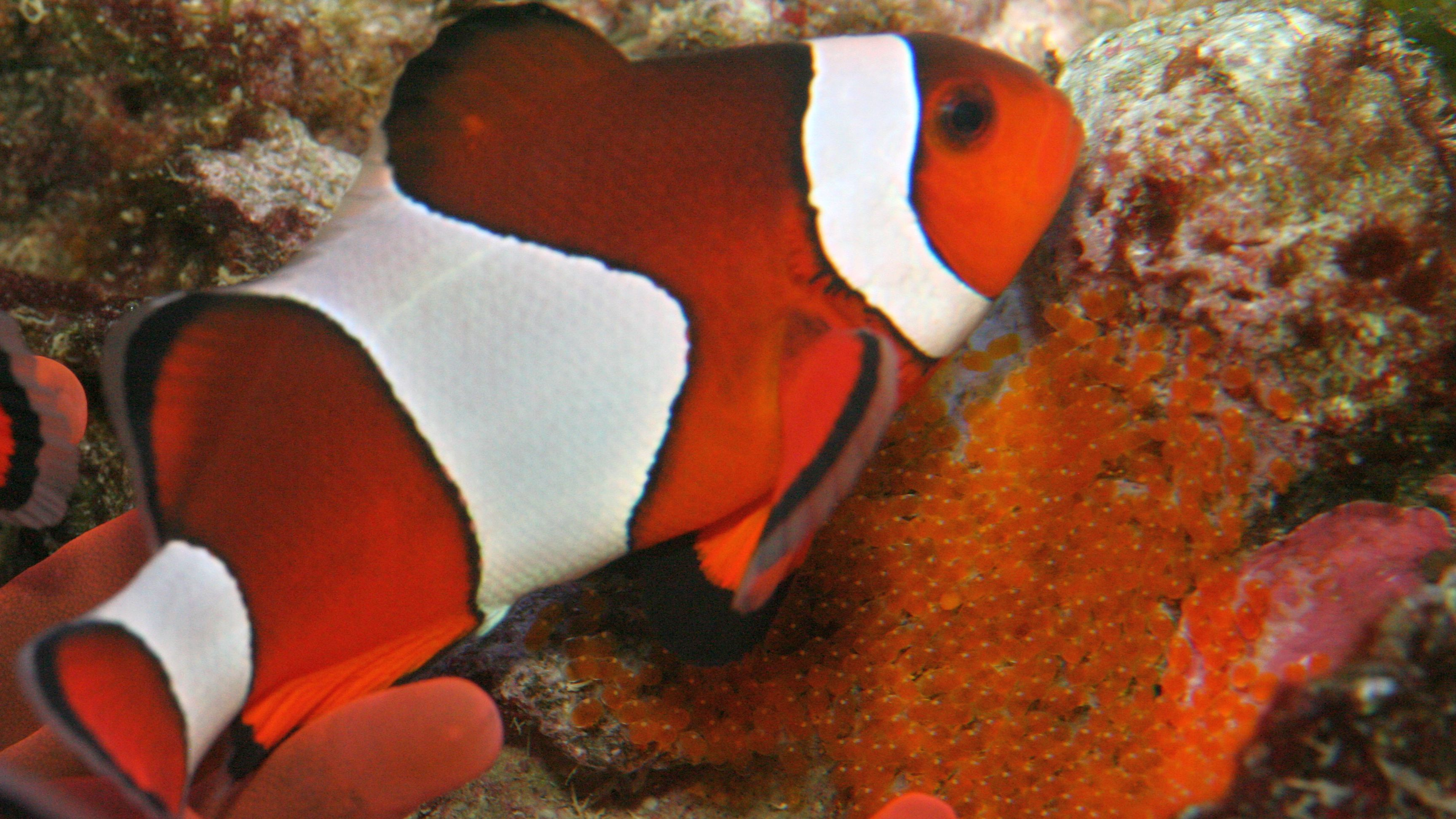
Ocellaris clownfish male tending to eggs

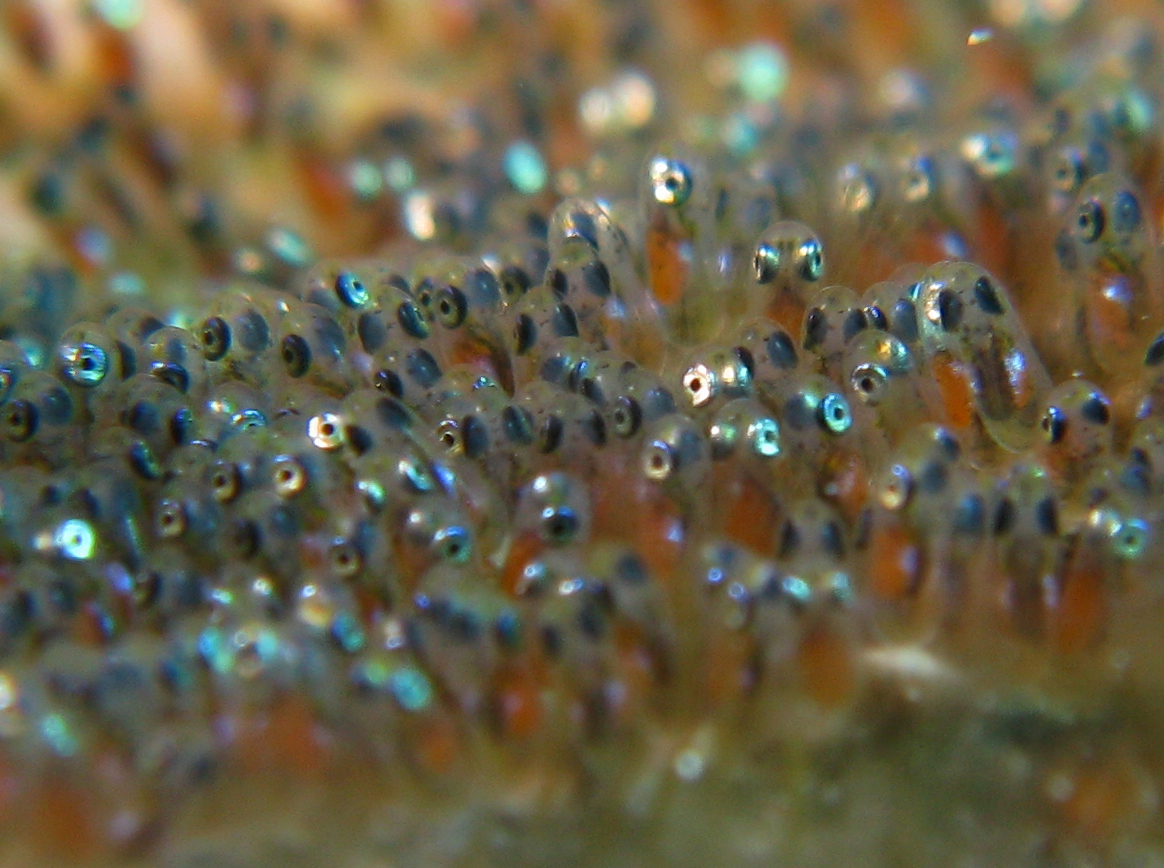
Clownfish eggs closer to hatching

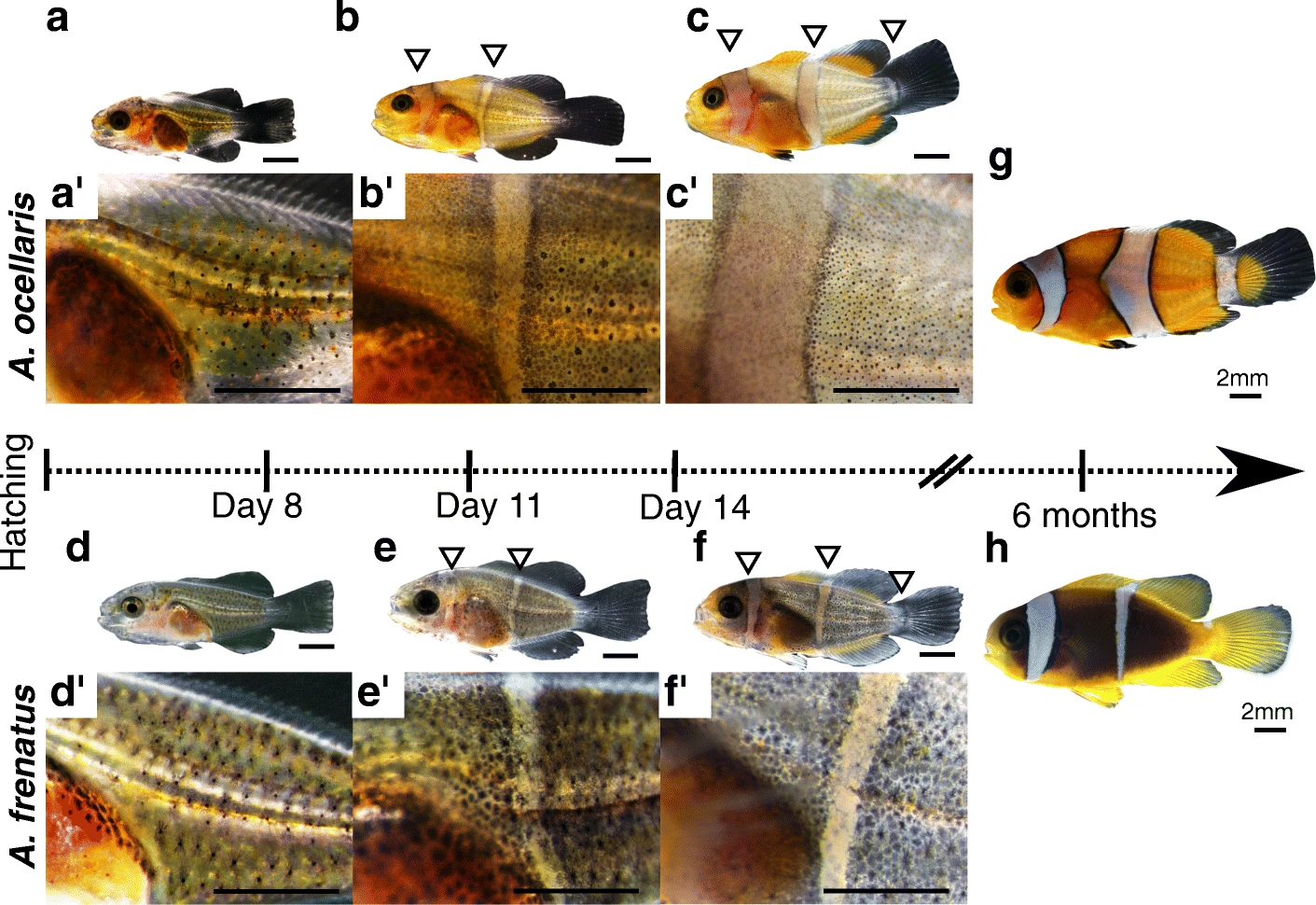
Development of ocellaris clownfish (above) and tomato clownfish

=== Parasites ===
Parasites of clownfish include copepods, trematodes, nematodes and acanthocephalans. One study of four species near Nha Trang, Vietnam found that the most common parasites are the trematode Hysterolecitha nahaensis and the nematode Spirocamallanus istiblenni. Clownfish can also be infected with the protozoan Brooklynella hostilis, which causes "clownfish disease". Fish with this disease stop feeding, breathe heavily, gasp, develop thick white mucus, and lose their vibrant colours.

== Captivity ==
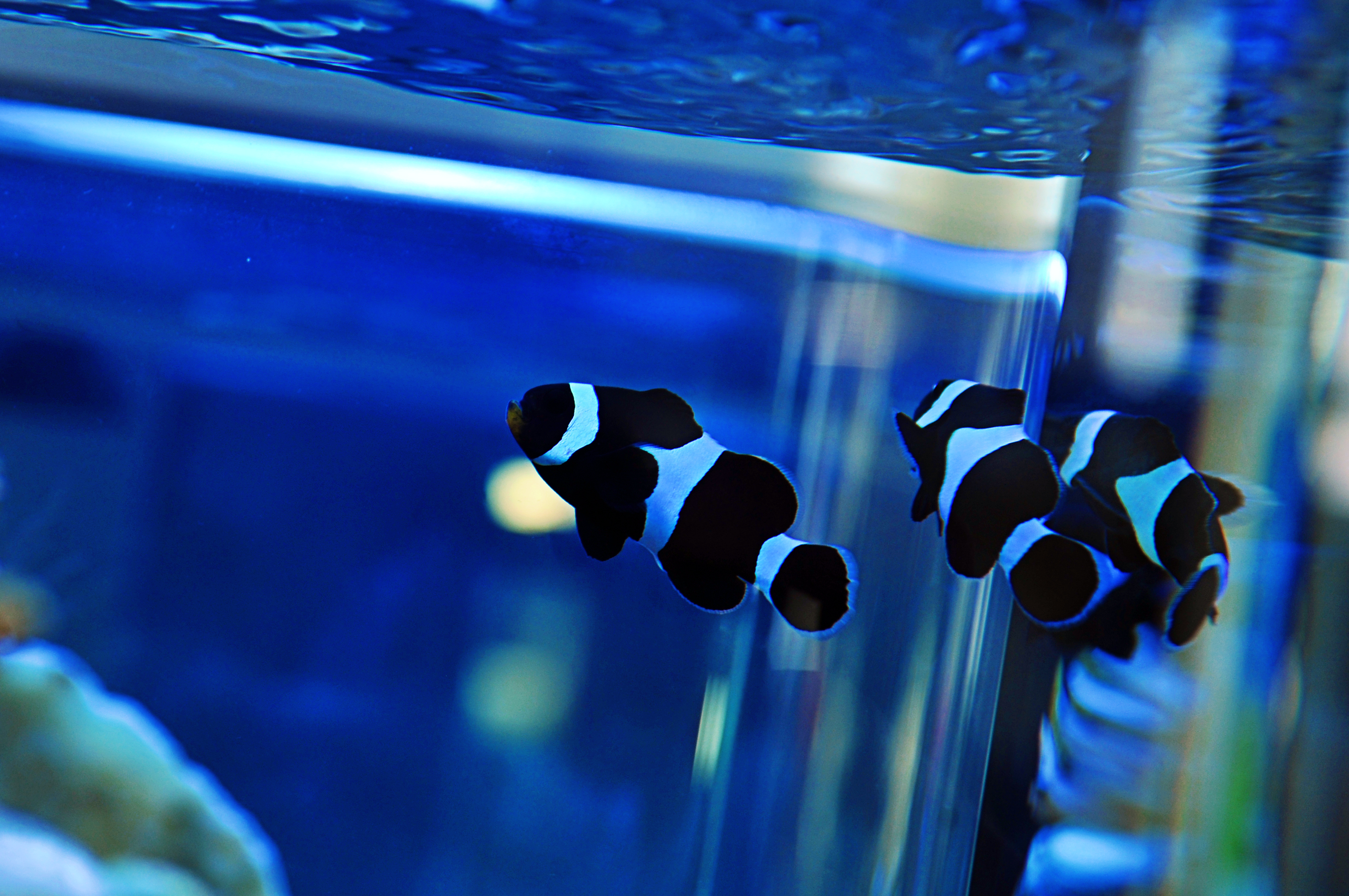
Melanistic clownfish in fish tank

Clownfishes are popular in the aquarium trade due to their colouration, sociability and longevity. With no predators, they can thrive in captivity without sea anemones. Captive clownfish have been shown capable of thriving in brackish conditions, even reproducing. Between 1997 and 2002, the ocellaris clownfish was among the most traded marine fish worldwide, while in 2011, the species was the most popular imported clownfish species in the US, accounting for almost half of all imported clownfish and around three percent of all imported marine fish. Other popularly traded clownfish include the maroon clownfish and orange clownfish. The highest number of individual clownfish were imported from the Philippines and Indonesia.

The 2003 Disney/Pixar film Finding Nemo has been suggested to have led to an increase in the taking and purchase of clownfish. However, a 2017 study found no evidence for an immediate increase in the sales of wild-caught ocellaris or orange clownfish—the two species to which the title character bears a resemblance. Clownfish are also bred in aquaculture, though it is unknown how their numbers compare to wild caught specimens. In 2011, the wide-band anemonefish, which is endemic to Australia, was mostly exported to the US from the Philippines, suggesting they were captive bred. Captive clownfish with new colour morphs, known as "designer clownfish", are particularly popular in the trade.

== Conservation ==
As of 2025, 25 of the 29 clownfish species along with the hybrid white bonnet anemonefish are assessed by the IUCN Red List; most are classified as Least-concern except for Mccullochi's anemonefish, which is classified as Vulnerable. Additionally, the wide-band anemonefish is listed as Data Deficient. Threats to clownfish populations in the wild include ocean warming and acidification, exploitation for the aquarium trade and human development along the coast; the first two are linked to global warming.

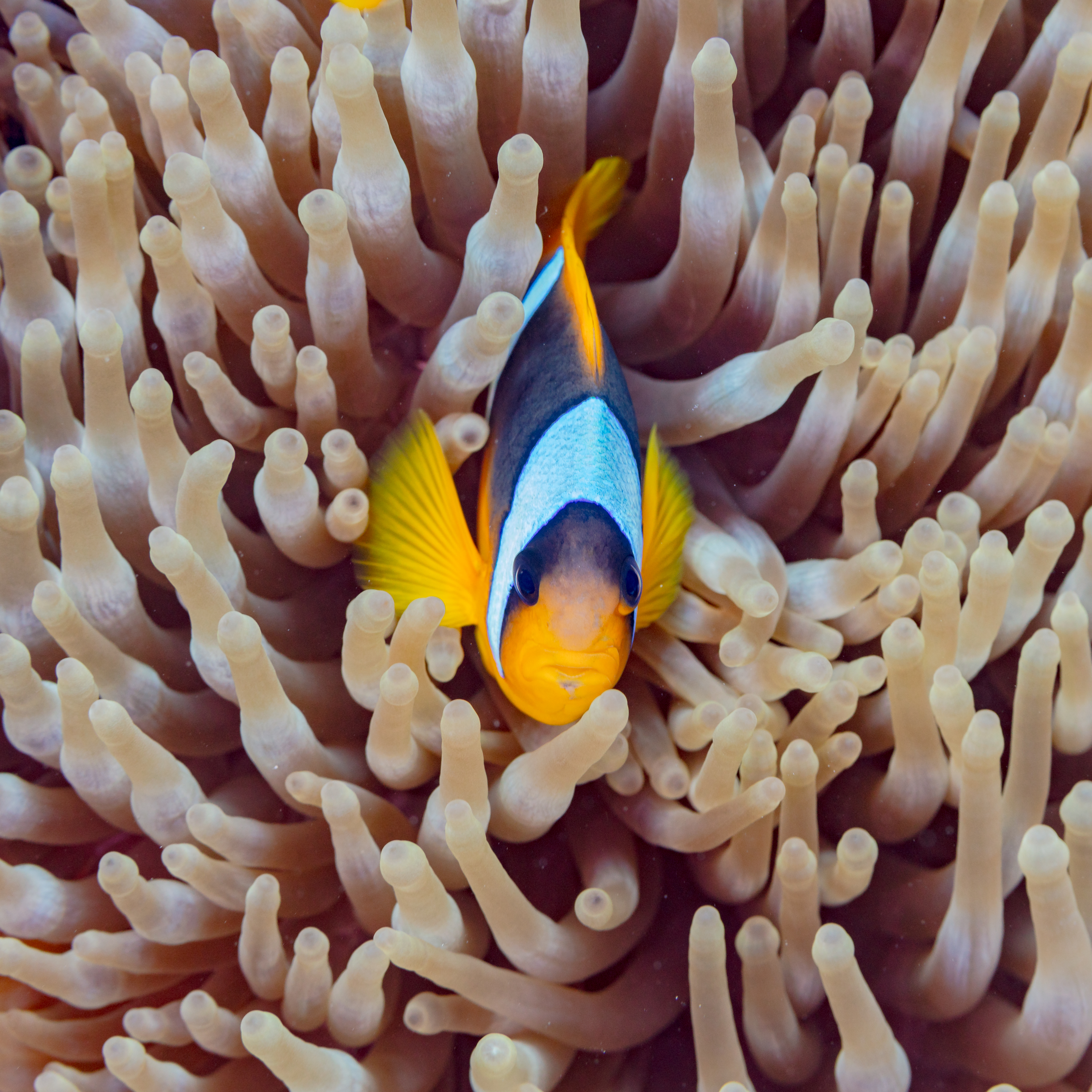
Red Sea clownfish, endemic to the Red Sea

One effect ocean warming has on clownfish is the bleaching of their anemone hosts (similar to coral bleaching), which is considered to be their greatest threat. Bleaching is known to occur in nearly every anemone species used by clownfish and can affect them over a large scale. A 2008 study concluded that anemone bleaching has led to lower numbers of clownfish in Great Keppel Island, off Queensland, Australia. In one area off Sesoko Island, Japan, during the 1997–98 El Niño event the local sebae anemones bleached and disappeared leading to the extirpation of the pink skunk clownfish population. Another study found that Barrier Reef anemonefish can help their hosts better recover from bleaching. A warmer ocean could also lead to a delay in the development and settling of larvae, increase their need to forage, as well as a decreased reproduction. Conversely, a 2015 study suggested that warmer water can increase aerobic exercise in maroon clownfish juveniles. The orange clownfish appears to adapt to warmer waters by growing smaller.

There is evidence that ocean acidification negatively impacts clownfish larvae's sense of smell and hearing, which consequently reduces their ability to find reefs and anemones and increases predation risk. Conversely, a 2013 study found that higher levels of carbon dioxide in the waters increased fecundity in adults, but also led to smaller yolks for larvae. In addition, acidification can negatively affect the quality of larvae when combined with warmer temperatures.

Wild clownfish are commonly collected to supply the aquarium trade. Factors that contribute to this include their popularity, market value, and ease of capture, particularly due to their shallow water habitat. A 2005 study of an area in the Philippines found that clownfish and anemones were subject to overfishing, being 60 percent of total catch for ornamental display; clownfish in particular decreased in population density by 80 percent. A 2014 study also concluded that exploitation has led to a decrease in ocellaris clownfish and associated anemones around the Spermonde Archipelago, Indonesia. In 2019, Frisch and colleagues found that during a pause on collecting in Keppel Islands, Australia, the recovery rate for clownfish species was relatively slow over a ten-year period. Urban development along the coast can affect clownfish habitat via increased sedimentation, algae growth and dredging. Sedimentation in particular appears have negative effects on larval development, gill function and anti-predator behaviour. Declines in the numbers of certain clownfish species and their anemones hosts have been linked to coastal development in certain areas.

The establishment of marine protected areas has benefited clownfish due to prohibition on collecting, as they appear to be more numerous in these areas. Protected areas are particularly important for protecting biodiversity hotspots where multiple clownfish species live, such as Solitary Islands Marine Park, Australia. Marine parks are important for protecting endemic species, but do not appear to speed up the recovery of species that have had wide-ranging declines.
