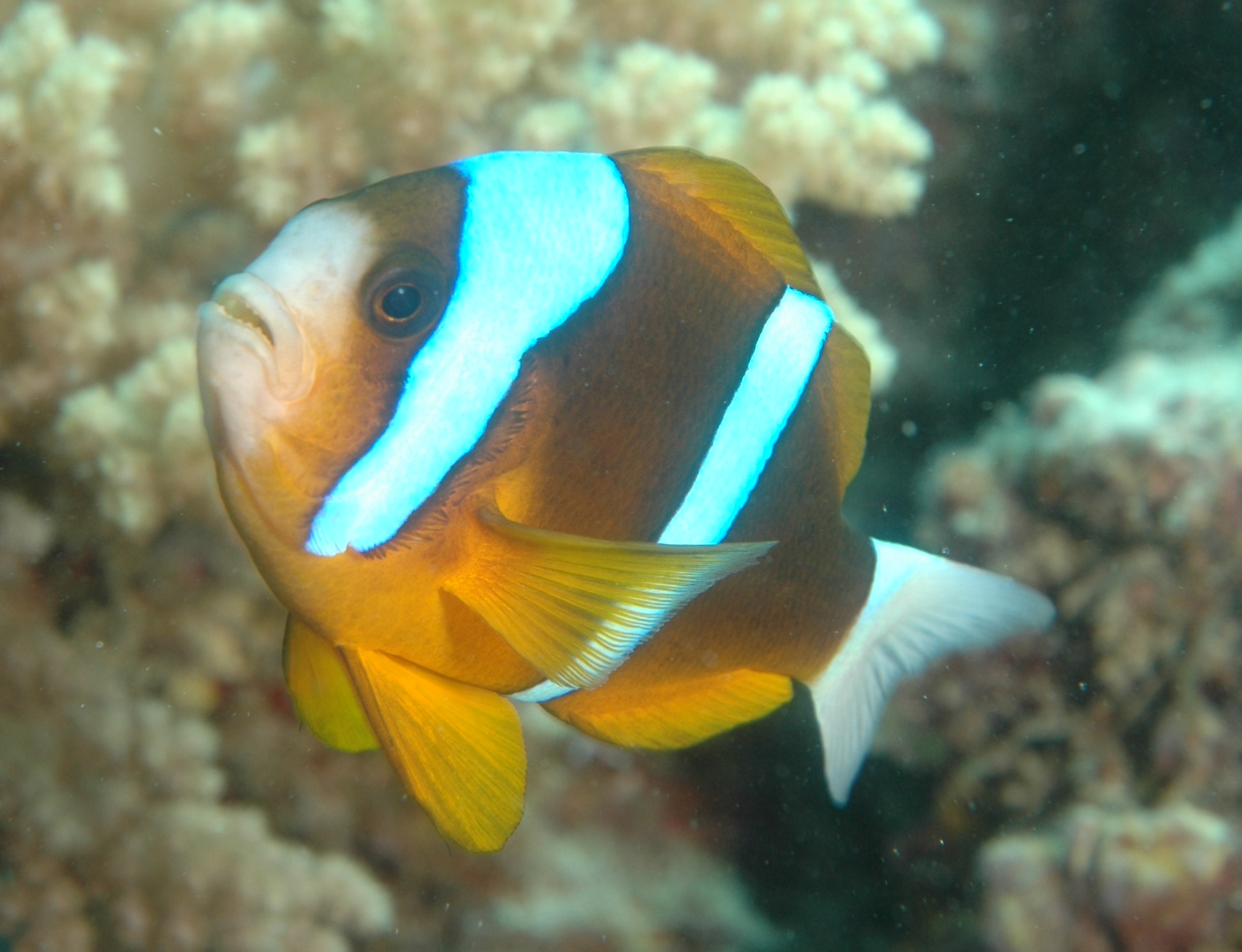

Conservation status
- Least Concern (IUCN 3.1)

Scientific classification
- Kingdom: Animalia
- Phylum: Chordata
- Class: Actinopterygii
- Division: Teleostei
- Order: Blenniiformes
- Family: Pomacentridae
- Genus: Amphiprion
- Species: A. akindynos

Binomial name
- Amphiprion akindynos Allen, 1972

= Amphiprion akindynos =

Species of fish

Amphiprion akindynos, the Barrier Reef anemonefish, is a species of anemonefish that is principally found in the Great Barrier Reef of Australia, but also in nearby locations in the Western Pacific. The species name 'akindynos' is Greek, meaning 'safe' or 'without danger' in reference to the safety afforded amongst the tentacles of its host anemone. Like all anemonefishes it forms a symbiotic mutualism with sea anemones and is unaffected by the stinging tentacles of the host anemone. It is a sequential hermaphrodite with a strict size-based dominance hierarchy: the female is largest, the breeding male is second largest, and the male non-breeders get progressively smaller as the hierarchy descends. They exhibit protandry, meaning the breeding male will change to female if the sole breeding female dies, with the largest non-breeder becomes the breeding male. The fish's natural diet includes zooplankton.

== Description ==
Adults are an orange-brown colour with two white bars with black edging encircling the body. The first bar is located on the head behind the eyes and may be thin and broken. The second bar is on the body below the dorsal fin. The caudal peduncle and caudal fin are white. Juveniles are normally brown with three white stripes. In sub-adults the colouring changes to a dull yellow with two white stripes. They have 10 to 11 dorsal spines and 2 anal spines. They reach a maximum length of 12–13 cm (4.7–5.1 in).

=== Colour variations ===
Some anemonefish species have colour variations based on geographic location, sex and host anemone. A. akindynos does not show any of these variations.

=== Similar species ===
The white bars on A. akindynos are generally narrower than A. clarkii and lacks the abrupt transition between the body colour and white caudal fin. A. clarkii may have a yellow caudal fin. Adult A. chrysopterus are darker while the head bar is broader and not constricted or discontinuous. Traditionally A. akindynos was included in the clarkii complex, however genetic analysis has shown that it is significantly different from any of the other species in the clarkii complex and instead is part of a clade with A. mccullochi. Further study suggested an evolutionary connectivity among between samples of A. akindynos and A. mccullochi. Historical hybridization and introgression in the evolutionary past resulted in a complex mitochondrial DNA structure. There were two evolutionary groups with individuals of both species detected in both, thus the species lacked reciprocal monophyly. There were no shared haplotypes between species.

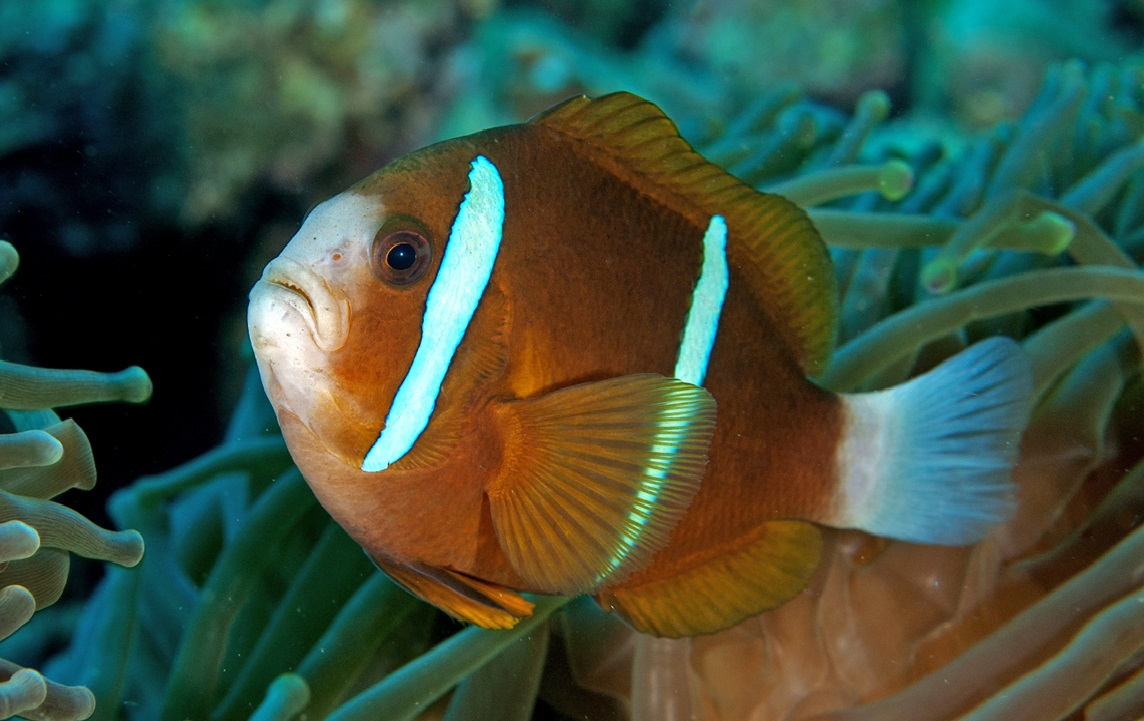
A. akindynos (Barrier Reef anemonefish)

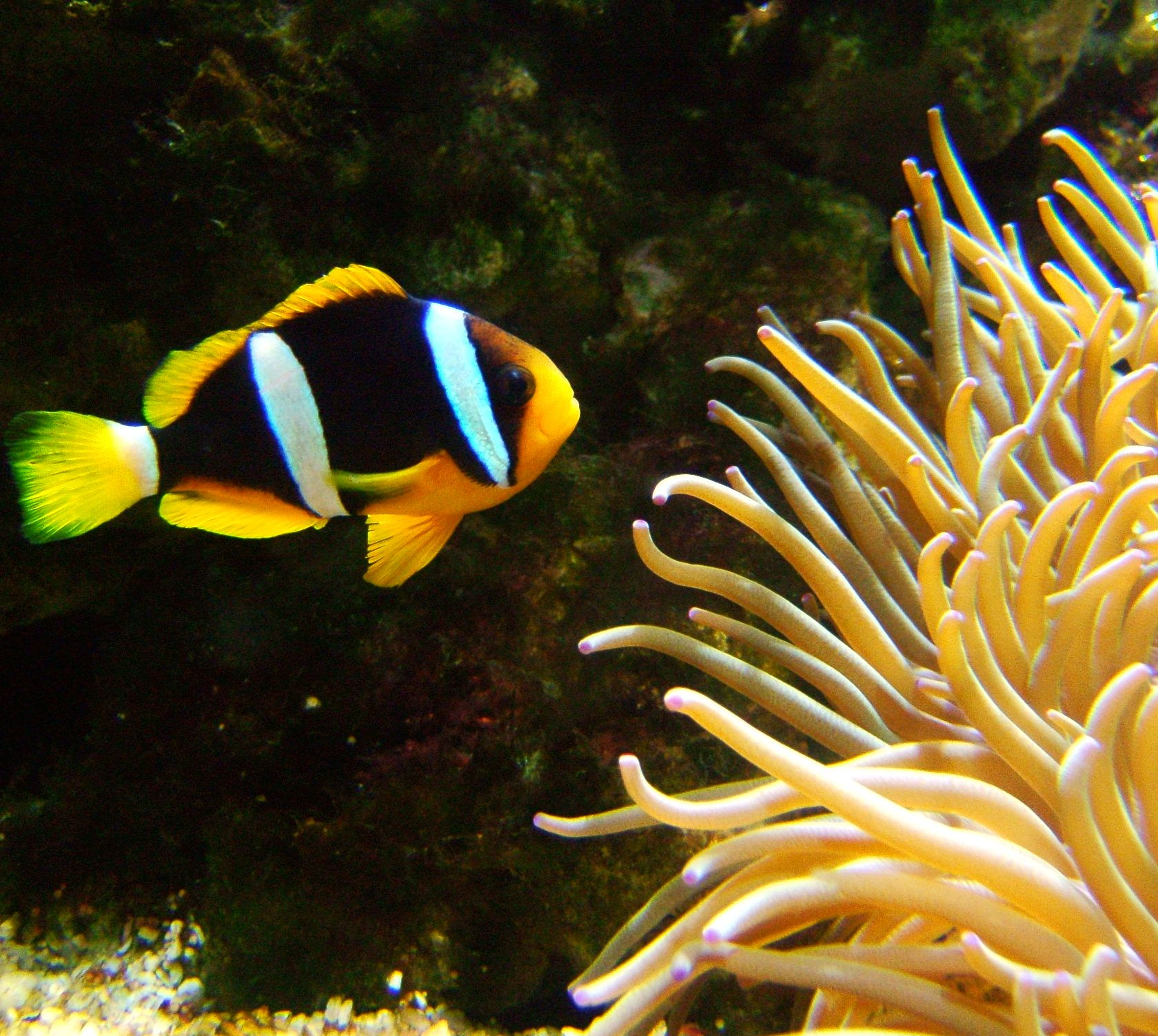
A. clarkii (Clark's anemonefish)

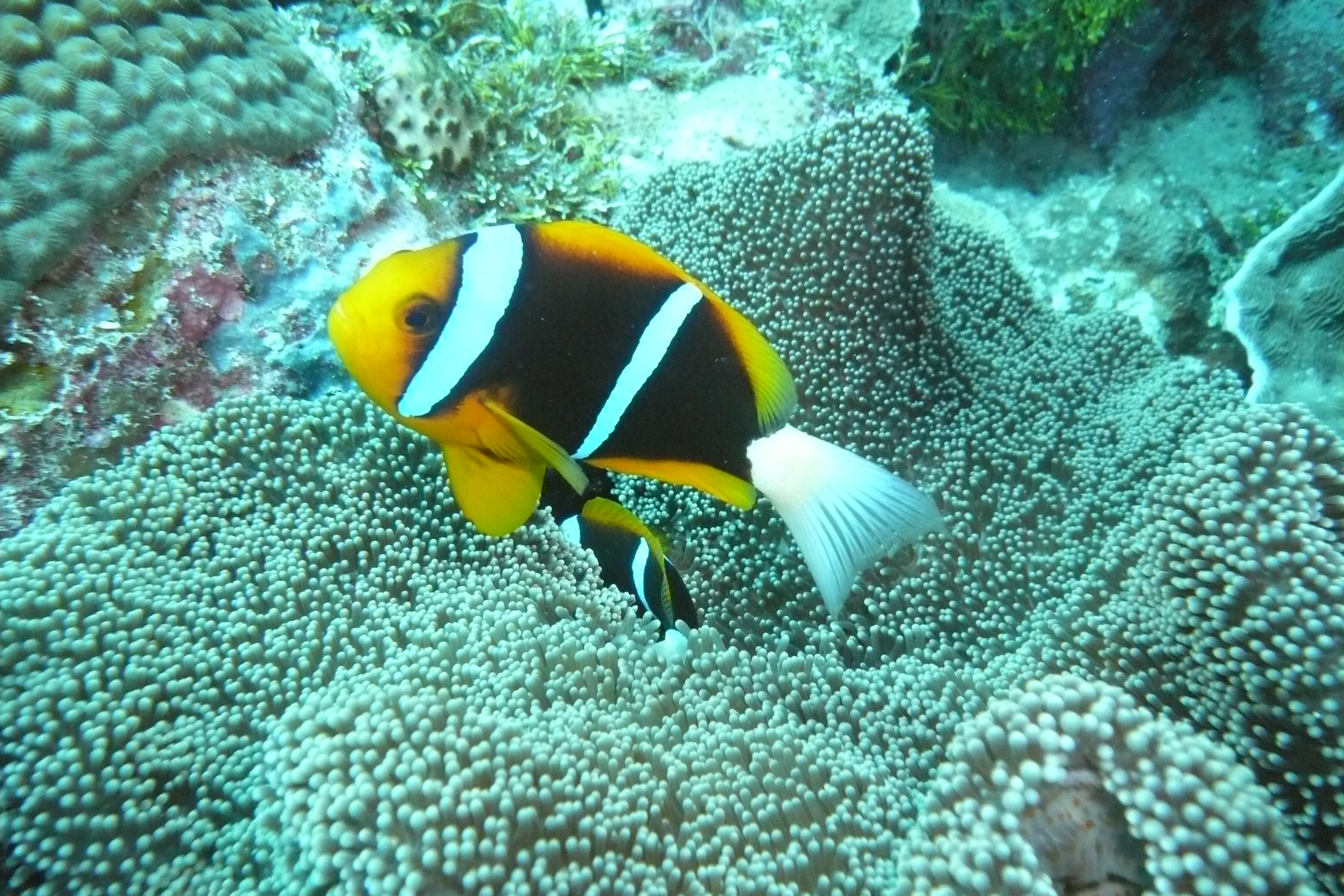
A. chrysopterus (Orange-fin anemonefish), Palau

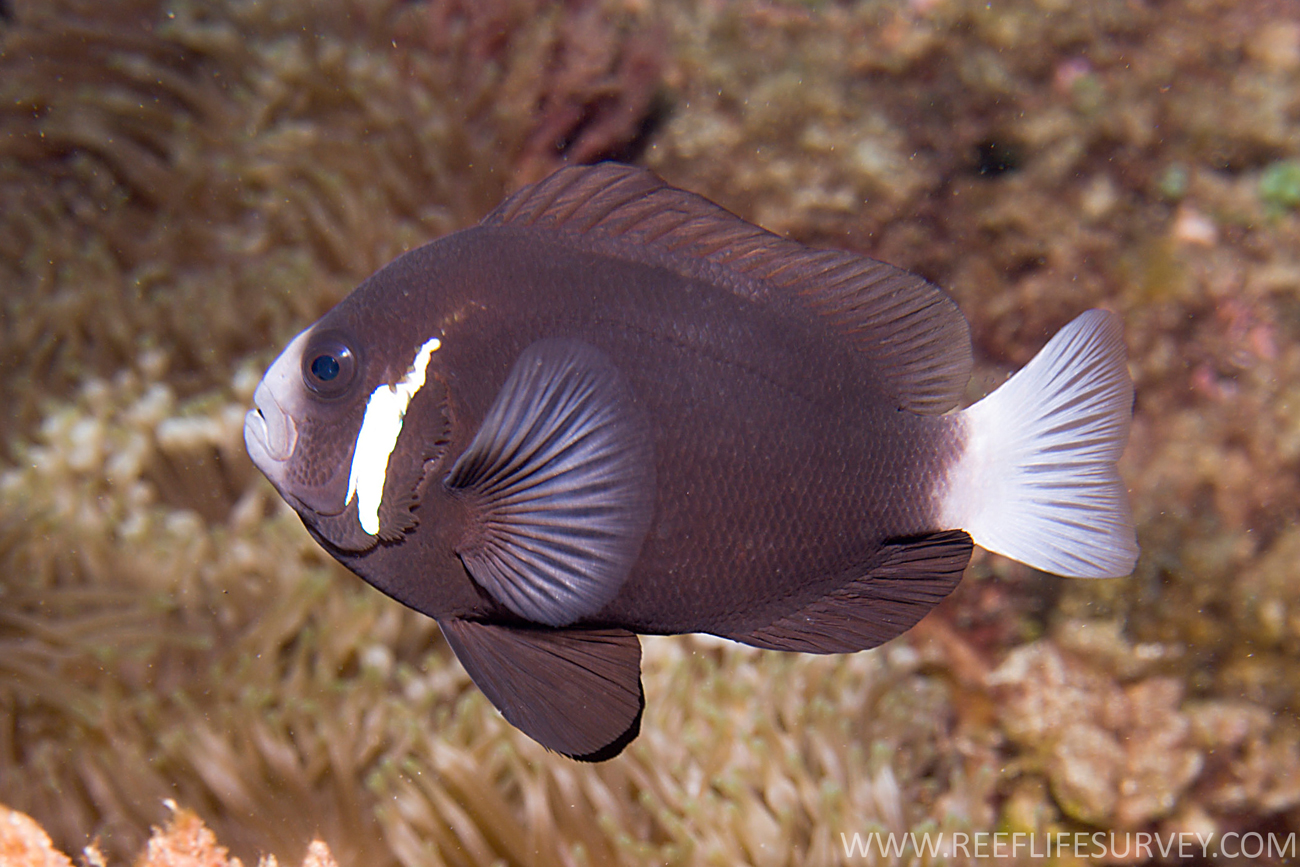
The genetically related A. mccullochi

== Distribution and habitat ==
The Barrier Reef anemonefish is found in lagoons and outer reefs in the Great Barrier Reef, Coral Sea, northern New South Wales, New Caledonia, the Loyalty Islands and Tonga. A. akindynos has been thought to be limited to depths of less than 25 m, however surveys using autonomous underwater vehicles of mesophotic reefs at Viper Reef and Hydrographers Passage in the central Great Barrier Reef observed A. akindynos at depths between 50 and 65 m.

=== Host anemones ===
The relationship between anemonefish and their host sea anemones is not random and instead is highly nested in structure. A. akindynos is a generalist, being hosted by the following 6 out of the 10 host anemones:

- Entacmaea quadricolor Bubble-tip anemone
- Heteractis aurora beaded sea anemone
- Heteractis crispa Sebae anemone
- Heteractis magnifica magnificent sea anemone
- Stichodactyla haddoni
- Stichodactyla mertensii Mertens' carpet sea anemone

== Reproduction ==
The Barrier Reef anemonefish is a nesting fish. A few days before mating, aggression from the dominant male towards the female increases, and at the same time he begins clearing a nest site, usually on a rock close to the host anemone. The rock is cleaned of algae, sometimes with the assistance of the female. When spawning takes place the female zig-zags over the nest site and the male follows fertilizing the eggs which have been deposited. Between 100 and 1000 elliptical eggs of between 3 and 4 mm in length may be laid. They are attached to the nest site by a mass of short filaments. The male guards and aerates the eggs for 6 to 7 days until they hatch. The larvae are then dispersed by currents and swimming. Larvae mortality is high, with most of the surviving larvae settling on the original reef.

== Diet ==
The diet of the Barrier Reef anemonefish consists primarily of algae (seaweeds) and zooplankton. The dominant pair in the social hierarchy tend to travel farther from the host anemone in order to find food. The host anemone may benefit from small pieces of food which the anemonefish drop when feeding.

== Conservation status ==
Anemonefish and their host anemones are found on coral reefs and face similar environmental issues. Like corals, anemone's contain intracellular endosymbionts, zooxanthellae, and can suffer from bleaching due to triggers such as increased water temperature or acidification. The other threat to anemonefish is collection for the marine aquarium trade. The Great Barrier Reef Marine Park Authority manages collection by zoning reefs as open or closed and normally a breeding pair of adults or sub-adults is removed, leaving at least one anemonefish behind. While bleaching was found to be a cause of anemone and anemonefish decline in the Keppel Islands, anemones and anemonefish were still present on bleached reefs in the closed zones however they were absent from bleached reefs in the open zones, suggesting that collection compounds the impact of bleaching. A survey published in 2014 found 58% of sites surveyed on the Great Barrier Reef did not have anemones or anemonefishes, and at sites where they were present, numbers were generally low and suggested that current regulations may not be sufficient to prevent localised extinctions nor to ensure that reproductive success is not adversely impacted. This species was not evaluated in the 2012 release of the IUCN Red List.

== Aquatic emblem ==
The Barrier Reef anemonefish was officially named as the state aquatic emblem of Queensland in March, 2005.. The idea to identify an Aquatic Emblem originated from Dr Adam Smith and the Australian Underwater Federation, the peak group representing divers
