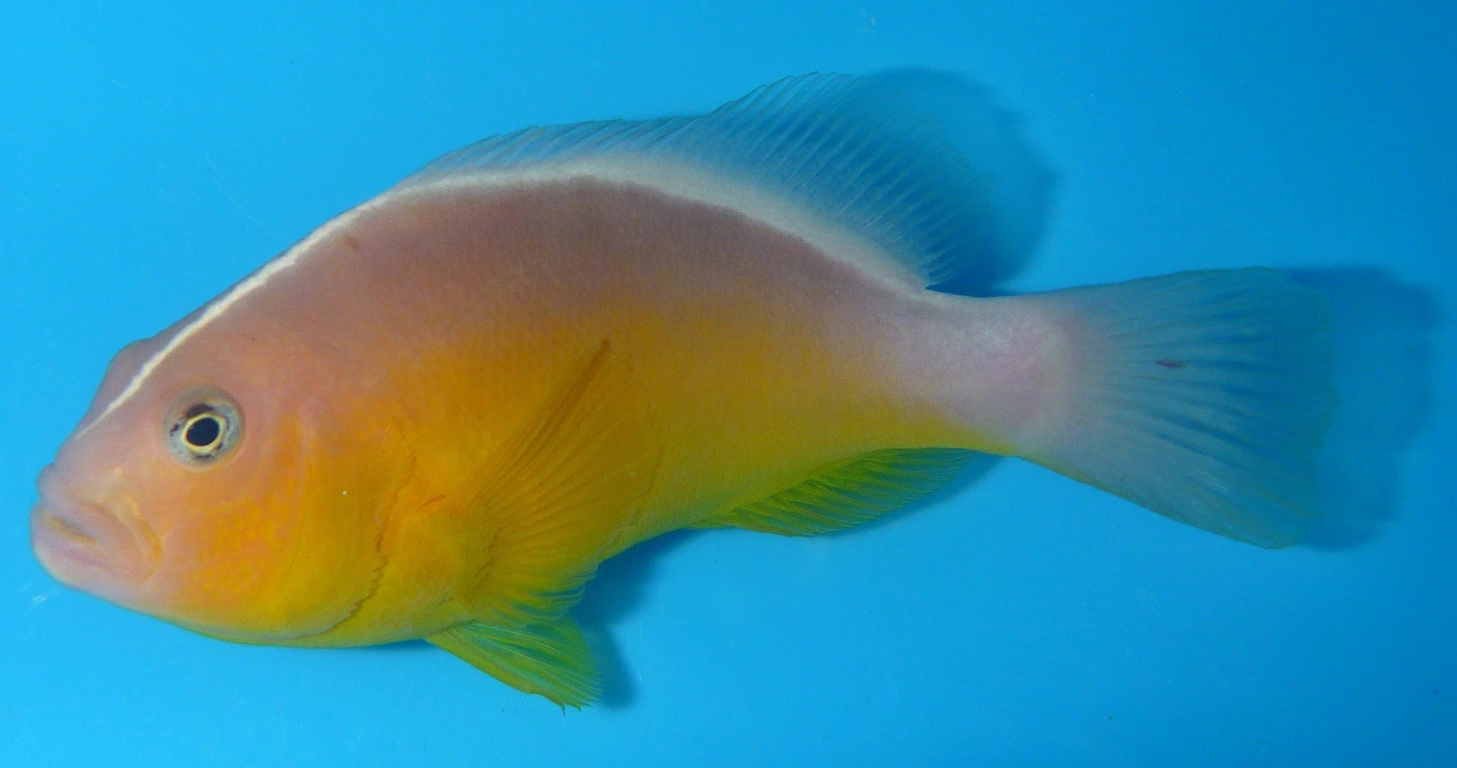

Scientific classification
- Kingdom: Animalia
- Phylum: Chordata
- Class: Actinopterygii
- Division: Teleostei
- Order: Blenniiformes
- Family: Pomacentridae
- Genus: Amphiprion
- Species: A. pacificus

Binomial name
- Amphiprion pacificus Allen Drew & Fenner, 2010

= Amphiprion pacificus =

Species of fish

Amphiprion pacificus, is a species of anemonefish found in the western Pacific Ocean. Like all anemonefishes it forms a symbiotic mutualism with sea anemones and is unaffected by the stinging tentacles of the host anemone. It is a sequential hermaphrodite with a strict sized based dominance hierarchy: the female is largest, the breeding male is second largest, and the male non-breeders get progressively smaller as the hierarchy descends. They exhibit protandry, meaning the breeding male will change to female if the sole breeding female dies, with the largest non-breeder becomes the breeding male. The fish's natural diet includes zooplankton.

== Description ==
The body of A. pacificus is pinkish brown dark brown, usually grading to yellowish or orange on lower side of body including abdomen. It is a member of the skunk complex with the characteristic white stripe along the dorsal ridge line, from the midline of the snout through to the base of caudal fin. The fins are whitish to semi-translucent. It has 9 dorsal spines, 2 anal spines, 18-20 dorsal soft rays and 12-13 anal soft rays. The four specimens that were the basis of the description ranged from 3.09 to 4.83 cm (1 1/4 to 2 in).

=== Color variations ===
Some anemonefish species have color variations based on geographic location, sex and host anemone. A. pacificus, like other members of the skunk complex does not show any of these variations.

=== Similar species ===
A. akallopisos is almost identical, however there is a wide geographic separation such that geographic location is the easiest distinction. Despite the similarity in appearance, genetic results indicate that A. pacificus is well differentiated from A. akallopisos and is more closely related to A. sandaracinos which has a uniform coloration and the white stripe on the dorsal ridge extends onto the superior lip. 3 other species of anemonefish are found within its range, A. barberi, A. chrysopterus and A. clarkii, however these are easily distinguished by the absence of the white stripe on the dorsal ridge.

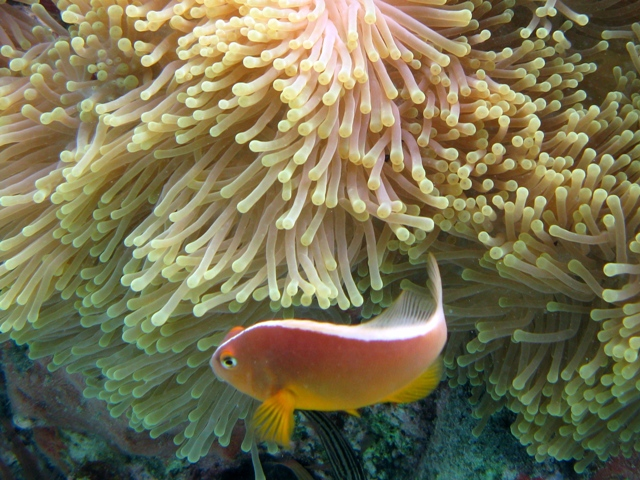
A. akallopisos (Skunk anemonefish)

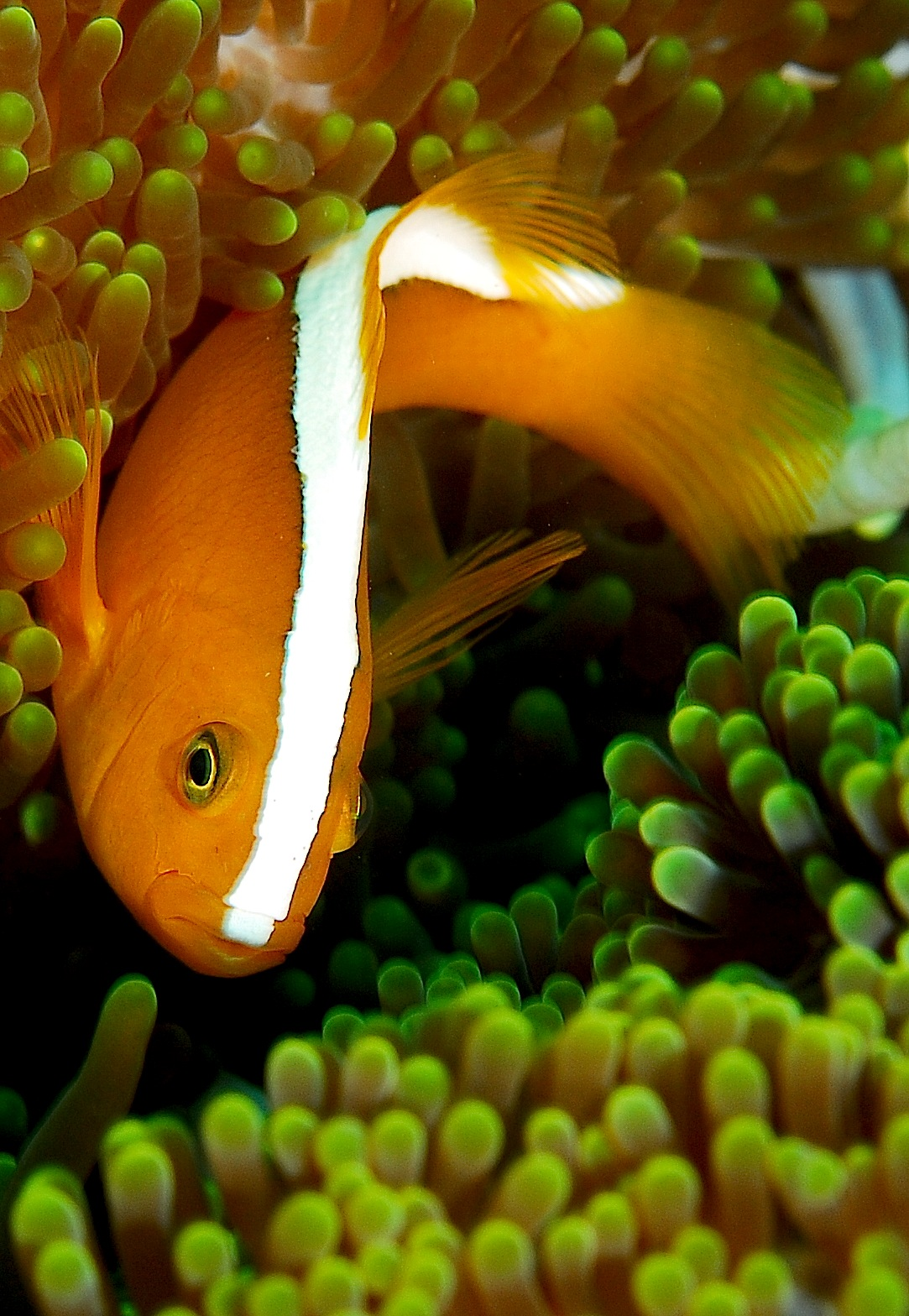
A. sandaracinos (Orange anemonefish) showing the broader white stripe extending to the upper lip.

== Distribution and habitat ==
A. pacificus is found the western Pacific at Wallis Island, Tonga, Fiji and Samoan Islands, a regional hotspot of endemism. It is not common within its range and is generally found at depths of 4 to 10 metres (13 to 33 ft).

=== Host anemones ===
The relationship between anemonefish and their host sea anemones is not random and instead is highly nested in structure. A. pacificus is highly specialised, being hosted by only 1 out of the 6 host anemones found in the region. A. pacificus is hosted by the following species of anemone:

- Heteractis magnifica magnificent sea anemone

== Conservation status ==
Anemonefish and their host anemones are found on coral reefs and face similar environmental issues. Like corals, anemone's contain intracellular endosymbionts, zooxanthellae, and can suffer from bleaching due to triggers such as increased water temperature or acidification. Characteristics known to elevate the risk of extinction are small geographic range, small local population and extreme habitat specialisation. A. pacificus has each of these characteristics, being an endemic species, with small local population and only one host anemone suggest that it is of particular conservation concern. This species was not evaluated in the 2012 release of the IUCN Red List.
