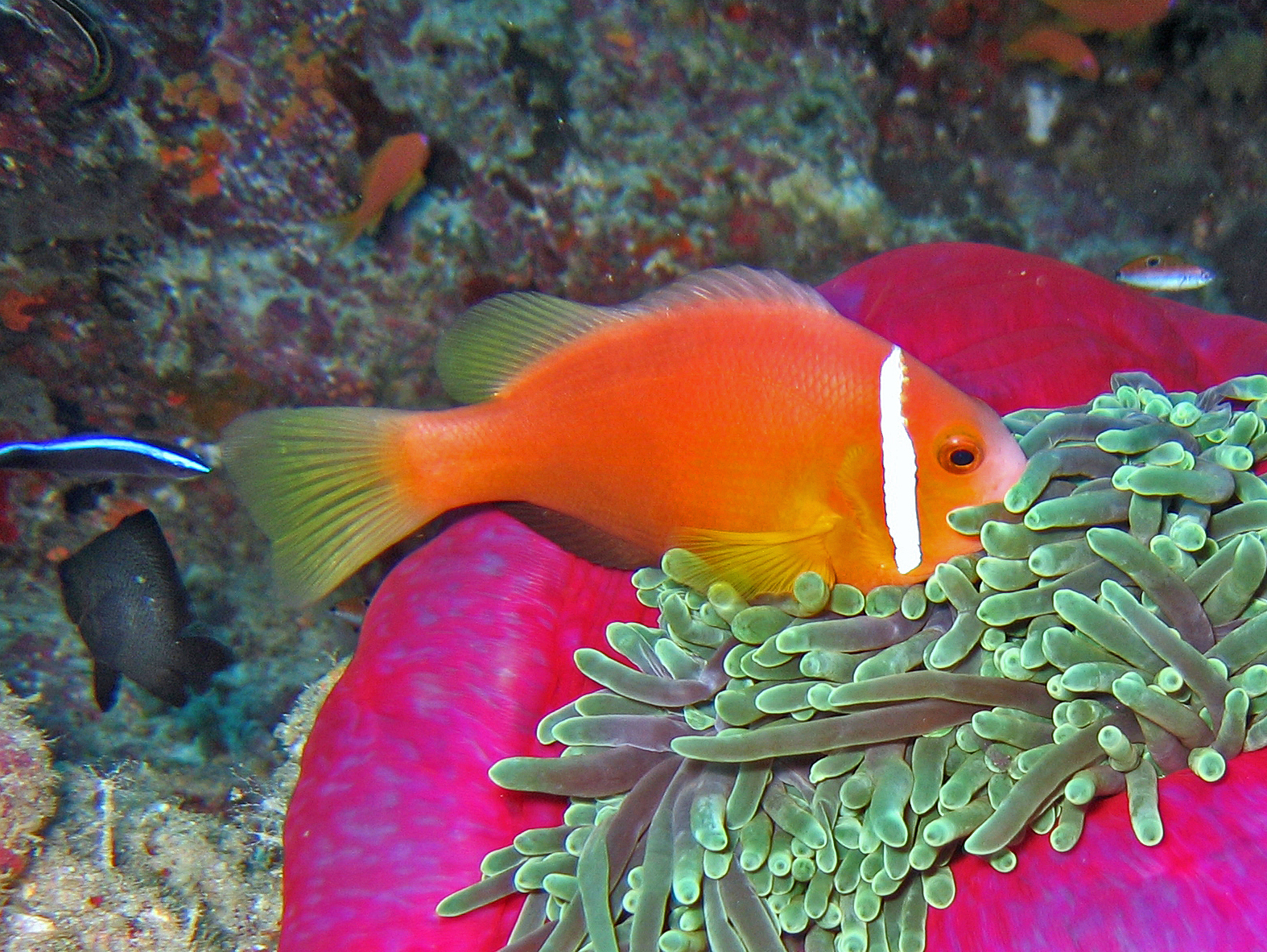
- Amphiprion nigripes on the sea anemone Heteractis magnifica

Conservation status
- Least Concern (IUCN 3.1)

Scientific classification
- Kingdom: Animalia
- Phylum: Chordata
- Class: Actinopterygii
- Order: Blenniiformes
- Family: Pomacentridae
- Genus: Amphiprion
- Species: A. nigripes

Binomial name
- Amphiprion nigripes Regan, 1908

= Amphiprion nigripes =

Species of fish

Amphiprion nigripes (Maldive anemonefish or blackfinned anemonefish), is a marine fish belonging to the family Pomacentridae, which includes clownfishes and damselfishes.

== Description ==
The Maldive anemonefish is a small fish which grows up to 11 cm as a female and 8 cm as a male. It is oval-bodied and laterally compressed.

This clownfish is characterized by its rusty orange color with a single white stripe running vertically just behind the eye. It has black pelvic and anal fins (hence the common name) and a variable area on its belly can be more or less black. Depending on geographic location, some fishes can be orangeish-yellow with an anal fin which is not black but the same color as the body.

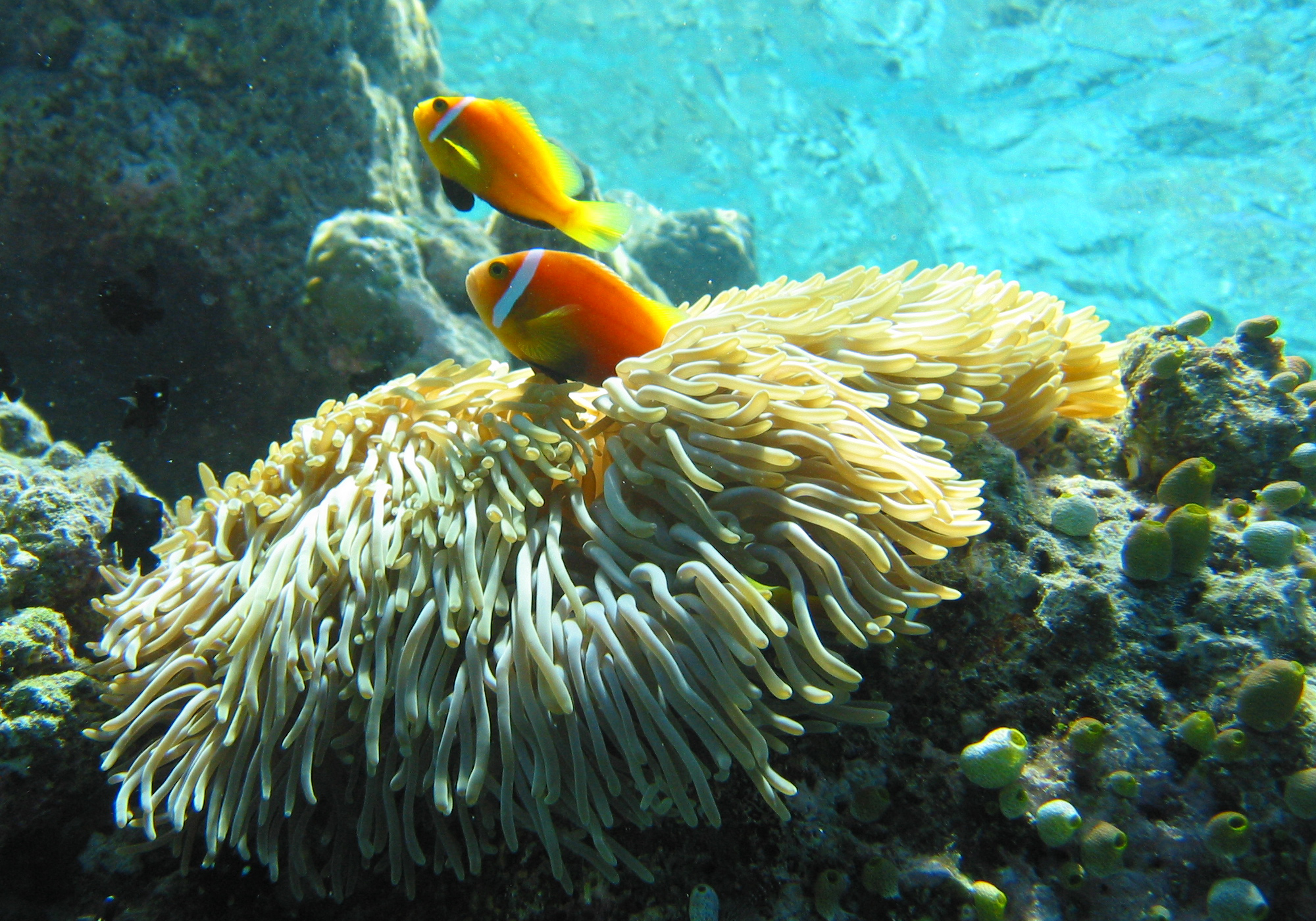
Blackfinned anemonefish in Fihalhohi, Maldives

== Distribution ==
The Maldive anemonefish is found in the western Indian Ocean in the Maldive Islands, Laccadive Islands.

== Habitat ==
This species typically lives in small groups on outer reef slopes at depths of 2–25 m (6 ft 7 in – 82 ft 0 in). It is particularly associated with the magnificent sea anemone.

== Feeding ==
This anemonefish is omnivorous, and its diet is based on zooplankton, small benthic crustaceans, and algae.

== Behaviour ==
Amphiprion nigripes is active during the day. It is a protandrous hermaphrodite, which means all fish are hatched as males and later can change sex to female. The males live in harems in which an established dominance hierarchy manages the group and keeps individuals at a specific social rank. It also aggressively defends its territory and is completely dependent on its sea anemone, which represents its "life insurance" as a safe shelter for the group and for the nest. The associative relationship that binds the clownfish and the sea anemone is called mutualism. The fish lives within the sea anemone's tentacles and can use it as a shelter because it has developed a thin layer of mucus which covers its body as a protection against the anemone's stinging tentacles, and the presence of the clownfish can be interpreted as a lure to attract potential anemone prey close to its tentacles; the clownfish can also defend the anemone against some reef fishes which could eat the tentacles, such as butterflyfish.

=== In captivity ===
In a tank, the species can eat brine shrimp, mysis shrimp, and chopped shellfish provided by a hobbyist. Individuals that are tank-raised have accepted high-protein flakes as well as granular foods. The maldive anemonefish is considered mostly peaceful in an aquarium, with some aggression when defending its host. It has successfully been raised in captivity.

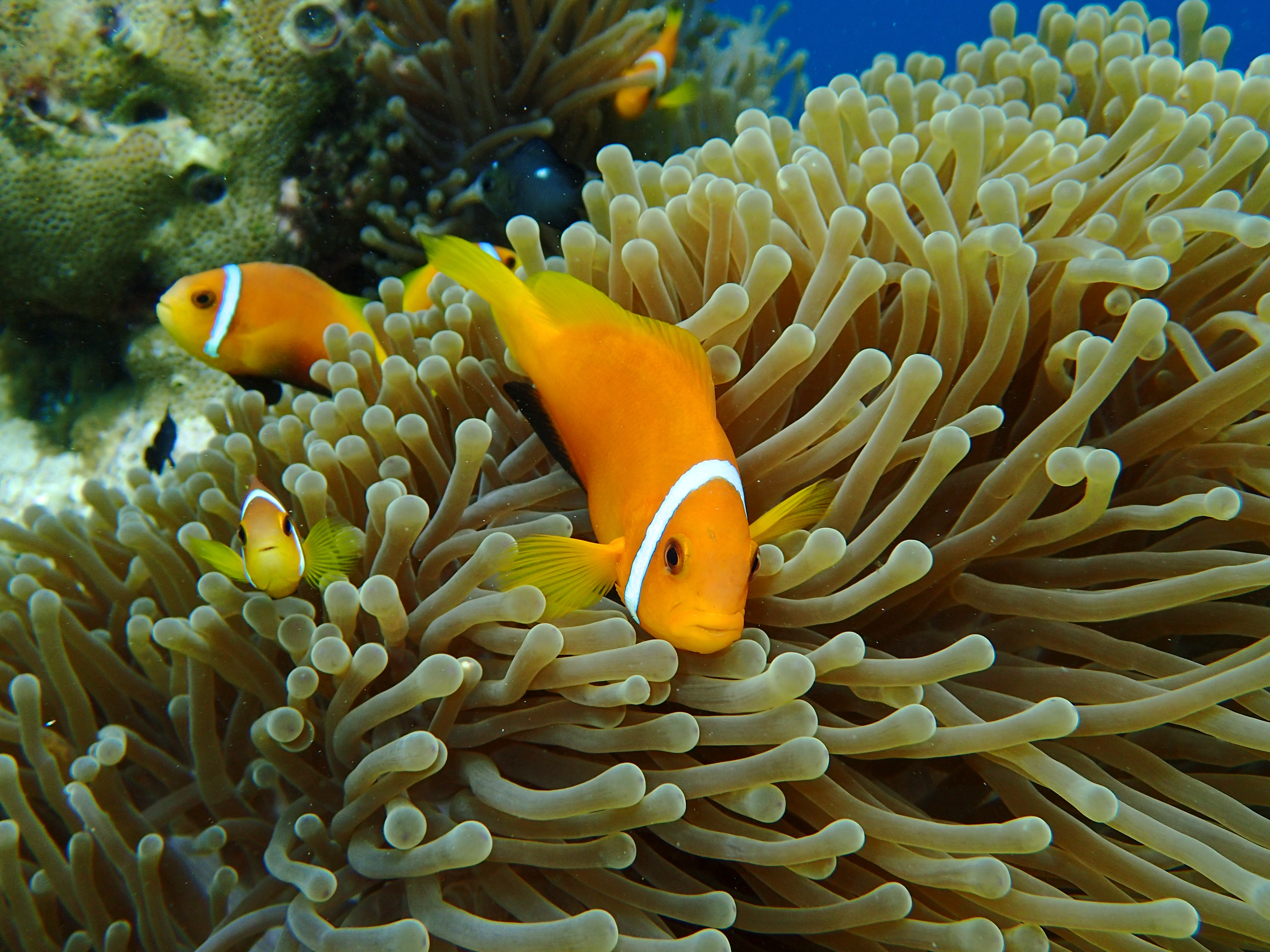
Amphiprion Nigripes with their anemone in Vilamendhoo Maldives

== Bibliography ==
- Allen, G.R. 1975. The anemone fishes. Their classification and biology. Segona edició. T.F.H. Publications, Inc., Neptune City, New Jersey.
- Allen, G.R. 1984. Pomacentridae. A W. Fischer i G. Bianchi (eds.) FAO species identification sheets for fishery purposes. Western Indian Ocean (Fishing Area 51). volum 3. [var. pag.]. FAO, Rome.
- Allen, G.R. 1991. Damselfishes of the world. Mergus Publishers, Melle, Germany. 271 p.
- Balon, E.K. 1990. Epigenesis of an epigeneticist: the development of some alternative concepts on the early ontogeny and evolution of fishes. Guelph Ichthyol. Rev. 1:1-48.
- Eschmeyer, William N.: Genera of Recent Fishes. California Academy of Sciences. San Francisco, California, United States. iii + 697. ISBN 0-940228-23-8. Any 1990.
- Eschmeyer, William N., ed. 1998. Catalog of Fishes. Special Publication of the Center for Biodiversity Research and Information, núm. 1, vol. 1-3. California Academy of Sciences. San Francisco, California, United States. 2905. ISBN 0-940228-47-5.
- Hardy, J.D. Jr. 2003. Coral reef fish species. NOAA\National Oceanographic Data Center. NODC Coral Reef Data and Information Management System. United States. 537 p.
- Helfman, G., B. Collette i D. Facey: The Diversity of Fishes. Blackwell Science, Malden, Massachusetts, United States, 1997. ISBN 1-4051-2494-6.
- Jonklaas, R. 1975. Collecting marine tropicals. T.F.H. Publications, Neptune City, United States. 224 p.
- Kapoor, D., R. Dayal i A.G. Ponniah 2002. Fish biodiversity of India. National Bureau of Fish Genetic Resources Lucknow, India.775 p.
- Masuda, H. i G.R. Allen 1993. Meeresfische der Welt - Groß-Indopazifische Region. Tetra Verlag, Herrenteich, Melle. 528 p.
- Moe, A.M. Jr. 1992. The marine aquarium handbook. Beginner to breeder. Green Turtle Publication, Florida, United States. 318 p.
- Moyle, P. i J. Cech.: Fishes: An Introduction to Ichthyology, Upper Saddle River, New Jersey, United States: Prentice-Hall. Any 2000. ISBN 0-13-011282-8.
- Nelson, J.S. 2006: Fishes of the world. John Wiley & Sons, Inc. Hoboken, New Jersey, United States. 601 p. ISBN 0-471-25031-7.
- Robins, C.R., R.M. Bailey, C.E. Bond, J.R. Brooker, E.A. Lachner, R.N. Lea i W.B. Scott 1991. World fishes important to North Americans. Exclusive of species from the continental waters of the United States and Canada. Am. Fish. Soc. Spec. Publ. (21):243 p.
- Thresher, R.E. 1984. Reproduction in reef fishes. T.F.H. Publications, Inc. Ltd., Neptune City, New Jersey, United States. 399 p.
- Wheeler, A.: The World Encyclopedia of Fishes, London: Macdonald. Any 1985. ISBN 0-356-10715-9.
