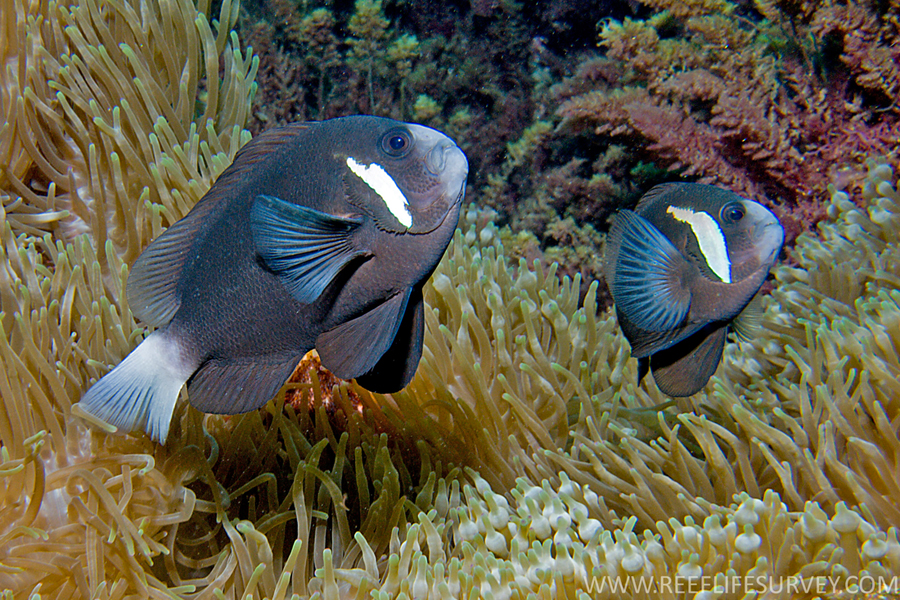

Conservation status
- Vulnerable (IUCN 3.1)

Scientific classification
- Kingdom: Animalia
- Phylum: Chordata
- Class: Actinopterygii
- Division: Teleostei
- Order: Blenniiformes
- Family: Pomacentridae
- Genus: Amphiprion
- Species: A. mccullochi

Binomial name
- Amphiprion mccullochi Whitely 1929

= Amphiprion mccullochi =

Species of fish

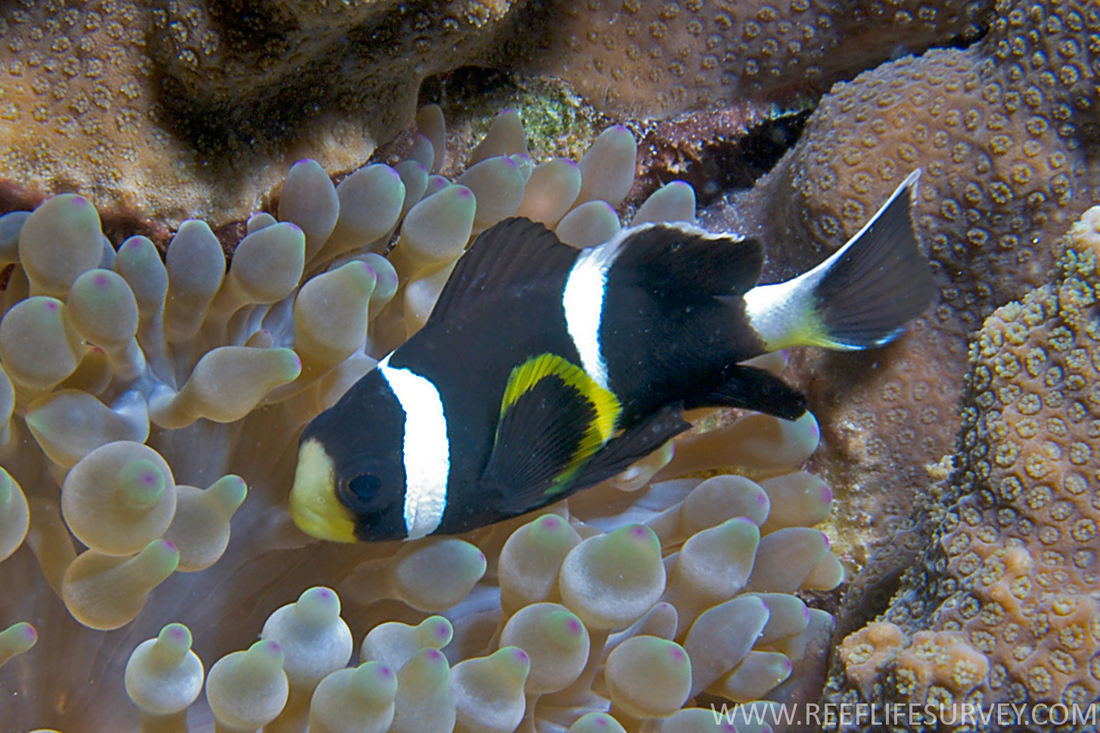
A. mccullochi juvenile on E. quadricolor

Amphiprion mccullochi, also known as whitesnout anemonefish or McCulloch's anemonefish, is a species of anemonefish found in subtropical waters at Lord Howe Island and Norfolk Island.. It was named for Allan McCulloch, a former Curator of Fishes at the Australian Museum, Sydney. Like all anemonefishes it forms a symbiotic mutualism with sea anemones and is unaffected by the stinging tentacles of the host anemone. It is a sequential hermaphrodite with a strict sized based dominance hierarchy: the female is largest, the breeding male is second largest, and the male non-breeders get progressively smaller as the hierarchy descends. They exhibit protandry, meaning the breeding male will change to female if the sole breeding female dies, with the largest non-breeder becomes the breeding male.

== Description ==
A. mccullochi is dark brown with a pale snout, a white bar on each side of the head (but not connected on top of the head) and a pale tail. Juveniles have two white bars and the edge of the pectoral fins is yellow. They have 10 dorsal spines, 2 anal spines, 15-17 dorsal soft rays and 13-14 anal soft rays. They reach a maximum length of 12 cm (4 3/4 in).

=== Color variations ===
Some anemonefish species have color variations based on geographic location, sex and host anemone. A. mccullochi does not show any of these variations.

=== Similar species ===
A. mccullochi is similar in appearance to A. melanopus which is distinguished by its reddish chest, belly and dorsal fin, with a yellowish to slightly red tail. The white bars are also connected over the top of the head. Genetic analysis suggested evolutionary connectivity among samples of A. mccullochi and A. akindynos. Historical hybridization and introgression in the evolutionary past resulted in a complex mitochondrial DNA structure. There were two evolutionary groups with individuals of both species detected in both, thus the species lacked reciprocal monophyly. There were no shared haplotypes between species.

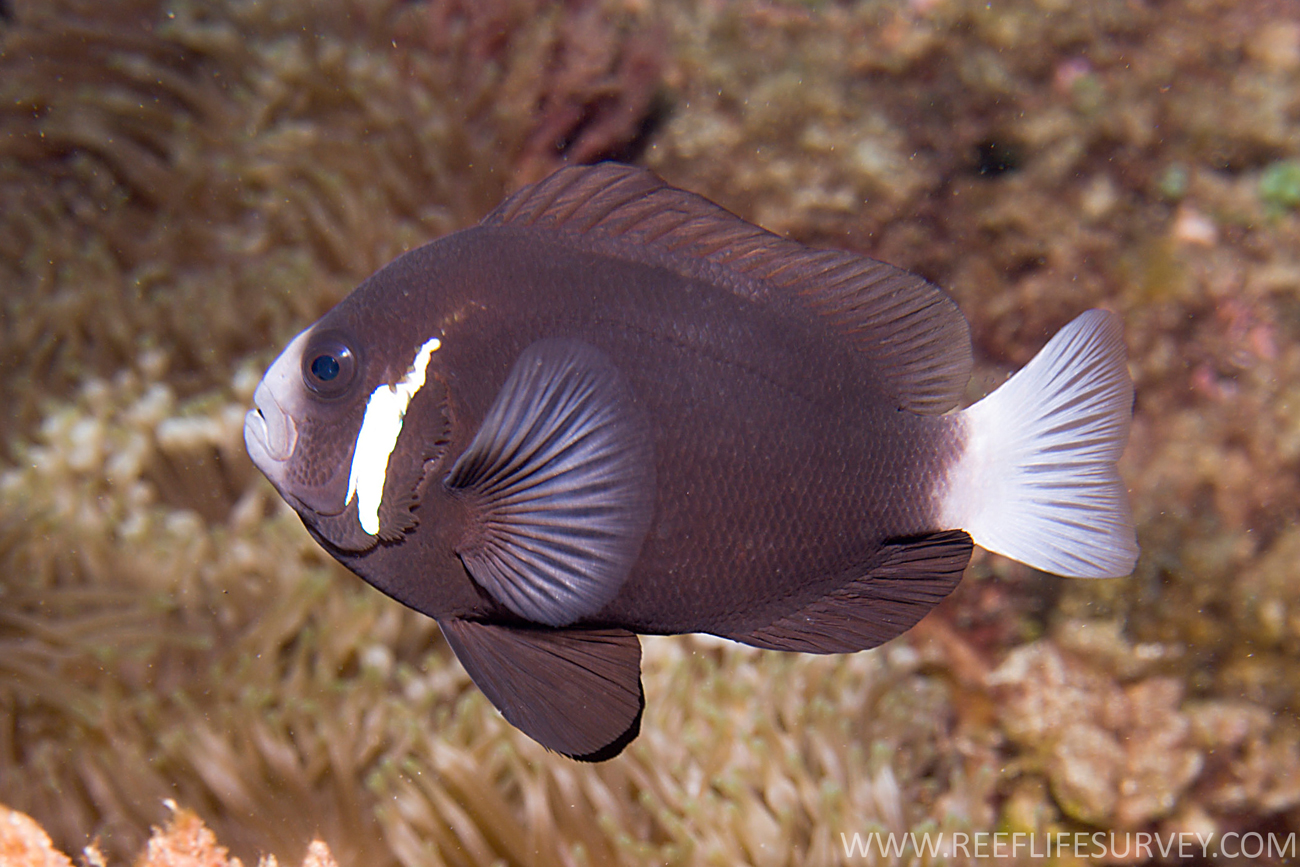
A. mccullochi (Whitesnout anemonefish)

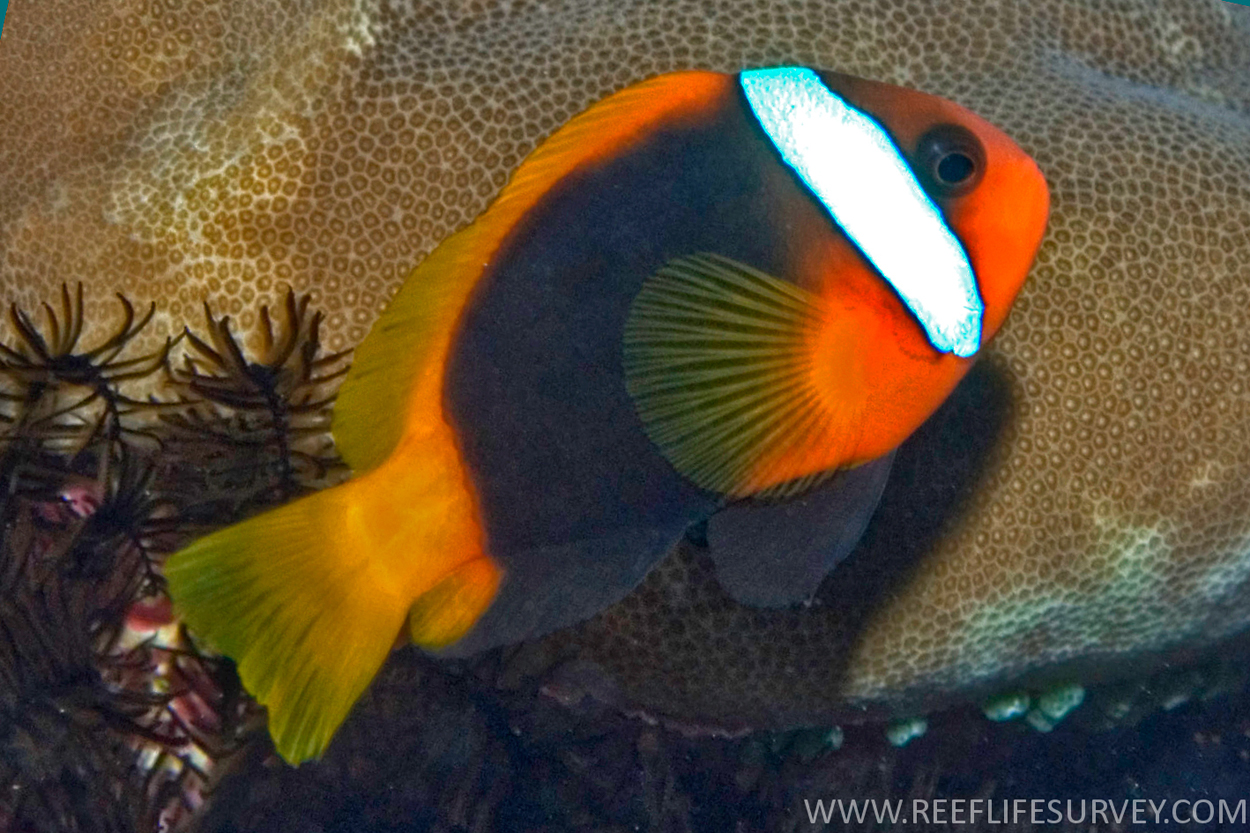
A. melanopus (Red & Black anemonefish)

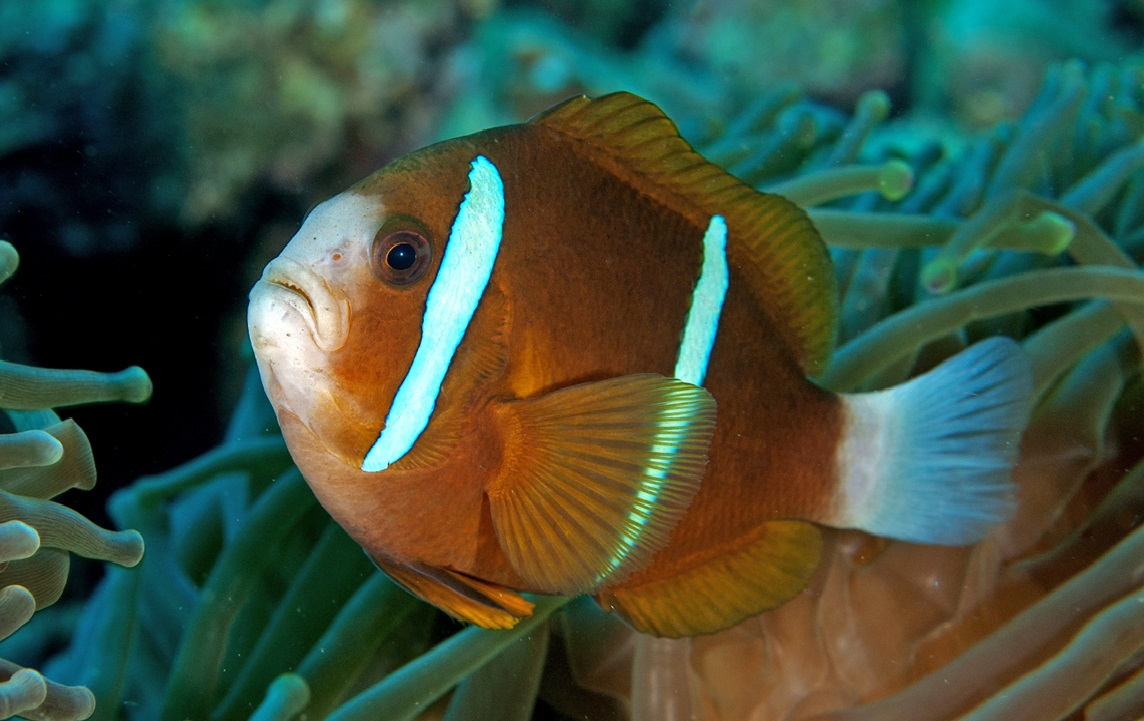
The genetically related A. akindynos (Barrier Reef anemonefish)

== Distribution and habitat ==
A. mccullochi is endemic to the south western Pacific Ocean at Lord Howe Island, Middleton Reef, Elizabeth Reef and Norfolk Island.

=== Host anemones ===
The relationship between anemonefish and their host sea anemones is not random and instead is highly nested in structure. A. mccullochi is highly specialised, being hosted with only 1 species of anemone:

- Entacmaea quadricolor Bubble-tip anemone

== Conservation status ==
Anemonefish and their host anemones are found on coral reefs and face similar environmental issues. Like corals, anemone's contain intracellular endosymbionts, zooxanthellae, and can suffer from bleaching due to triggers such as increased water temperature or acidification. Characteristics known to elevate the risk of extinction are small geographic range, small local population and extreme habitat specialisation. The small geographic range, small local population and extreme habitat specialisation (it only associates with Entacmaea quadricolor) are all characteristics known to elevate the risk of extinction making A. mccullochi of particular conservation concern.

As of 2022, A. mccullochi was categorised as Vulnerable on the IUCN Red List. As of 2024 it was listed as Critically Endangered under the Australian EPBC Act.

== Etymology ==
The specific name honours Whitley's colleague, the Australian ichthyologist Allan Riverstone McCulloch (1885-1925) who collected the type specimen.

== In aquaria ==
This species has bred in captivity.
