= Keppel Bay Islands National Park =

National park in Queensland, Australia

- IUCN category II (national park)
- Location within Queensland
- Location: Queensland
- Nearest city: Yeppoon
- Coordinates: 23°02′30″S 150°52′18″E
- Area: 7.20 km^{2} (2.78 sq mi)
- Established: 1994
- Governing body: Queensland Parks and Wildlife Service
- Website: Official website

Keppel Bay Islands are part of both a national park and a scientific national park in Queensland, Australia, respectively 538 km and 518 km northwest of Brisbane. Keppel Bay Islands National Park includes 13 islands, positioned in Keppel Bay, off the coast of Yeppoon and Emu Park on the Capricorn Coast. The largest island in the Keppel Group, Great Keppel Island, is a popular tourist attraction and not part of the national park.

== North Keppel Island ==
From the early 1950s to about 1994, a small resort of about twelve cabins on North Keppel Island was operated by Mr Walls, a former train driver. "Old" Mr Walls was assisted by his daughter, Geraldine, and her husband, who also lived on the island. His son Tim Walls operated the boat service to the island, firstly in a boat called the Somerset, out of Ross Creek, Yeppoon, then in a larger boat called the Keppel Star, out of the Roslyn Bay Boat Harbour.

More recently the island has been run by the Queensland Parks and Wildlife Service.

Camping, reef walking, boating, fishing, wildlife watching, diving and snorkelling are all popular activities within the park.

Konomie Island Environmental Education Centre is operated by the Queensland Department of Education. It runs programs for school groups about the environment of North Keppel Island.

== See also ==
- Protected areas of Queensland
