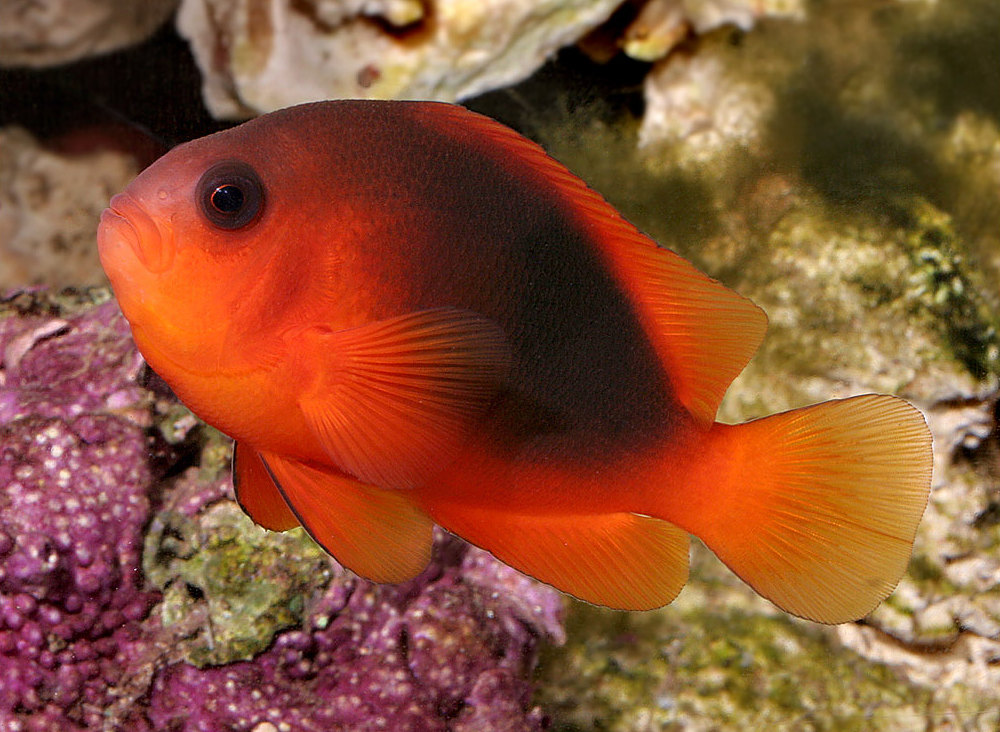

Conservation status
- Least Concern (IUCN 3.1)

Scientific classification
- Kingdom: Animalia
- Phylum: Chordata
- Class: Actinopterygii
- Order: Blenniiformes
- Family: Pomacentridae
- Genus: Amphiprion
- Species: A. ephippium

Binomial name
- Amphiprion ephippium (Bloch, 1790)

Synonyms
- Lutjanus ephippium Bloch, 1790; Amphiprion calliops Schultz, 1966

= Red saddleback anemonefish =

Species of fish

The red saddleback anemonefish, Amphiprion ephippium, also known as the saddle anemonefish, is a marine fish belonging to the family Pomacentridae, the clownfishes and damselfishes.

== Characteristics of Anemonefish ==
Clownfish or anemonefish are fishes that, in the wild, form symbiotic mutualisms with sea anemones and are unaffected by the stinging tentacles of the host anemone, see Amphiprioninae § Mutualism. The sea anemone protects the clownfish from predators, as well as providing food through the scraps left from the anemone's meals and occasional dead anemone tentacles. In return, the clownfish defends the anemone from its predators, and parasites. Clownfish are small-sized, 10–18 centimetres (3.9–7.1 in), and depending on species, they are overall yellow, orange, or reddish or blackish color, and many show white bars or patches. Within species there may be color variations, most commonly according to distribution, but also based on sex, age and host anemone. Clownfish are found in warmer waters of the Indian and Pacific oceans and the Red Sea in sheltered reefs or in shallow lagoons.

In a group of clownfish, there is a strict dominance hierarchy. The largest and most aggressive fish is female and is found at the top. Only two clownfish, a male and a female, in a group reproduce through external fertilization. Clownfish are sequential hermaphrodites, meaning that they develop into males first, and when they mature, they become females.

== Description ==
Adults, as the common name suggests, have a reddish-orange body and a black saddle or spot on the sides. While small juveniles may have 2 or 3 white bars, these are not present in mature fish. They have 10-11 dorsal spines, 2 anal spines, 16-18 dorsal soft rays and 13-14 anal soft rays. They reach a maximum length of 12 cm (4 3/4 in).

=== Color variations ===
None known.

=== Similar species ===
The lack of a white head bar on adults distinguishes A. ephippium from the somewhat similar A. frenatus, A. melanopus, and A. rubrocinctus.

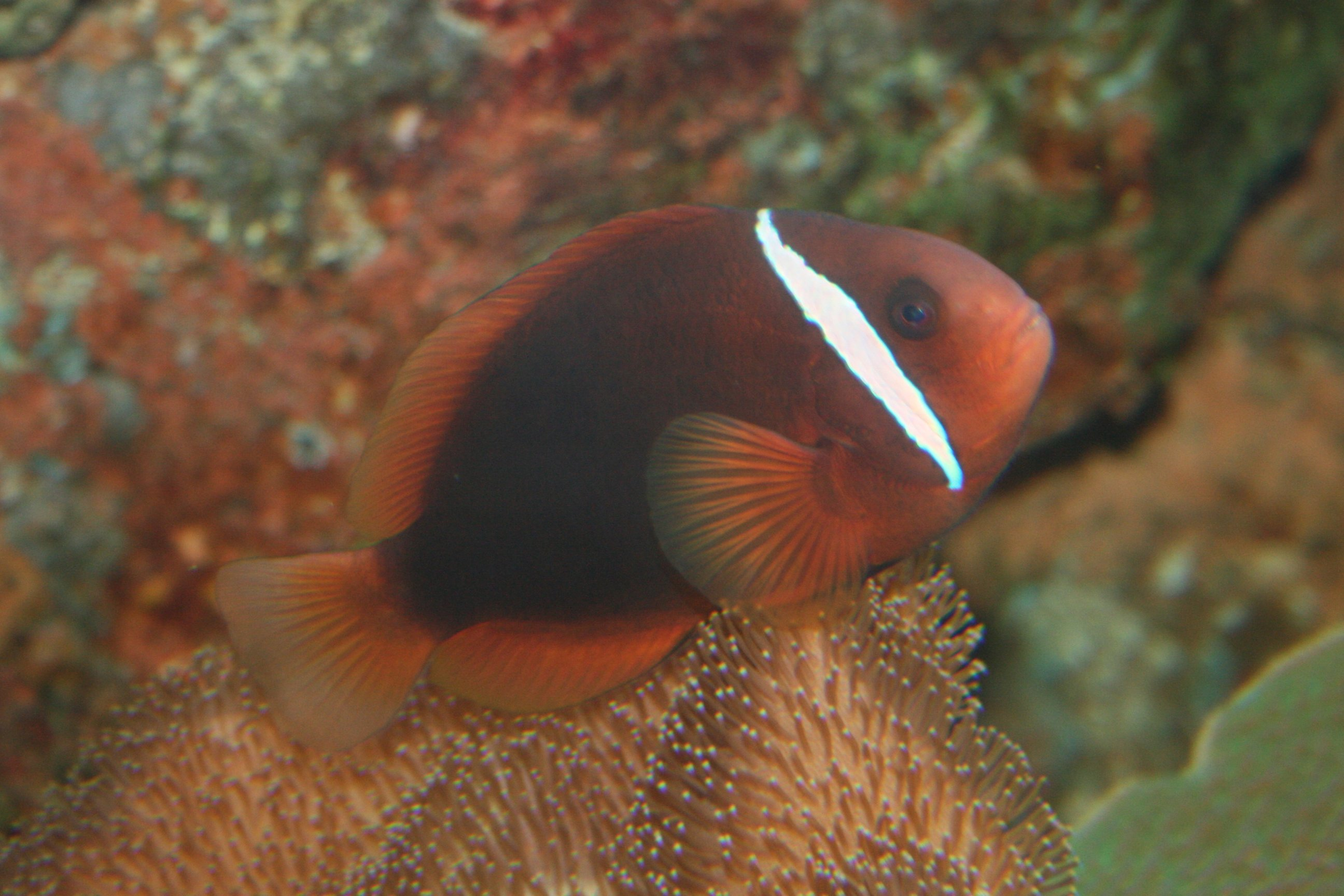
A. frenatus (Tomato anemonefish)

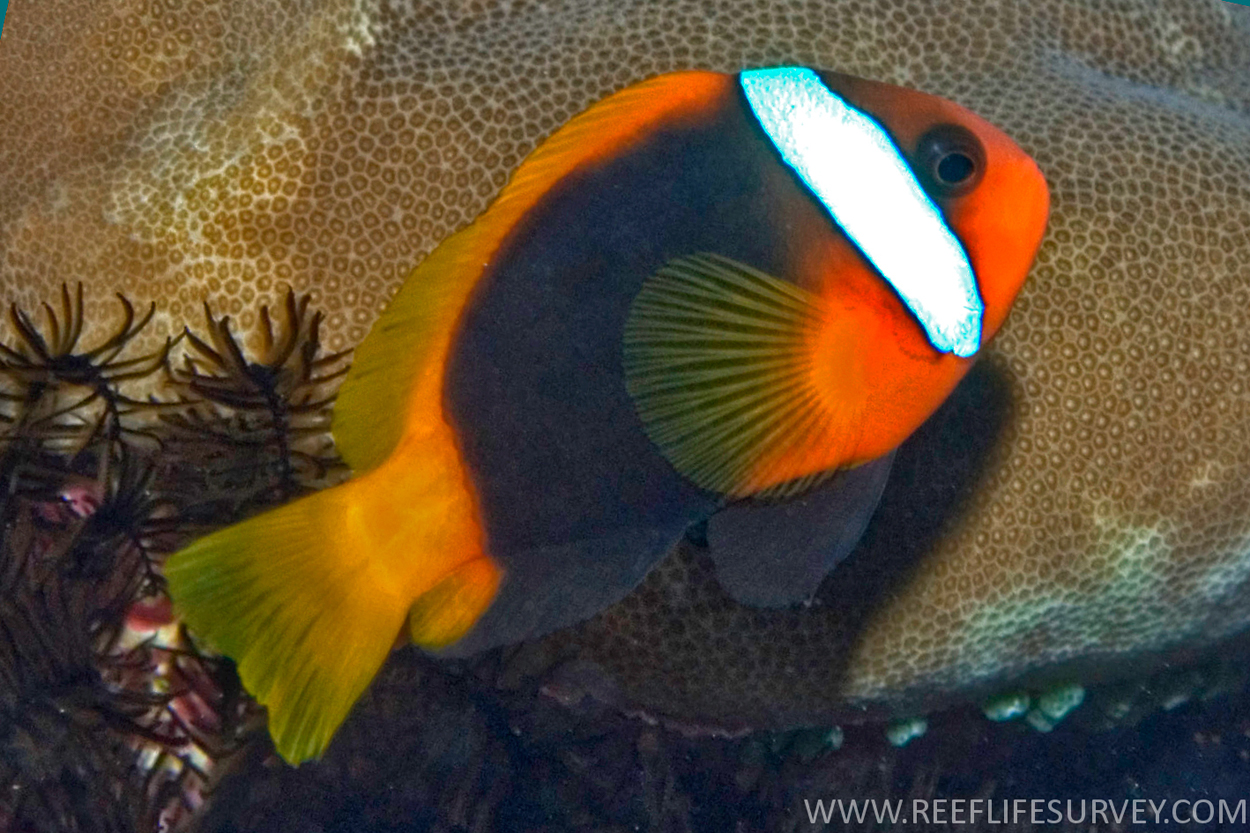
A. melanopus (Red & Black anemonefish)

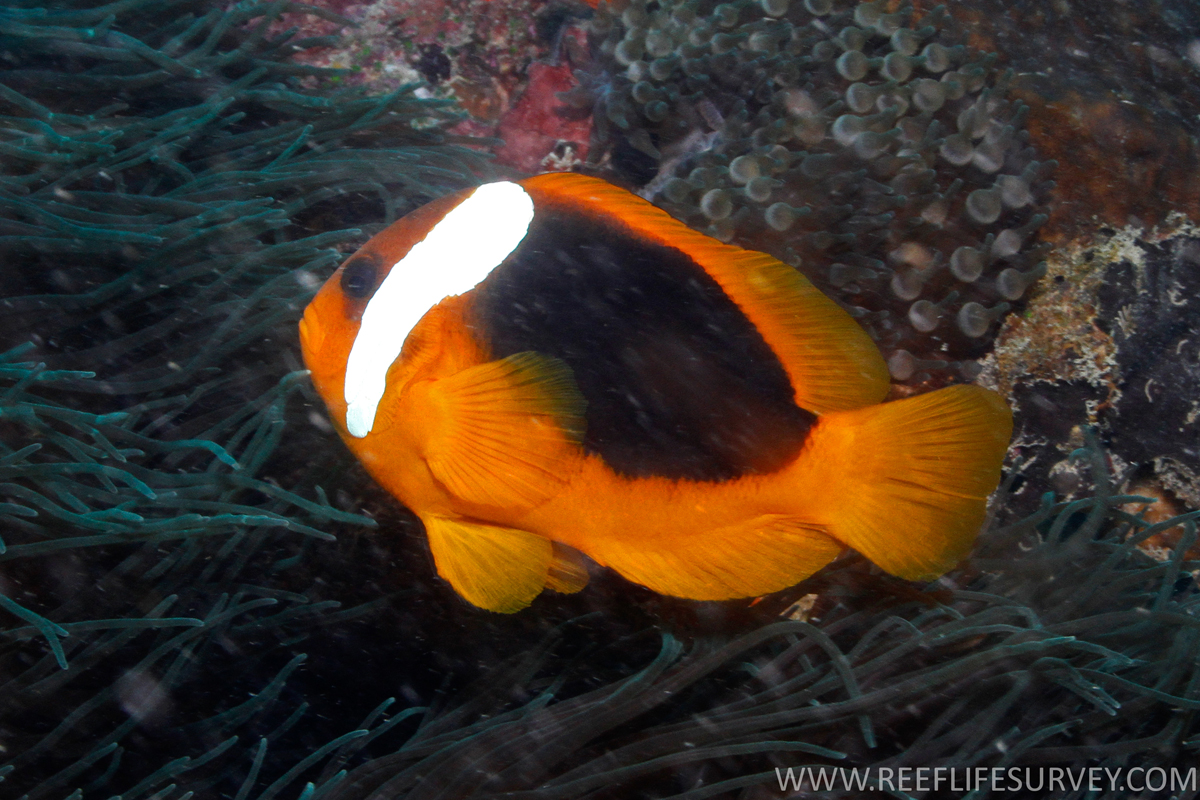
A. rubrocinctus (Australian anemonefish)

== Distribution and habitat ==
A. ephippium is found in the Andaman and Nicobar Islands, Thailand, Malaysia, Sumatra, and Java. The original collection locality, Tranquebar is believed to be erroneous as it is outside the known range.

=== Host anemones ===
A. ephippium is associated with the following species of anemones:

- Entacmaea quadricolor Bubble-tip anemone
- Heteractis crispa Sebae anemone
