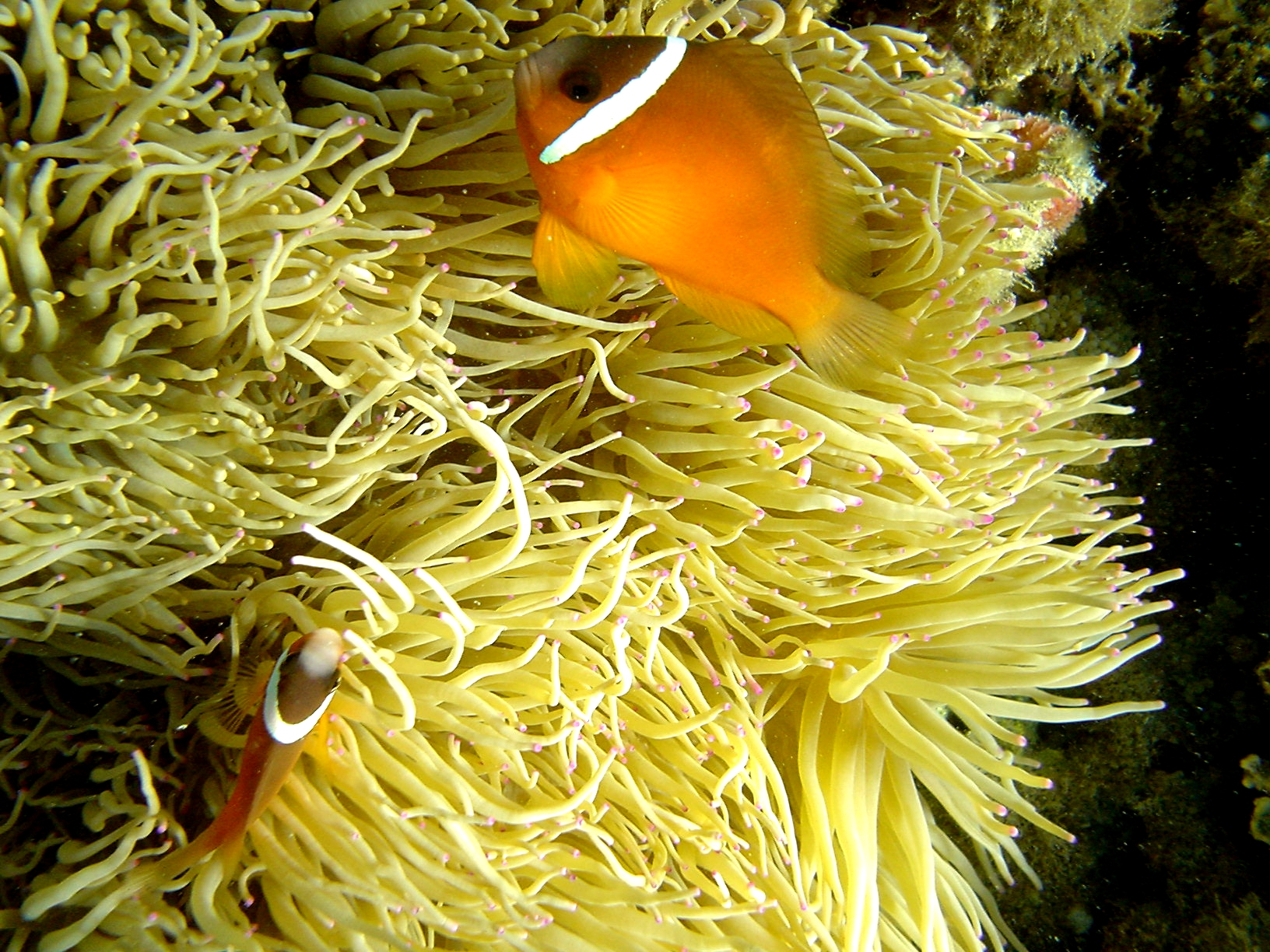

Scientific classification
- Kingdom: Animalia
- Phylum: Chordata
- Class: Actinopterygii
- Order: Blenniiformes
- Family: Pomacentridae
- Genus: Amphiprion
- Species: A. barberi

Binomial name
- Amphiprion barberi Allen, Drew & Kaufman, 2008

= Amphiprion barberi =

Species of fish

Amphiprion barberi is a species of anemonefish that is found in the western Pacific Ocean. It was previously considered a geographic color variation of other anemonefish, initially Amphiprion rubrocinctus from 1972 and then Amphiprion melanopus from 1980 however further study and DNA sequencing resulted in A. barberi being described as a new species in 2008. Like all anemonefishes it forms a symbiotic mutualism with sea anemones and is unaffected by the stinging tentacles of the host anemone. It is a sequential hermaphrodite with a strict sized based dominance hierarchy: the female is largest, the breeding male is second largest, and the male non-breeders get progressively smaller as the hierarchy descends. They exhibit protandry, meaning the breeding male will change to female if the sole breeding female dies, with the largest non-breeder becomes the breeding male. The fish's natural diet includes zooplankton.

== Description ==
The body of adults are generally red-orange with a single white bar. The snout and breast are orange. Each of the caudal, dorsal and anal fins are orange. They have 10 dorsal spines, 2 anal spines, 16-18 dorsal soft rays and 14 anal soft rays. They reach a maximum length of 8.5 cm (3 1/4 in).

=== Color variations ===
Some anemonefish species have color variations based on geographic location, sex and host anemone. A. barberi does not show any of these variations.

=== Similar species ===
Amphiprion rubrocinctus and A. melanopus are geographically distinct. A. rubrocinctus has a distribution restricted to north western Australia while A melanopus is widely distributed in the western Pacific, from the Great Barrier Reef north to the Marshall Islands and Guam, New Guinea and from Vanuatu and New Caledonia to eastern Indonesia. There are significant color-pattern differences, with A. melanopus having a dark brown or blackish body, compared to the red orange of A. barberi. A. melanopus also has 19-26 spines in the upper-opercular series while A. barberi has only 11-19.

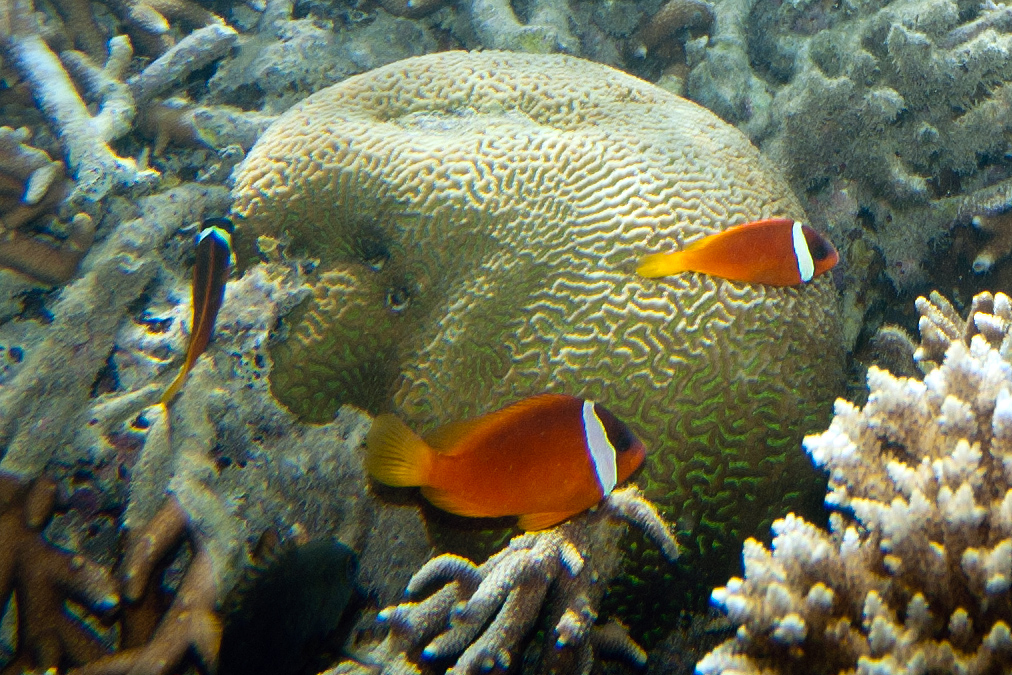
A. barberi (Barber's anemonefish)

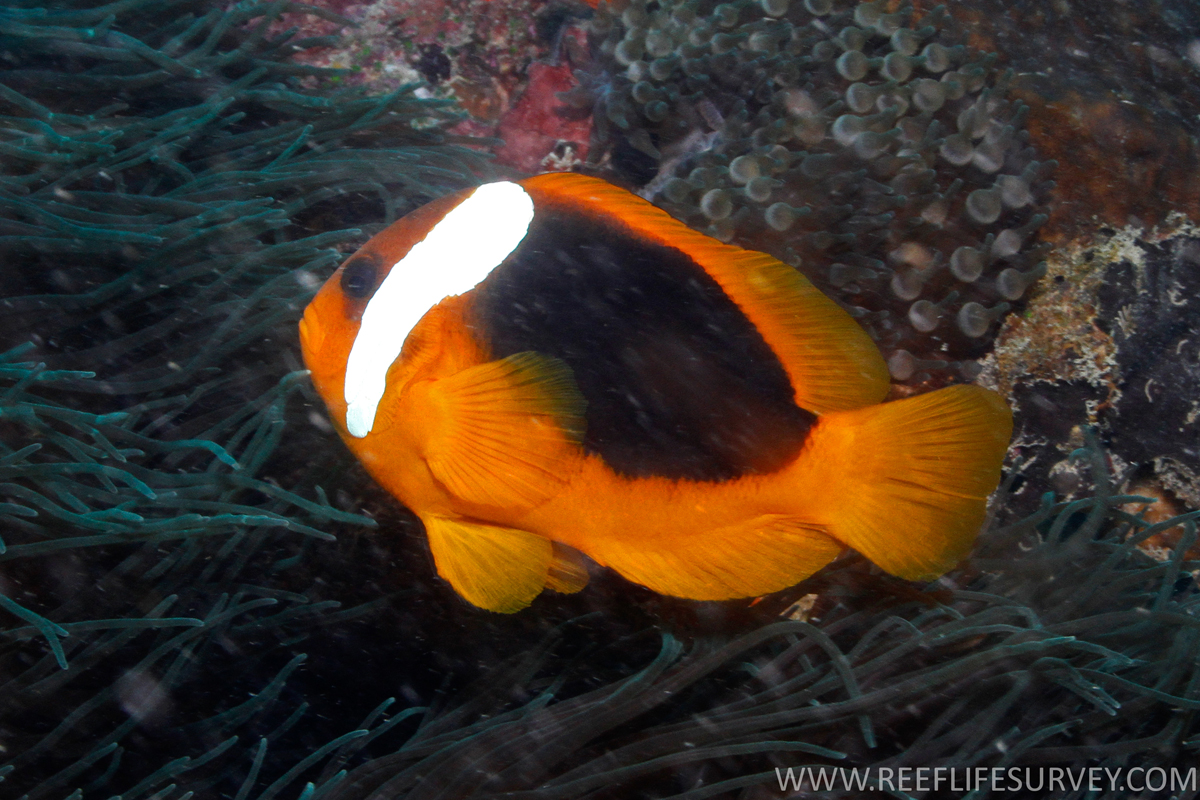
A. rubrocinctus (Australian anemonefish)

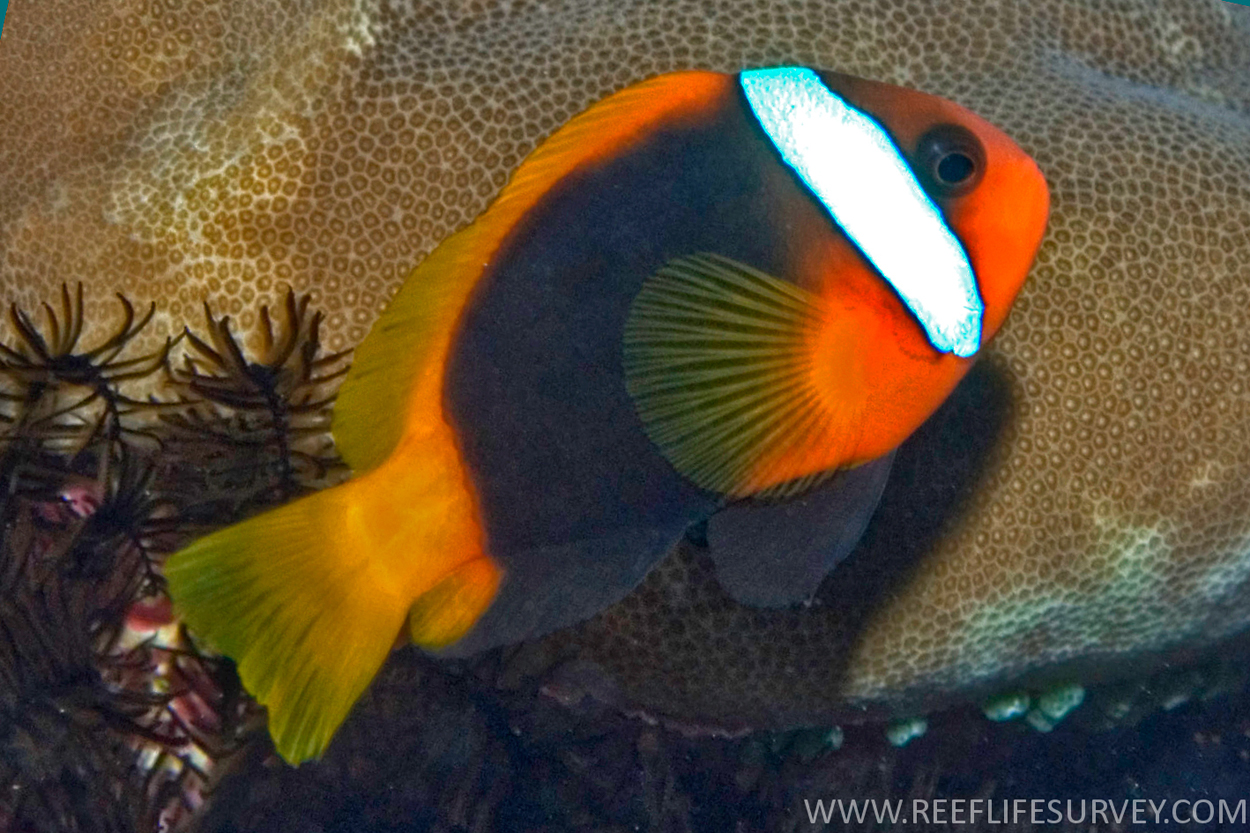
A. melanopus (Red & Black anemonefish)

== Distribution and habitat ==
Amphiprion barberi is reliably only known in the Western Pacific in Fiji, Tonga, and the Samoan Islands, a regional hotspot of endemism.

=== Host anemones ===
The relationship between anemonefish and their host sea anemones is not random and instead is highly nested in structure. A. barberi is specialised, being hosted by only 2 out of the 6 host anemones found in the region. A. barberi is hosted by the following species of anemone:

- Entacmaea quadricolor Bubble-tip anemone
- Heteractis crispa Sebae anemone

== Conservation status ==
Anemonefish and their host anemones are found on coral reefs and face similar environmental issues. Like corals, anemone's contain intracellular endosymbionts, zooxanthellae, and can suffer from bleaching due to triggers such as increased water temperature or acidification. Characteristics known to elevate the risk of extinction are small geographic range, small local population and extreme habitat specialisation. While A. barberi has a small geographic range, it is said to be common in Fiji and frequently encountered in Samoa and its ability to use two different anemone hosts may reduce the risk of extinction associated with extreme specialisation. This species was not evaluated in the 2012 release of the IUCN Red List.

== Etymology ==
The specific name honours Paul Barber of Boston University in recognition of his contributions to the study of genetic relationships of the organisms of Indo-Pacific coral reefs.
