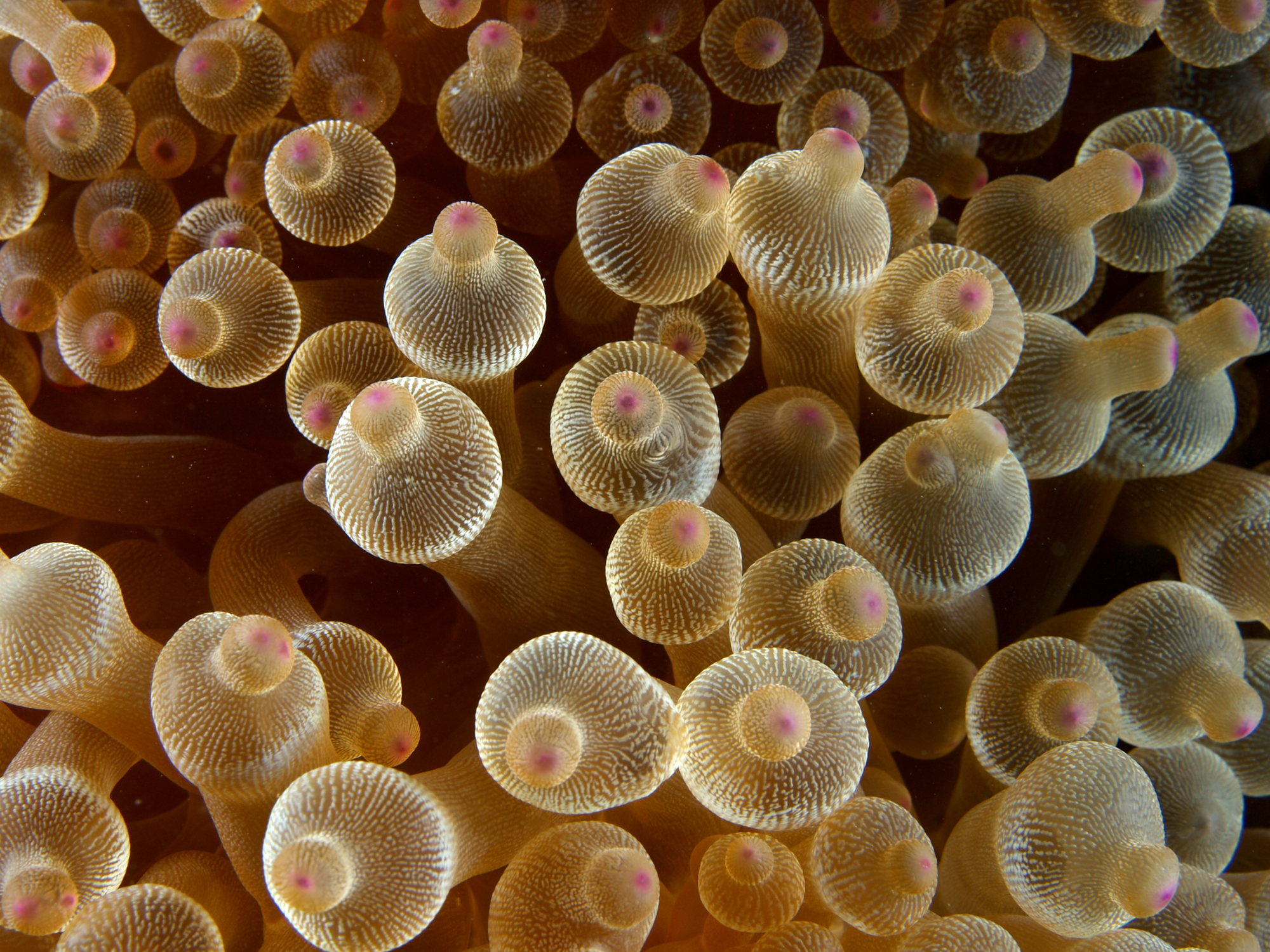
- A colony of Entacmaea quadricolor.

Scientific classification
- Kingdom: Animalia
- Phylum: Cnidaria
- Subphylum: Anthozoa
- Class: Hexacorallia
- Order: Actiniaria
- Family: Actiniidae
- Genus: Entacmaea; Ehrenberg, 1834

Species
- See text

Synonyms
- Entacmea; Physobrachia Saville-Kent, 1893; Psychobrachia Saville-Kent, 1893

= Entacmaea =

Genus of sea anemones

Entacmaea is a genus of sea anemone in the family Actiniidae.

== Species ==
The following species are recognized in the genus Entacmaea:

- Entacmaea medusivora Fautin & Fitt, 1991
- Entacmaea quadricolor (Leuckart in Rüppell & Leuckart, 1828)
