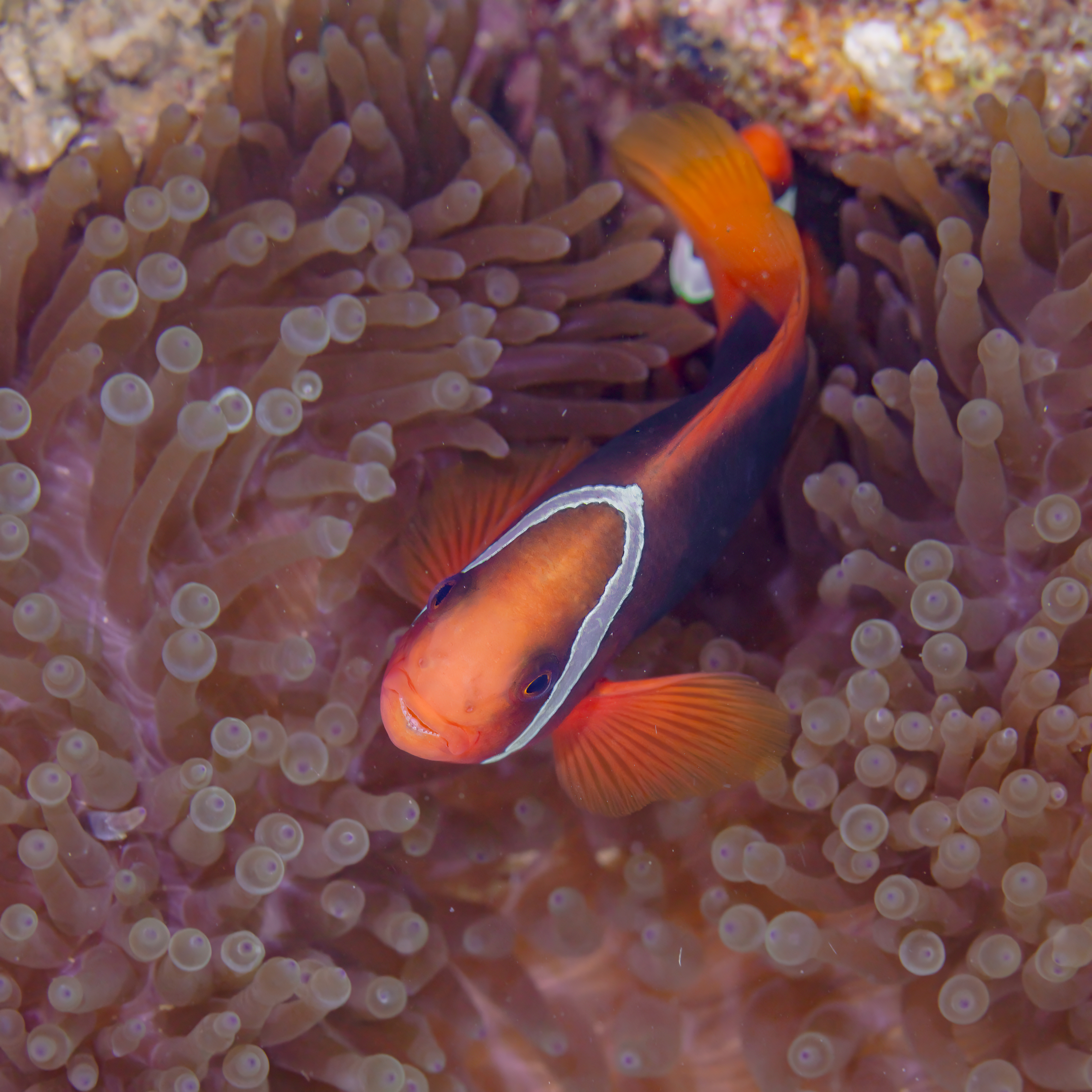

Conservation status
- Least Concern (IUCN 3.1)

Scientific classification
- Kingdom: Animalia
- Phylum: Chordata
- Class: Actinopterygii
- Division: Teleostei
- Order: Blenniiformes
- Family: Pomacentridae
- Genus: Amphiprion
- Species: A. frenatus

Binomial name
- Amphiprion frenatus Brevoort, 1856

Synonyms
- Prochilus polylepis Bleeker, 1877; Amphiprion polylepis (Bleeker, 1877)

= Tomato clownfish =

Species of fish

The tomato clownfish (Amphiprion frenatus) is a species of marine fish in the family Pomacentridae, the clownfishes and damselfishes. It is native to the waters of the Western Pacific, from the Japan to Indonesia. Other common names include blackback anemonefish, bridled anemonefish, fire clown, and red tomato clown.

== Characteristics of anemonefish ==
Clownfish or anemonefish are fishes that, in the wild, form symbiotic mutualisms with sea anemones and are unaffected by the stinging tentacles of the host anemone, see Amphiprioninae § Mutualism. The sea anemone protects the clownfish from predators, as well as providing food through the scraps left from the anemone's meals and occasional dead anemone tentacles. In return, the clownfish defends the anemone from its predators, and parasites. Clownfish are small, 10–18 centimetres (3.9–7.1 in), and depending on species, they are overall yellow, orange, or reddish or blackish color, and many show white bars or patches. Within species there may be color variations, most commonly according to distribution, but also based on sex, age and host anemone. Clownfish are found in warmer waters of the Indian and Pacific oceans and the Red Sea in sheltered reefs or in shallow lagoons.

In a group of clownfish, there is a strict dominance hierarchy. The largest and most aggressive fish is female and is found at the top. Only two clownfish, a male and a female, in a group reproduce through external fertilization. Clownfish are sequential hermaphrodites, meaning that they develop into males first, and when they mature, they become females.

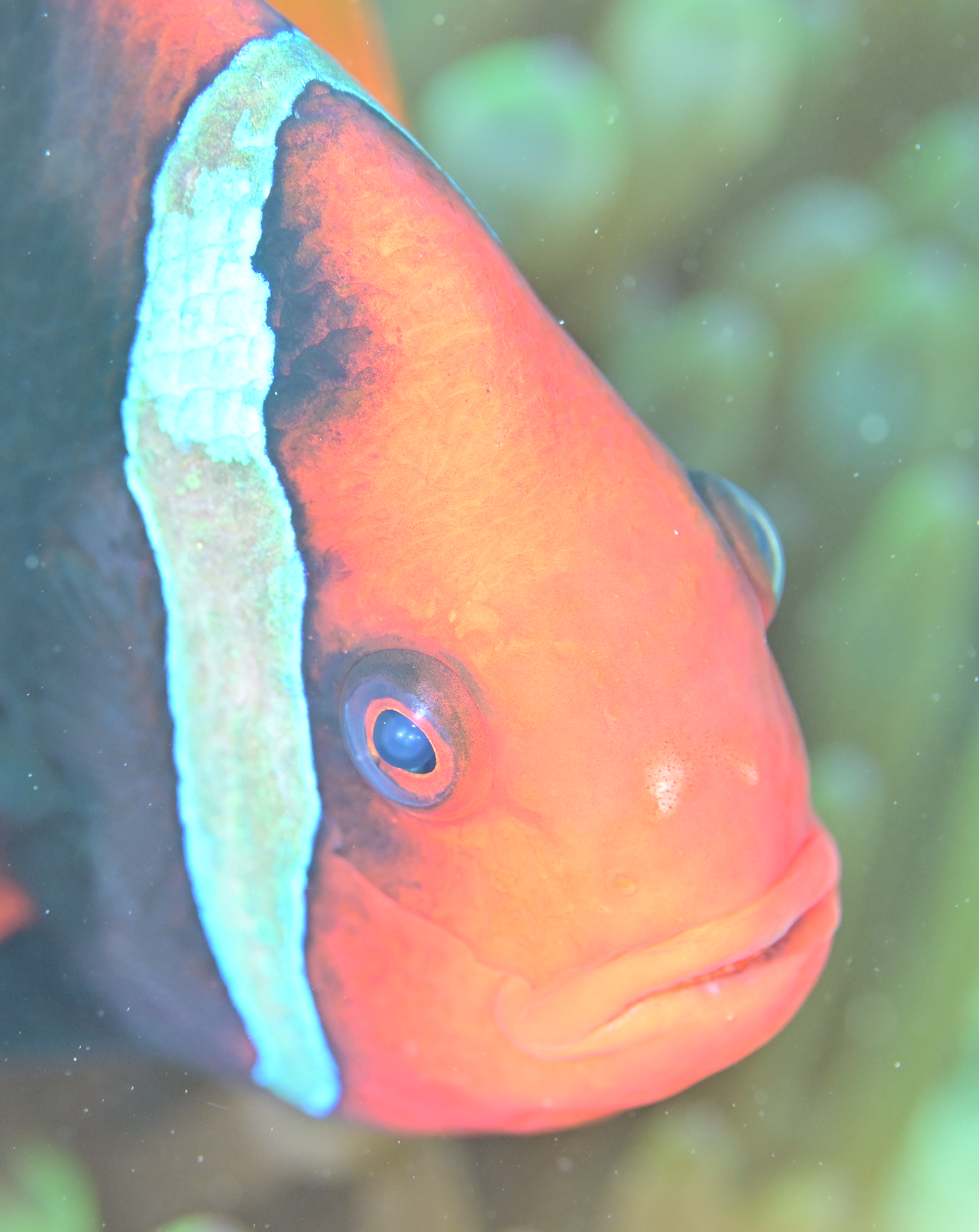
Tomato Anemonefish (Amphiprion frenatus) - El Nido 2025

== Description ==
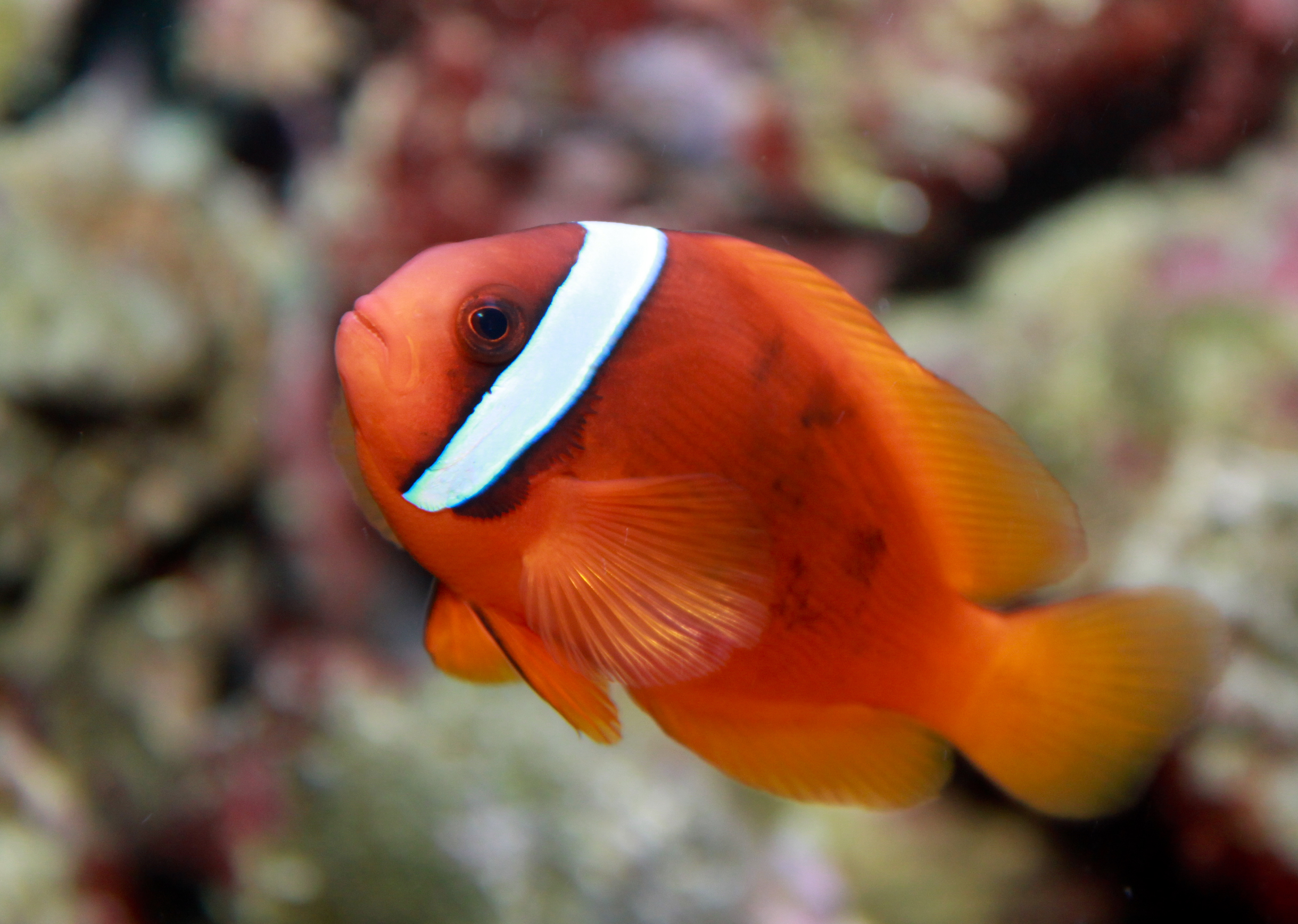
A male lacking black sides

The adult fish is bright orange-red, with a white head bar or vertical stripe just behind the eyes, joined over the head and with a distinctive black outline. Females are mainly blackish on the sides. Males are considerably smaller and are red overall. Juveniles are a darker red, with two or three white bars. They have 9-10 dorsal spines, 2 anal spines, 16–18 dorsal soft rays and 13–15 anal soft rays. They reach a maximum length of 14 cm (5 1/2 in).

One of the most serious ectoparsitic diseases that effects warmwater marine fishes is the Marine Velvet disease (amyloodiniosis) which is caused by Amyloodinium ocellatum, a species of Dinoflagellate. The Tomato clownfish has a strong and long-lived immunity to this parasite. It gains this immunity by having several nonleathal infections and the production of specific antibodies. This immunoglobulin antibody is reduced and consist of heavy chain of 70 kD and a light chains of 32 kD. The estimated weight of the entire antibody is 816 kD.

=== Color variations ===
The only color variation is sex related with females having darker coloration or dark spots on their sides.

=== Similar species ===
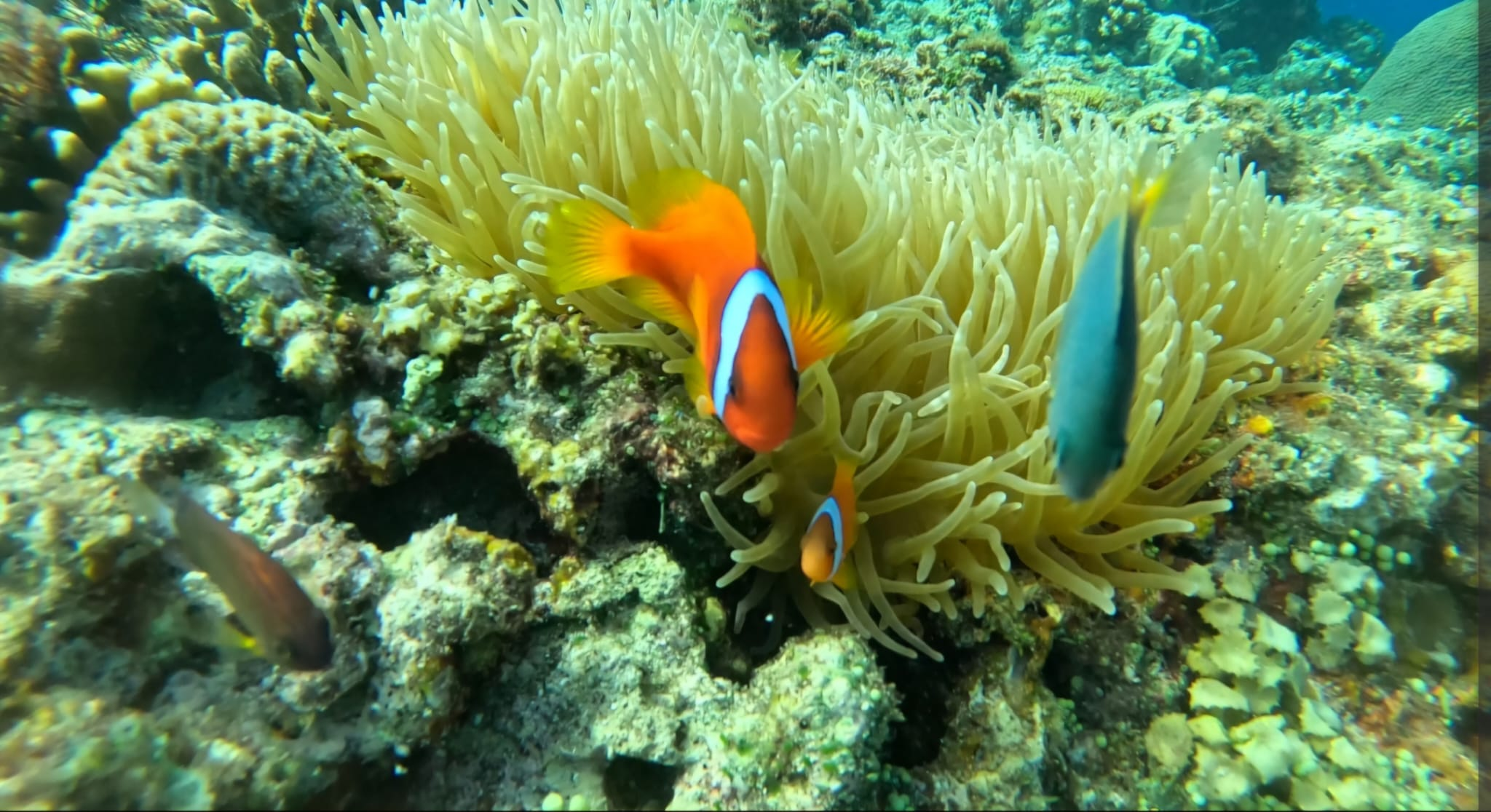
Tomato clownfish and Thalassoma

The Australian clownfish (A. rubrocinctus) has a similar coloration, however the female does not have the distinctive black outline of the white band, the band is poorly developed and may be discontinuous on top of the head. Geographic location is the easiest way to distinguish small juveniles as they are otherwise difficult to distinguish. The cinnamon clownfish (A. melanopus) is also similar, but has a broader white headbar and outside Melanesia it has black pelvic and anal fins.

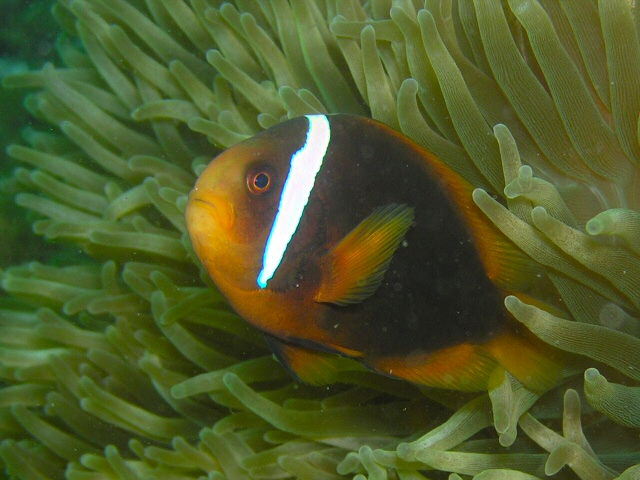
A. frenatus (Tomato anemonefish)

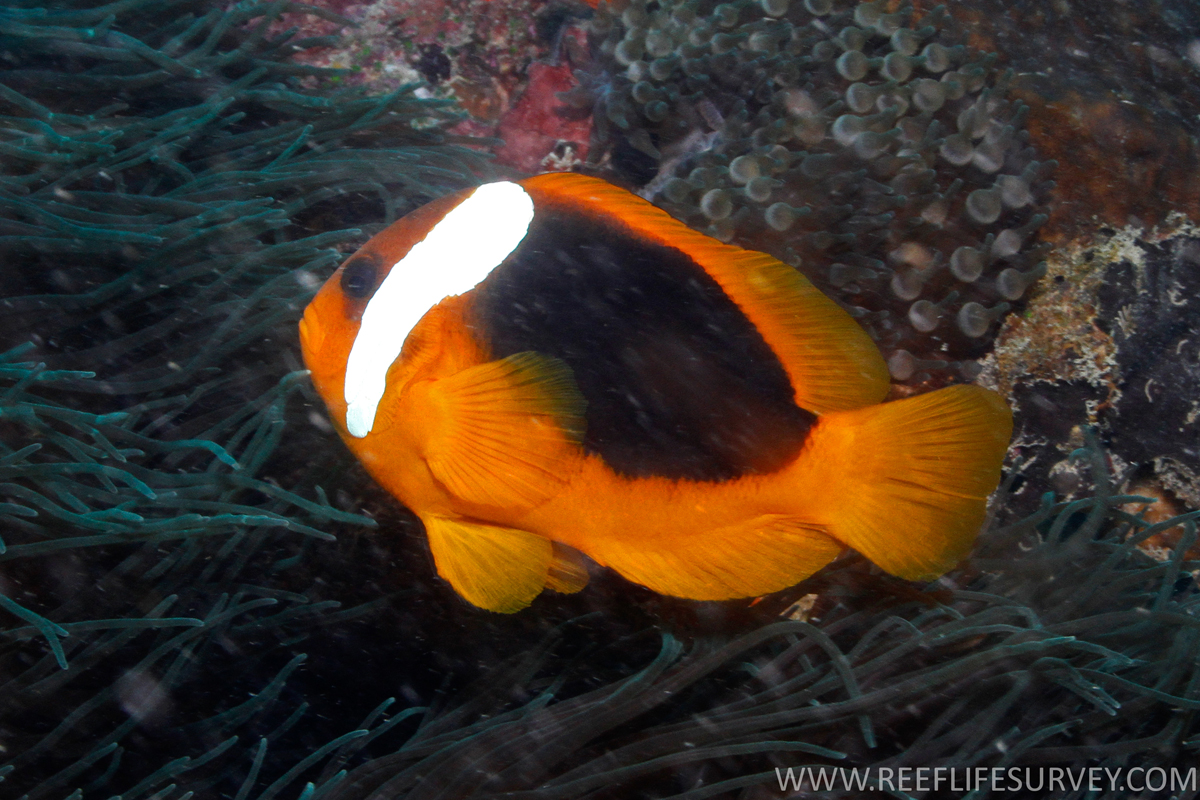
A. rubrocinctus (Australian anemonefish)

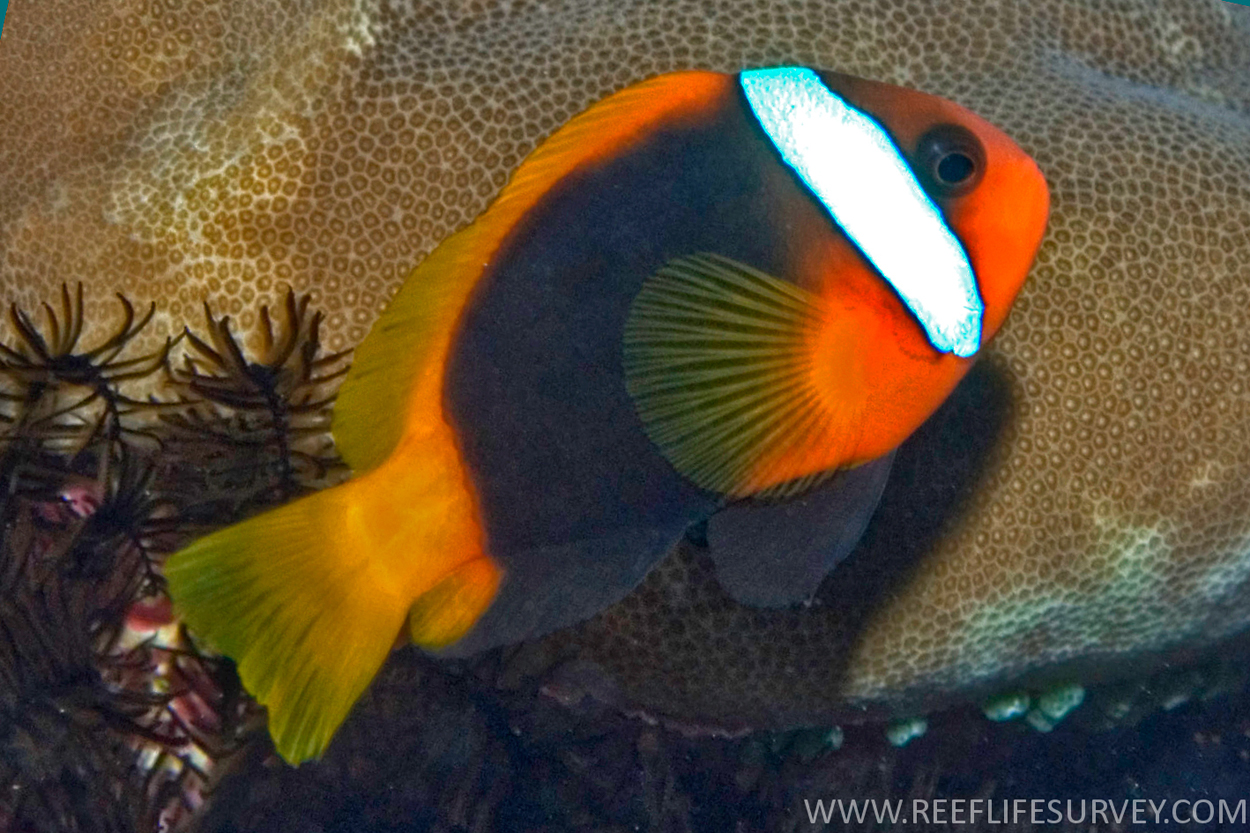
A. melanopus (Red & Black anemonefish)

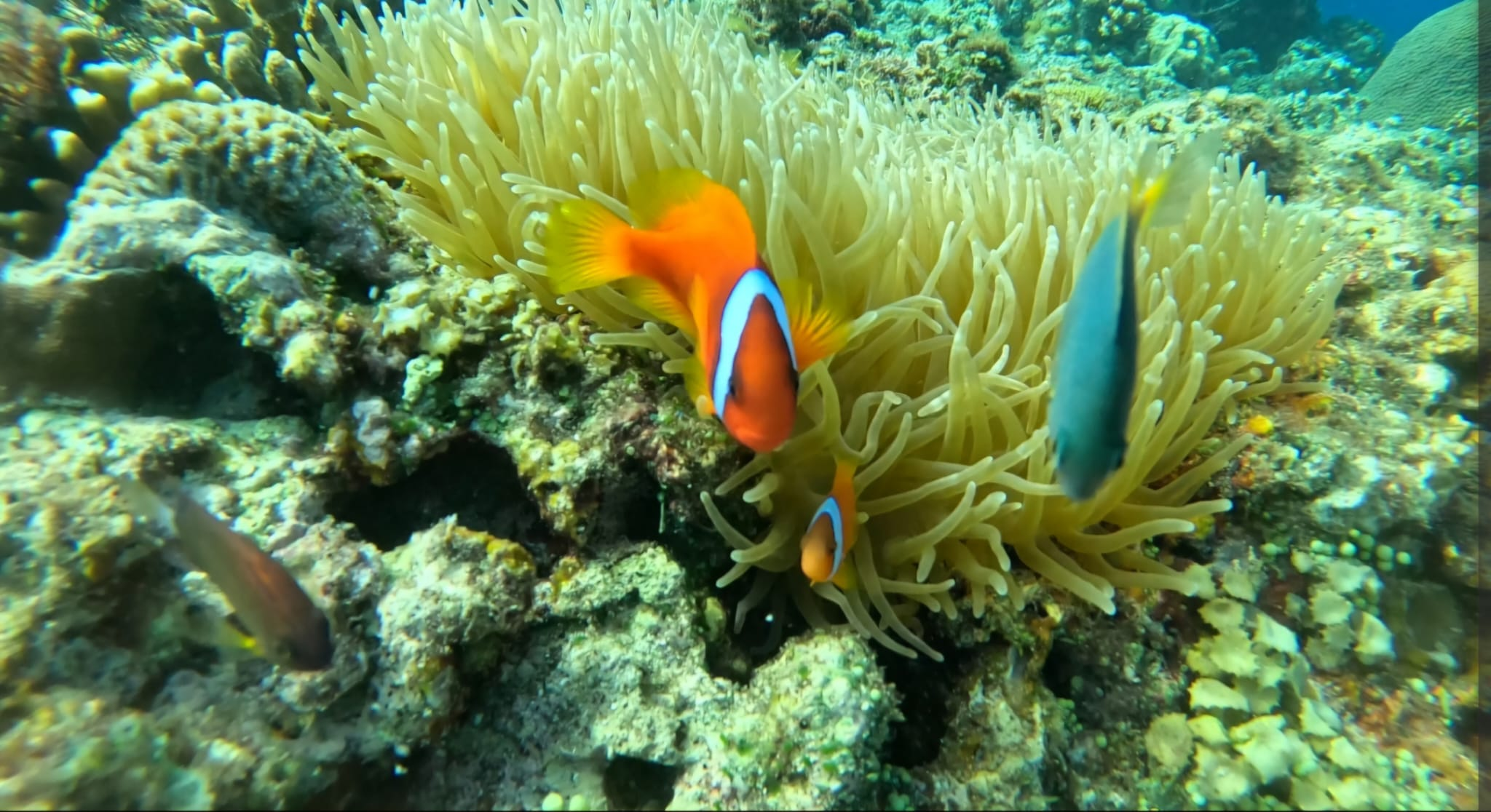
Tomato clownfish and Thalassoma

== Distribution and habitat ==
This species is found as far north as Ryukyu Islands, Japan, to the South China Sea and surrounding areas including Malaysia and Indonesia. Some authors report that this species is associated with a single species of anemone, the bubble-tip anemone (Entacmaea quadricolor). Other authorities report that it may be associated with the sebae anemone (Heteractis crispa), as well.

== In aquaria ==
A tomato clownfish in a tank with a sea anemone

As a pet, many marine hobbyists agree that at least 20 US gallons (76 L) of tank volume is necessary for the fish, however others believe larger is necessary for this fish to have ample room for maneuvering. Many hobbyists use a quarantine tank prior to introduction into the main tank as it helps to rid the tomato clownfish of saltwater-borne diseases.

This species of fish thrives well even without a host anemone. In the absence of a host, it may "adopt" corals of a tank to reside. It will eat most meat or vegetable food preparations, including dried algae, mysis shrimp, and brine shrimp. The tomato clownfish has been reported to be aggressive and territorial when mature, and specimens have been known to be extremely aggressive even towards clownfishes of other species. For this reason, it is best kept singly or in mated pairs. It can be bred in captivity, and the fry can be fed on baby brine shrimp and rotifers.
