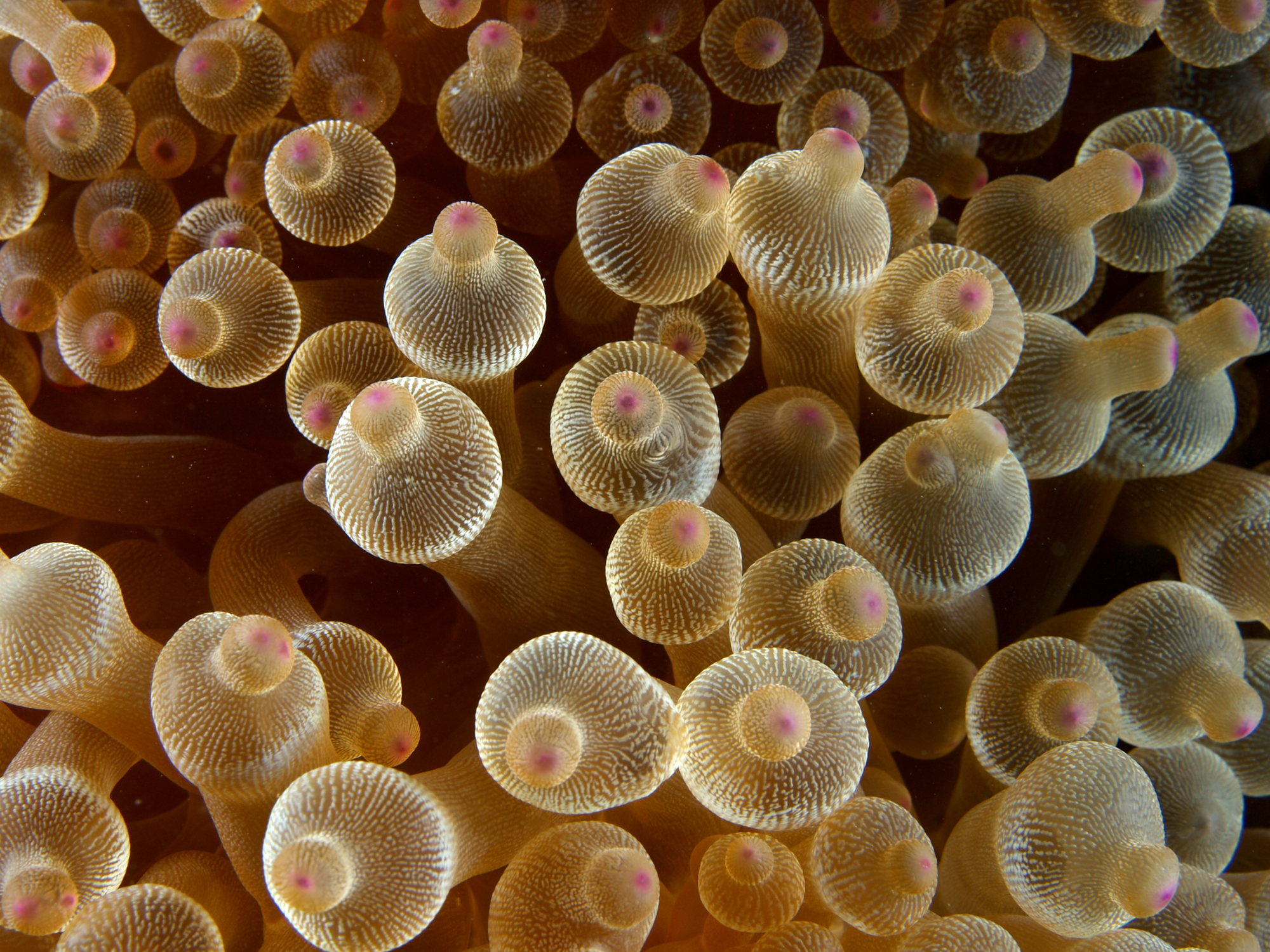
- A colony of Entacmaea quadricolor. Young individuals may have about 20 tentacles, with numbers increasing during their lifetime.

Scientific classification
- Kingdom: Animalia
- Phylum: Cnidaria
- Subphylum: Anthozoa
- Class: Hexacorallia
- Order: Actiniaria
- Family: Actiniidae
- Genus: Entacmaea
- Species: E. quadricolor

Binomial name
- Entacmaea quadricolor (Leuckart in Rüppell & Leuckart, 1828)

Synonyms
- List: Actinia adhaerens Hemprich & Ehrenberg in Ehrenberg, 1834; Actinia ehrenbergii Brandt, 1835; Actinia erythrosoma Hemprich & Ehrenberg in Ehrenberg, 1834; Actinia helianthus Hemprich & Ehrenberg in Ehrenberg, 1834; Actinia quadricolor Leuckart in Rüppell & Leuckart, 1828; Actinia quatricolor; Actinia vas; Actinia vasa Quoy & Gaimard: de Blainville, 1830; Actinia vasum; Anemonia adhaerens Ehrenberg; Anemonia adherens; Anemonia erythrosoma Ehrenberg; Anemonia kwoiam Haddon & Shackleton, 1893; Anemonia ramsayi (Haddon & Shackleton, 1893); Antheopsis carlgreni Lager, 1911; Aulactinia gelam (Haddon & Shackleton); Cereactis quadricolor Leuckart; Condylactis erythrosoma (Hemprich & Ehrenberg in Ehrenberg, 1834); Condylactis ramsayi Haddon & Shackleton, 1893; Corynactis quadricolor Leuckart; Corynactis vas Quoy & Gaimard; Crambactis arabica Haeckel, 1876; Crambractis arabica; Cymbactis maxima Wassilieff, 1908; Entacmaea actinostoloides; Entacmaea adhaerens Hemprich & Ehrenberg; Entacmaea quadricolour; Entacmaea ramsayi (Haddon & Shackleton, 1893); Entacmea quadricolor (Leuckart in Rüppel & Leuckart, 1828); Gyrostoma helianthus (Hemprich & Ehrenberg in Ehrenberg, 1834); Gyrostoma quadricolor; Gyrostoma adhaerens (Hemprich & Ehrenberg); Gyrostoma adherens (Ehrenberg, 1834); Gyrostoma erythrosoma (Hemprich & Ehrenberg, 1851); Gyrostoma erythrososma (Hemprich & Ehrenberg); Gyrostoma haddoni Lager, 1911; Gyrostoma helianthus (Hemprich & Ehrenberg in Ehrenberg, 1834); Gyrostoma heliantus; Gyrostoma hertwigi Kwietniewski, 1897; Gyrostoma kwoiam (Haddon & Shackleton, 1893); Gyrostoma quadricolor; Gyrostoma ramsayi (Haddon & Shackleton); Gyrostoma stuhlmanni Carlgren, 1900; Gyrostoma sulcatum Lager, 1911; Gysostoma hertwigi; Heteractis gelam (Haddon & Shackleton, 1893); Isacmaea erythrosoma (Hemprich & Ehrenberg in Ehrenberg, 1834); Isactinia kwoiam (Hadd. & Shackl.); Melactis vas; Metactis vas; Paracicyonis maxima; Paractis adhaerens; Paractis ehrenbergii Br.; Paractis erythrosoma; Paractis helianthus; Physobrachia douglasi Saville-Kent, 1893; Physobrachia ramsayi Mariscal, 1970; Physobrachia ramsayi (Haddon & Shackleton, 1893); Psychobrachia douglasi; Radianthus carlgreni (Lager, 1911); Radianthus gelam (Haddon & Shackleton, 1893); Ropalactis vas Quoy & Gaimard

= Bubble-tip anemone =

Species of sea anemone

Bubble-tip anemone (Entacmaea quadricolor) is a species of sea anemone in the family Actiniidae. Like several anemone species, E. quadricolor can support several anemonefish species, and displays two growth types based on where they live in the water column, one of which gives it the common name, due to the bulbous tips on its tentacles.

== Distribution ==
Entacmaea quadricolor is widespread throughout the tropical waters of the Indo-Pacific area, including the Red Sea.

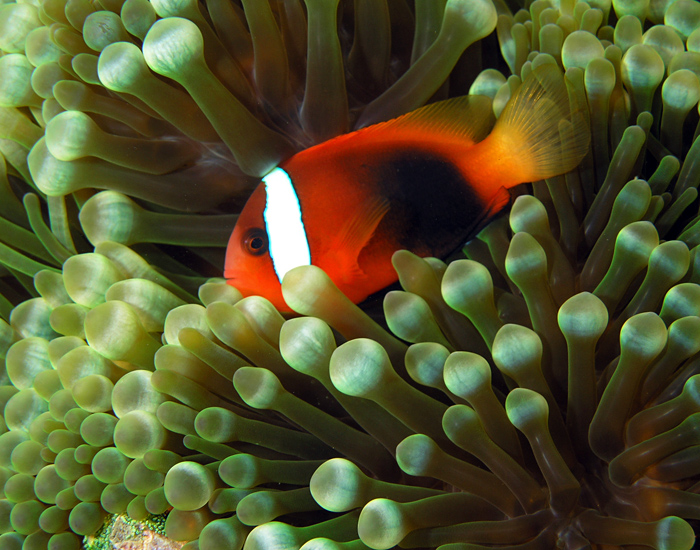
Amphiprion melanopus anemonefish in a bubble anemone from East Timor

E. quadricolor anemones appear in a variety of morphs, including rose, orange, red, and standard green. This sea anemone can grow to be up to 30 centimetres (0.98 ft) in diameter, and obtains the majority of its energy from solar radiation via its symbiotic zooxanthellae.

A characteristic of E. quadricolor is its ability to maintain a symbiotic relationship with the anemonefish, which can be "hosted" by the anemone by providing it with defence against predators and also providing some nourishment. In turn, the anemone provides the anemonefish with shelter.

Nutrients are generally obtained by filter feeding using its sweeping tentacles, or through wastes and debris cleaned from the surface of its partner anemonefish.

In the wild, E. quadricolor are found in two locations. Large adult specimens, with tentacles that are more streaming or stringy, are often found in deeper waters with more dimly lit conditions. These specimens are often solitary, while smaller, younger specimens are often located in groups or colonies nearer to the surface, in bright sunlight. These specimens tend to show the bulbous tips on their tentacles that are characteristic of E. quadricolor. The tips of the anemones will have their characteristic bulbs based on several parameters. These include: flow, light, bacterial count, color, and if its hosting. When they are placed in home aquariums, medium flow and medium lighting will be sufficient if your tank is old enough to captivate anemones.

== Symbionts ==
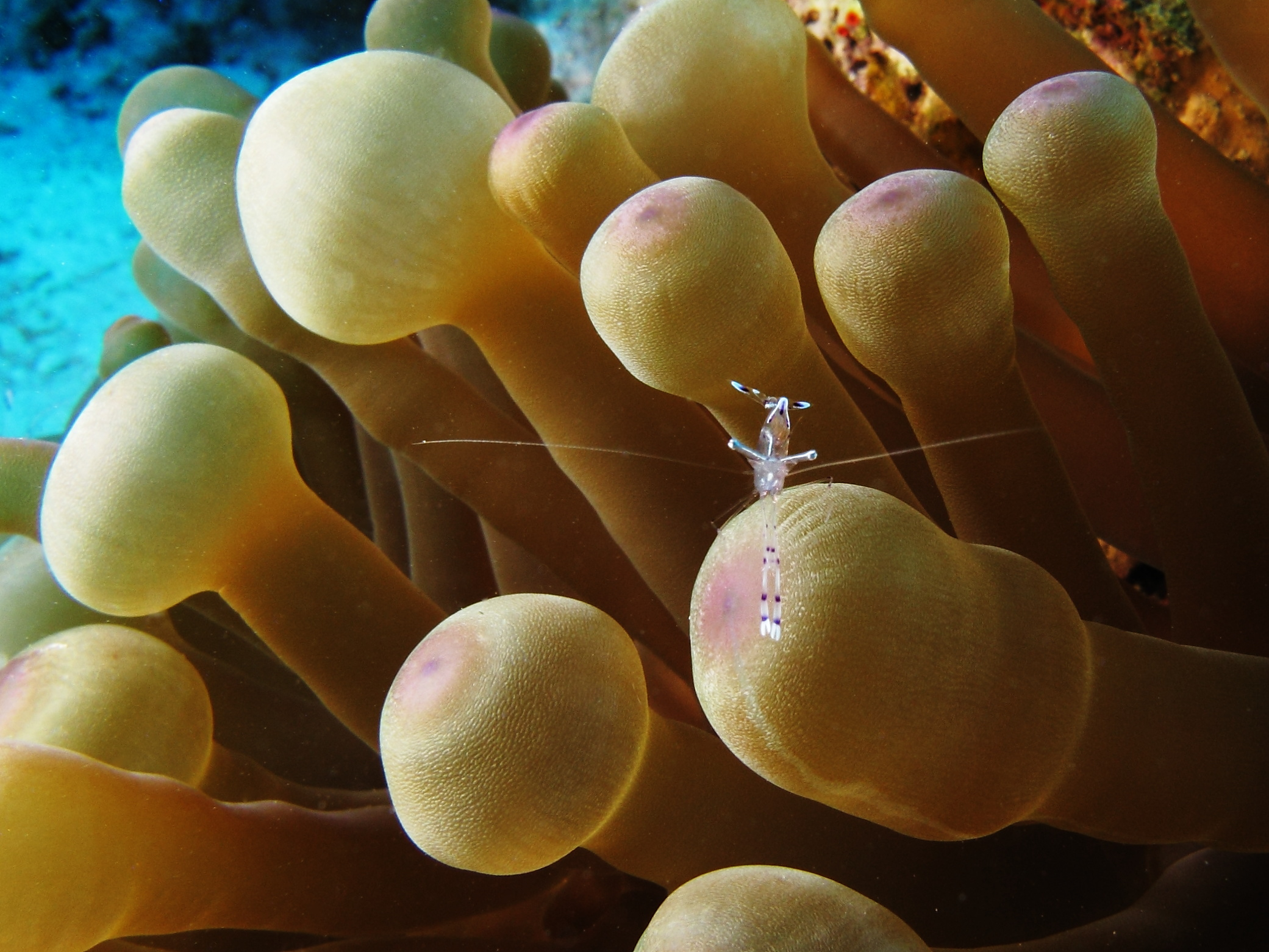
Shrimp on Red Sea bubble-tip anemone

E. quadricolor is found within the range of most anemonefish and is highly generalist, hosting 14 different species, around half the species of anemonefish. It is thought the primary reason it does not host other species is competition, with other factors being habitat preferences or host-fish biochemical signalling. The anemone fish hosted by E. quadricolor are:

- Amphiprion akindynos (Barrier reef anemonefish)
- A. allardi (Allard's anemonefish)
- A. barberi (Barber's anemonefish)
- A. bicinctus (Two-band anemonefish)
- A. chrysopterus (Orange-fin anemonefish)
- A. clarkii (Clark's anemonefish)
- A. ephippium (Red Saddleback anemonefish)
- A. frenatus (Tomato anemonefish)
- A. mccullochi (Whitesnout anemonefish)
- A. melanopus (Red and black anemonefish) (primarily clustered form)
- A. omanensis (Oman anemonefish)
- A. rubrocinctus (Australian anemonefish)
- A. tricinctus (Three-band anemonefish)
- Premnas biaculeatus (Maroon anemonefish) (only solitary form)

E. quadricolor also associates with juvenile Dascyllus trimaculatus and shrimps such as Periclimenes brevicarpalis.

== Reproduction ==
=== Sexual reproduction ===
E. quadricolor exhibits a variety of reproductive strategies. The most common strategy would be a form of sexual reproduction called broadcast spawning. This is considered the main form of reproduction and occurs at the start of the year between January and April for those in eastern Australian waters. During these times, E. quadricolor will release its gametes into the water column and form free-swimming planula larvae. These larvae of E. quadricolor have been observed to survive up to 59 days in the water column, with peak settlement occurring around 10 days. This time of suspension allows for greater dispersal and increases genetic diversity for the species. Once the larvae settle, they will then begin to further develop and start the cycle once more.

=== Asexual reproduction ===
E. quadricolor can also reproduce asexually. For most anemone species, asexual reproduction may occur by pedal laceration, longitudinal fission, or transverse fission. E. quadricolor will occasional reproduce asexually using longitudinal fission, but this is on rare occasions. This form of reproduction allows for quick reproduction of successful genotypes but will also lead to genetic isolation and reduced dispersal as individuals are likely to attach to the first hard surface they encounter.

== Aquaculture ==
In aquariums, E. quadricolor will reproduce asexually or sexually when in proper care with supplemented minerals such as iodine and other trace elements, usually purchased as an enrichment cocktail by most home aquarists. E. quadricolor is commonly kept in marine aquariums and comes in variety of colors, green and rose being the most common. Without adequate lighting, the anemone will expel its photosynthetic symbiotic zooxanthellae, a process commonly known as "bleaching" which will progressively result in its death. White or excessively translucent specimens are likely in various phases of bleaching and should not be purchased.

Anemones are not easy to keep, and require a knowledgeable aquarist. The aquarium must be at least six months old and stable to receive the anemone. The bigger the tank, the easier it will be to keep a healthy anemone.

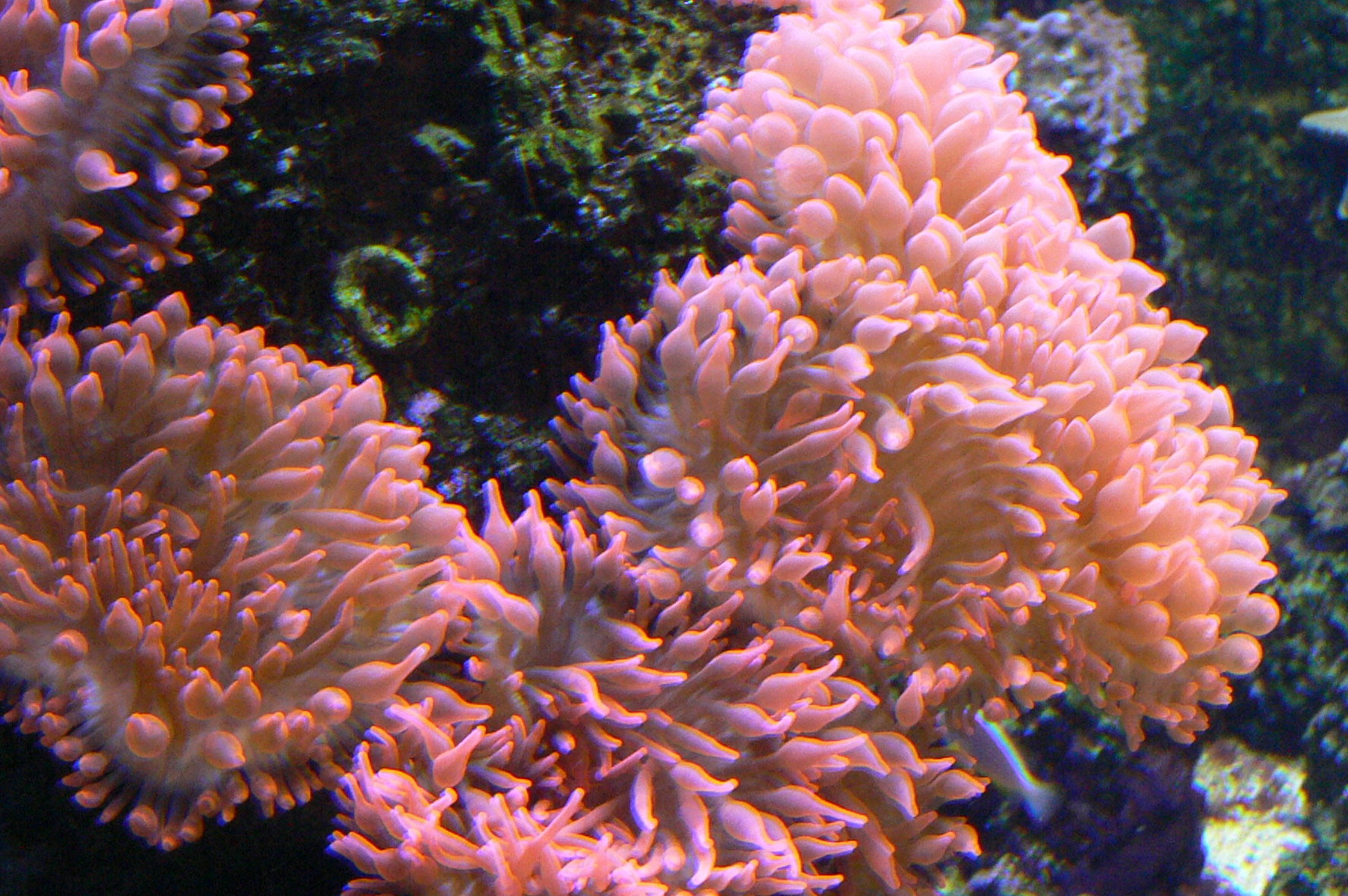
A group of individuals

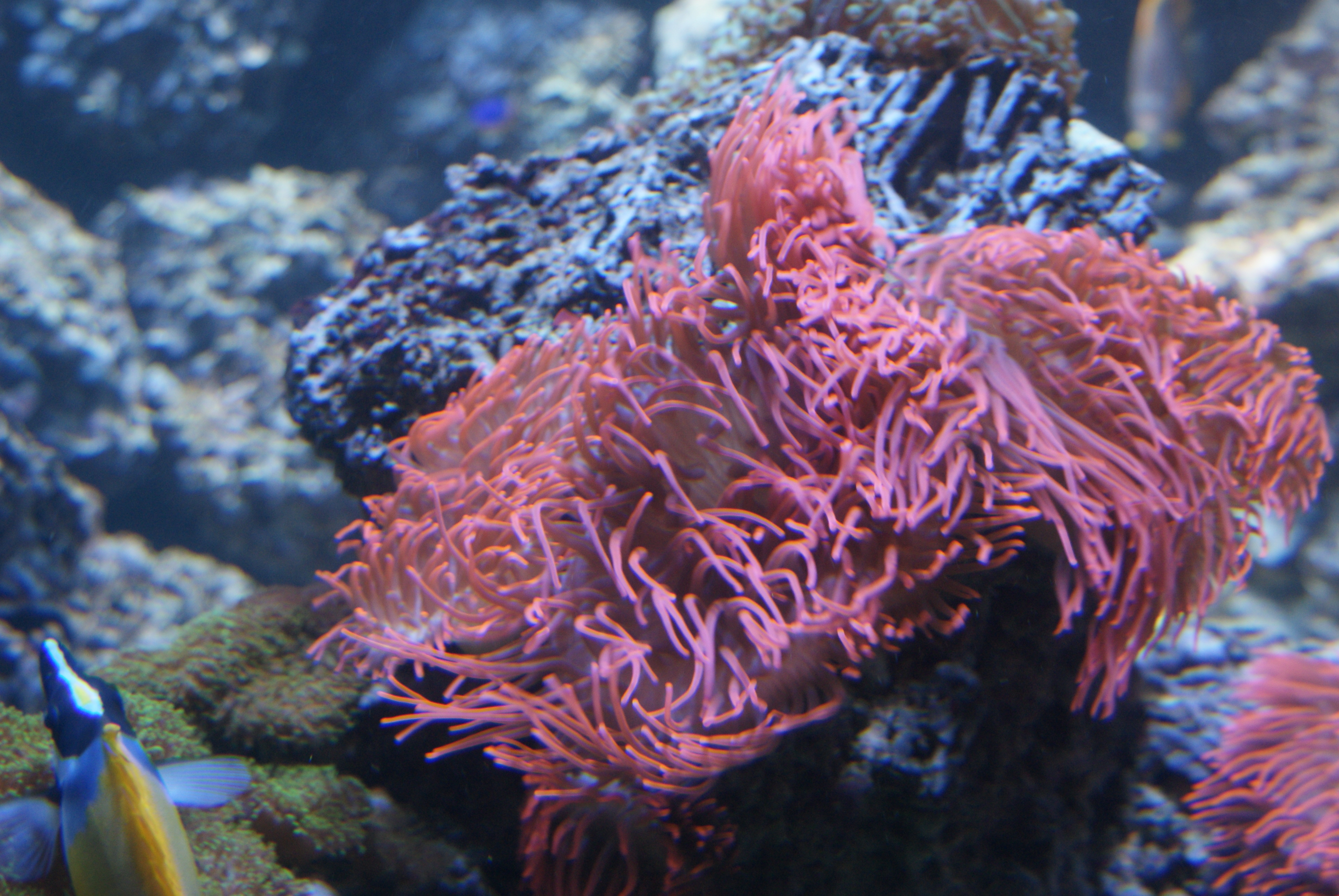
Rose

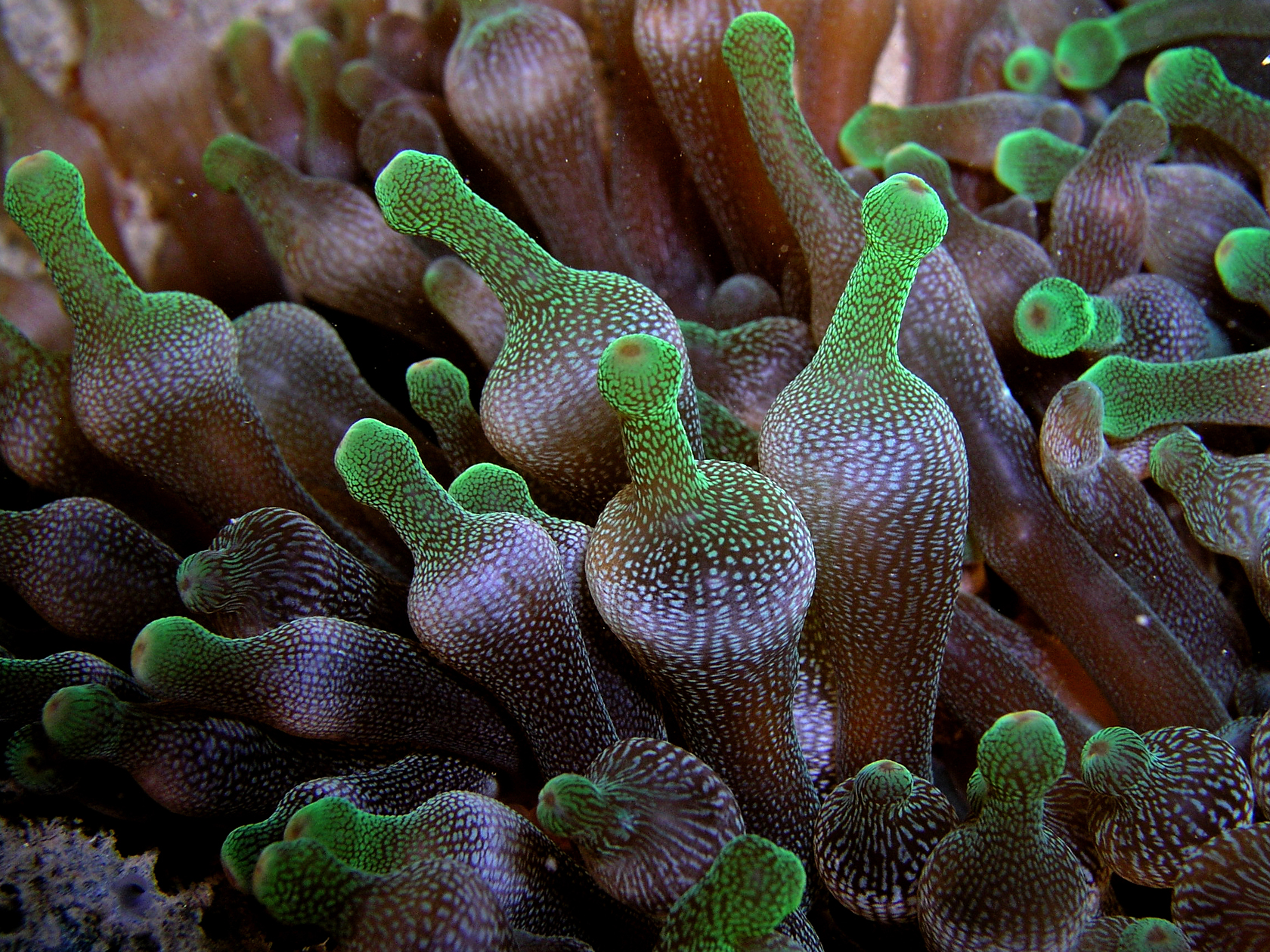
Green tipped

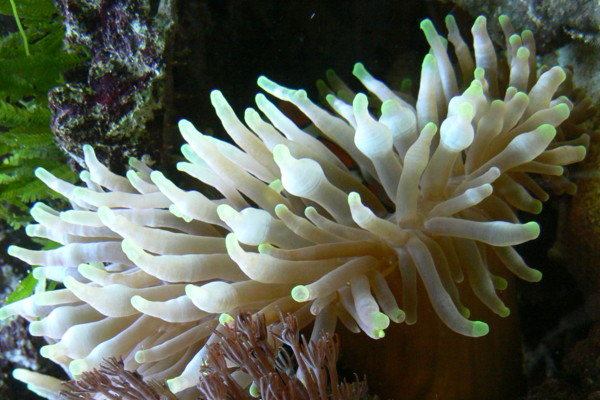
Bleached (unhealthy)

== Conservation and threats ==
E quadricolor is not currently listed on the IUCN Red List of Threatened Species, but it is facing hardships with global climate change and anthropogenic activities. Anthropogenic activities have increased atmospheric carbon dioxide and consequently global temperatures are predicted to raise by 4.3 °C while seawater pH is likely to decrease by 0.3 units. It has been observed that future ocean temperatures will cause bleaching in E. quadricolor, whereas increased pCO_{2} generally had no significant effects on the anemone. Coral bleaching events will have detrimental impacts on host sea anemones and the symbionts as a result of climate change.
