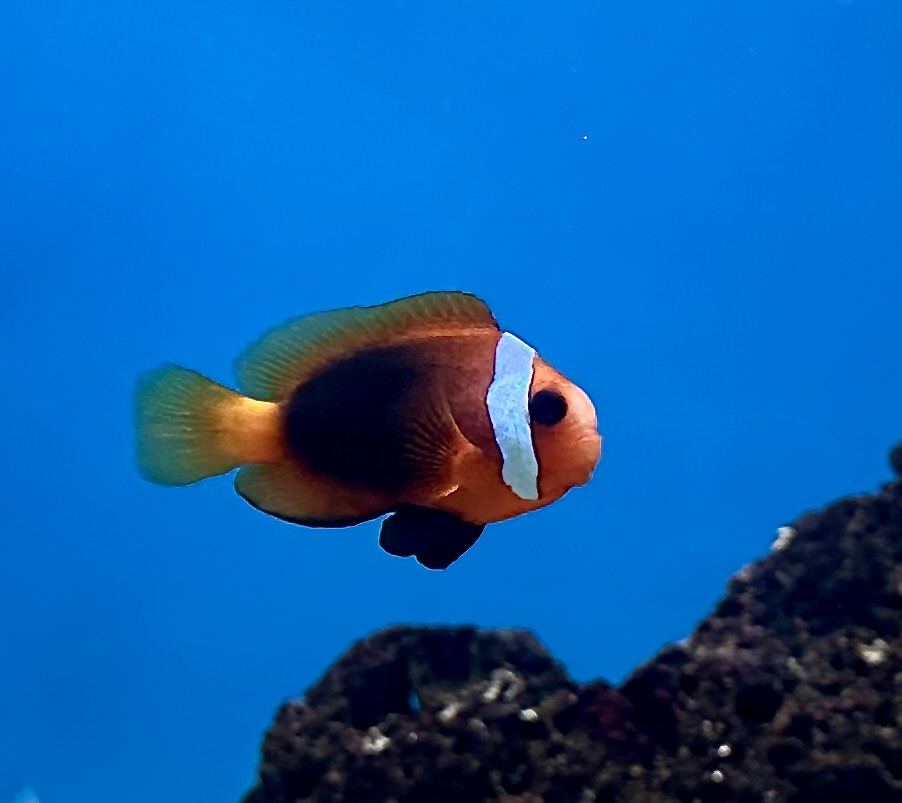
- A. melanopus in Entacmaea quadricolor

Conservation status
- Least Concern (IUCN 3.1)

Scientific classification
- Kingdom: Animalia
- Phylum: Chordata
- Class: Actinopterygii
- Order: Blenniiformes
- Family: Pomacentridae
- Genus: Amphiprion
- Species: A. melanopus

Binomial name
- Amphiprion melanopus Bleeker, 1852

Synonyms
- Amphiprion monofasciatus Thiollière, 1857; Prochilus macrostoma Bleeker, 1877; Amphiprion arion De Vis, 1884; Amphiprion verweyi Whitley, 1933

= Cinnamon clownfish =

Species of fish

Amphiprion melanopus, also known as the cinnamon clownfish, fire clownfish, red and black anemonefish, black-backed anemonefish or dusky anemonefish is a widely distributed anemonefish chiefly found in the western and southern parts of the Pacific Ocean.. The species scientific name 'melanopus' is Greek, meaning black feet in reference to the black pelvic fins. Like all anemonefishes it forms a symbiotic mutualism with sea anemones and is unaffected by the stinging tentacles of the host anemone. It is a sequential hermaphrodite with a strict sized based dominance hierarchy: the female is largest, the breeding male is second largest, and the male non-breeders get progressively smaller as the hierarchy descends. They exhibit protandry, meaning the breeding male will change to female if the sole breeding female dies, with the largest non-breeder becomes the breeding male.

== Description ==
A. melanopus adults can grow to 12 cm (4.7 inches). The body of A. melanopus is a dark red to orange with mahogany sides. Juveniles and adults have a white head band, which is wide and starts behind the eye, which may gave a blue tint. The dorsal and caudal fins of the fish have a lighter color than the rest of the fish and can sometimes be a cinnamon color. The pelvic and anal fins are usually black.

=== Similar species ===
Historically anemonefish have been identified by morphological features, color pattern in the field, while in a laboratory other features such as scalation of the head, tooth shape and body proportions. These features have been used to group species into 6 complexes. A. melanopus is in the tomato complex and so is similar to other members of the complex. A. rubrocinctus and A. melanopus are similar in appearance but geographically distinct with A. rubrocinctus limited to north western Australia. A. barberi was previously thought to be a geographic variation of A. melanopus and there are significant color-pattern differences, with A. melanopus having a dark brown or blackish body, compared to the red orange of A. barberi. A. melanopus also has 19-26 spines in the upper-opercular series while A. barberi has only 11–19.

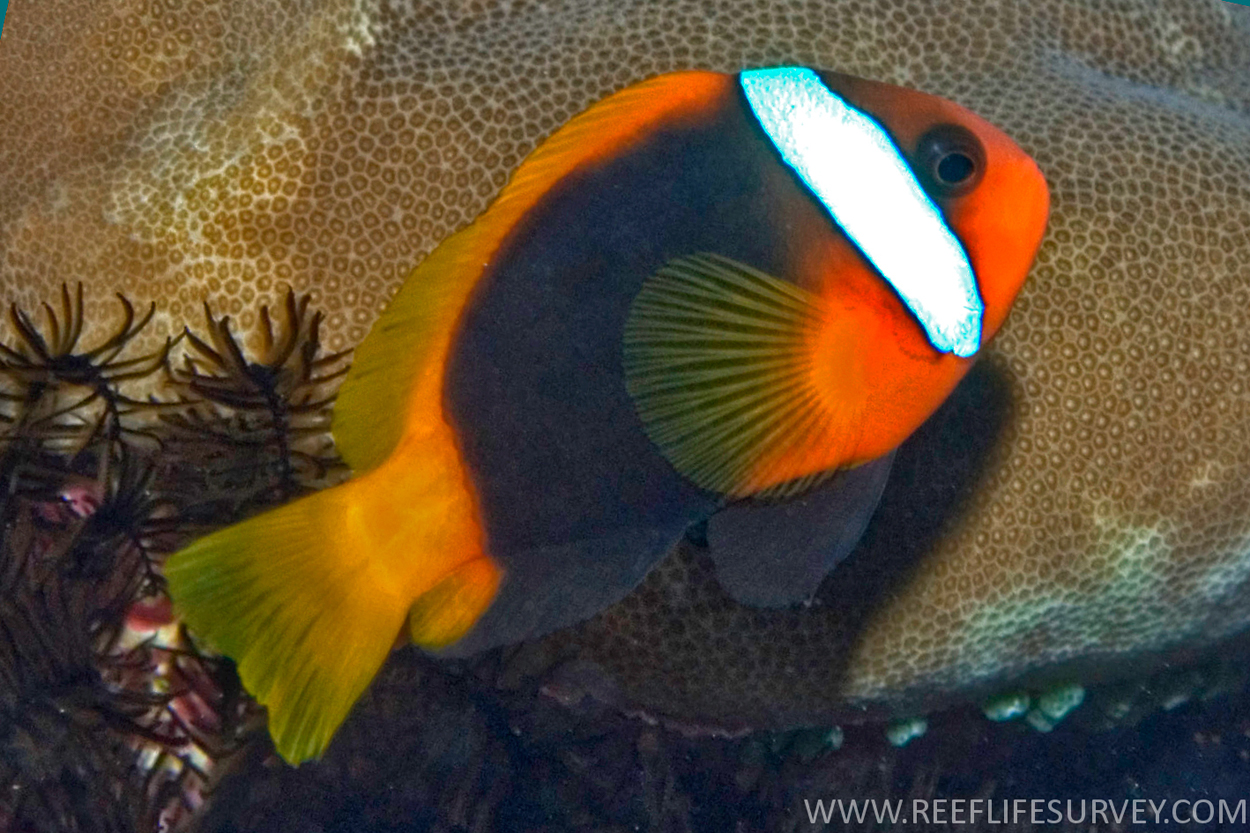
A. melanopus (Red & Black anemonefish)

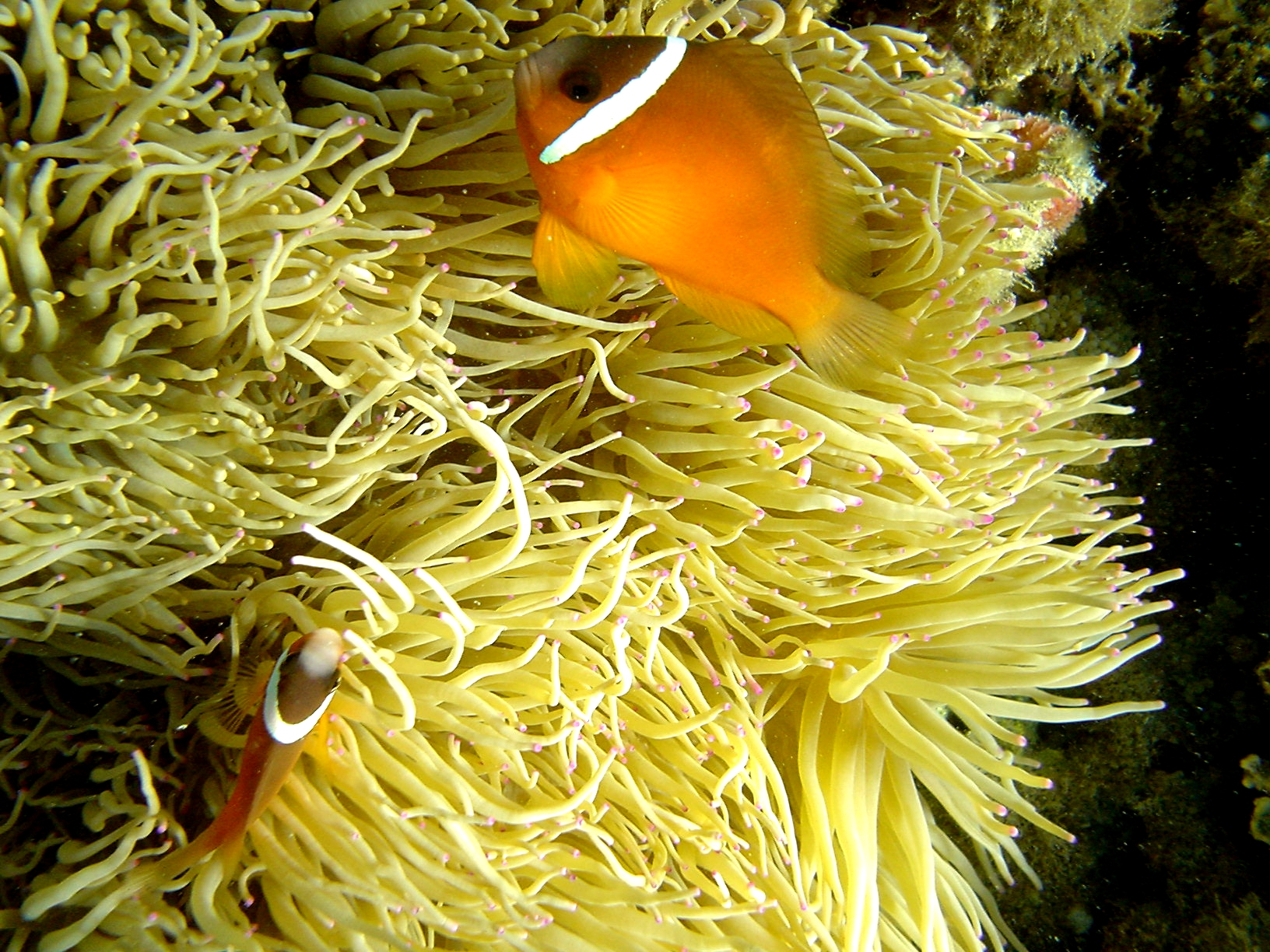
A. barberi (Barber's anemonefish)

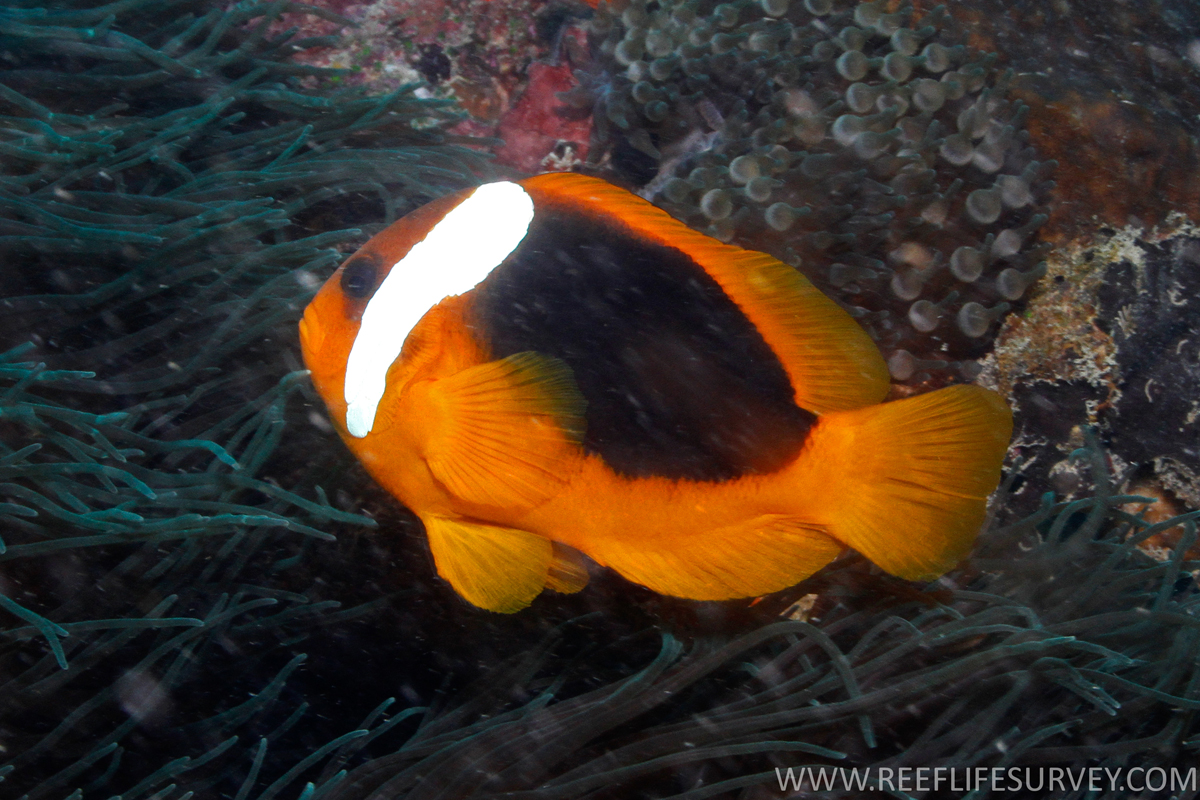
A. rubrocinctus (Australian anemonefish)

== Distribution and habitat ==
A. melanopus is widely distributed in the western Pacific, from the Great Barrier Reef north to the Marshall Islands and Guam, New Guinea and from Vanuatu and New Caledonia to eastern Indonesia. It was previously thought to be present in Fiji, Tonga, and the Samoan Islands, however that fish has now been described as a separate species, A. barberi.

=== Host anemones ===
The relationship between anemonefish and their host sea anemones is not random and instead is highly nested in structure. A. melanopus is a generalist, being usually hosted by 1 anemone, but also hosted by 2 other anemones. It is hosted by the following 3 out of the 10 host anemones:

- Entacmaea quadricolor - bubble-tip or purple base anemone (usually)
- Heteractis crispa - leathery sea anemone (occasionally)
- Heteractis magnifica - magnificent sea anemone (rarely)
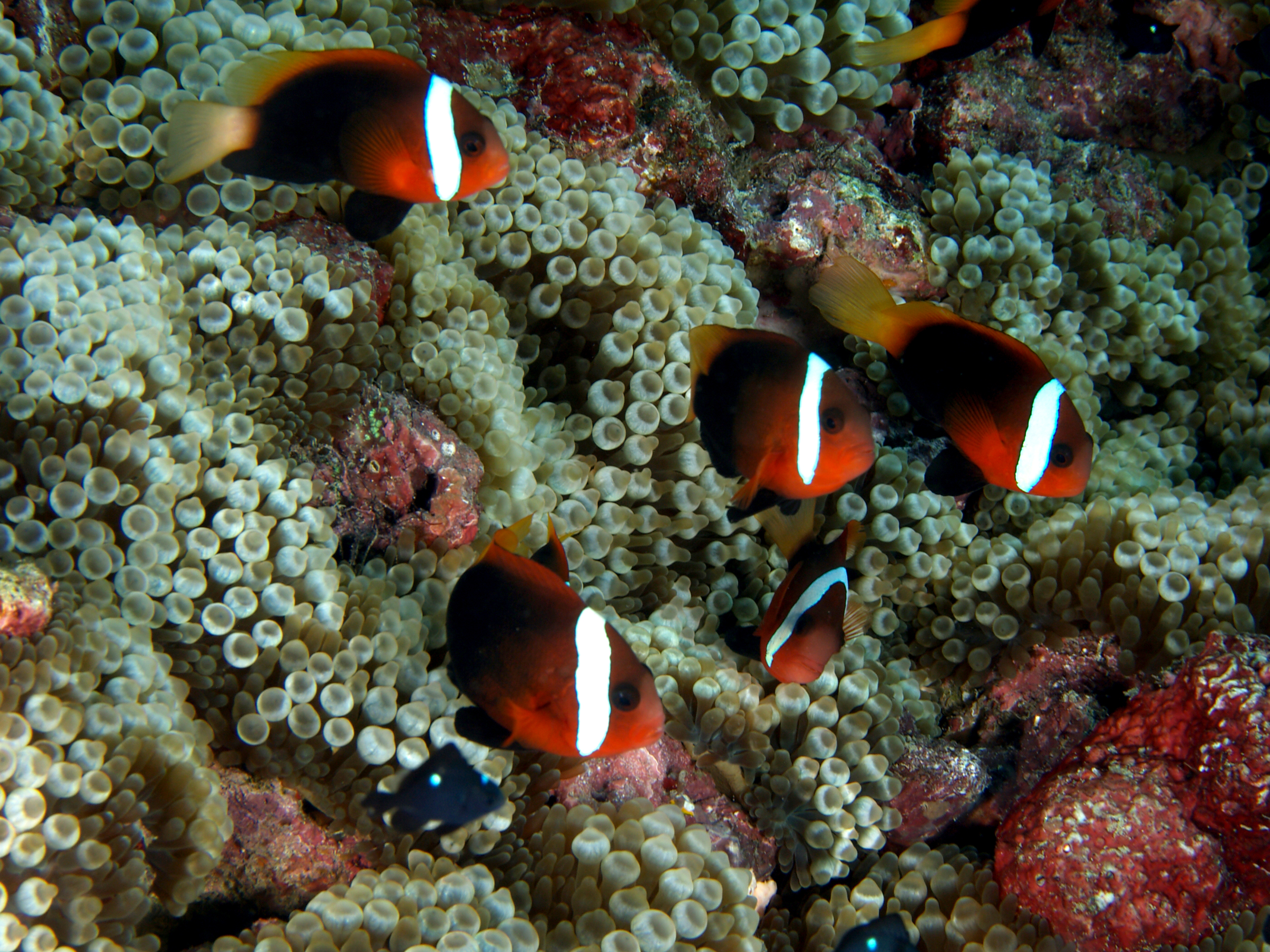
A. melanopus Entacmaea quadricolor (Bubble tip anemone)

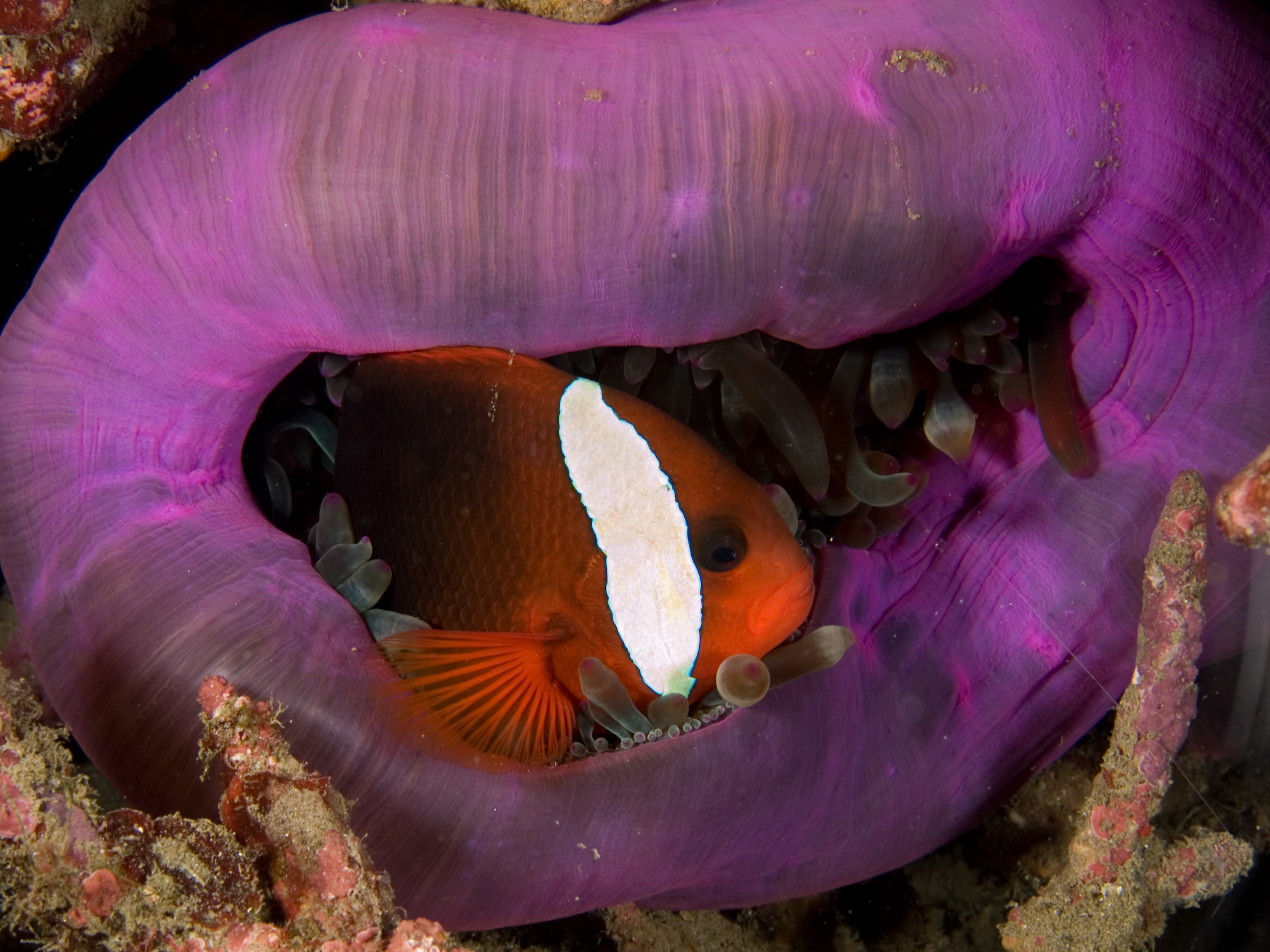
A. melanopus in Heteractis magnifica - magnificent sea anemone

=== Diet ===
Like all anemonefish, A. melanopus is omnivorous and its diet is based on zooplankton, small benthic crustaceans and algaes.

== Conservation status ==
Anemonefish and their host anemones are found on coral reefs and face similar environmental issues. Like corals, anemone's contain intracellular endosymbionts, zooxanthellae, and can suffer from bleaching due to triggers such as increased water temperature or acidification. The other threat to anemonefish is collection for the marine aquarium trade where anemonefish make up 43% of the global marine ornamental trade, and 25% of the global trade comes from fish bred in captivity, while the majority are captured from the wild, accounting for decreased densities in exploited areas. While bleaching is a significant threat to anemonefish and their host anemones, there is evidence suggesting that collection compounds the localised impact of bleaching. This species was not evaluated in the 2012 release of the IUCN Red List

== In aquaria ==
The species has successfully been bred in an aquarium. It may move or cover corals with sand. A. melanopus may become territorial and aggressive once established in a tank. This fish will accept a variety of foods in the aquarium, including flakes, brine shrimp, mysid shrimp, algae, and pellets.
