= Les Kaufman =

American evolutionary ecologist specializing in aquatic ecosystems

Les Kaufman is an evolutionary ecologist and conservation biologist specializing in the biology and conservation of aquatic ecosystems. He has special expertise in coral reef biology, the evolution and ecology of tropical great lakes fishes, and ecosystem-based management of marine resources.

Kaufman received his Bachelor of Science and Ph.D. degrees in evolutionary ecology from Johns Hopkins University, receiving his Ph.D. in 1980. He is based in Boston as a Professor of Biology in the Boston University Marine Program, where he leads interdisciplinary work on systems ecology and Coupled Human and Natural Systems (CHANS). He conducted post-doctoral research at the Harvard Museum of Comparative Zoology from 1980 to 1983, where he remains an Associate in Ichthyology. Kaufman worked full-time with the New England Aquarium from 1983 through 1994, serving as Curator of Education, Curator of Exhibit Research and Development, and Chief Scientist. Since 2005 he worked as a senior marine scientist and PI for the Marine Management Areas Science Program (www.science2action.org), and since 2012 as Marine Conservation Fellow in the Betty and Gordon Moore Center for Science.

Kaufman has conducted research on coral reefs all over the world, including in the Caribbean and Indo-Pacific. He has published numerous scientific papers on the ecology of coral reefs, as well as on the conservation of marine biodiversity. In addition to his research, Kaufman has been involved in numerous conservation initiatives, including working to establish marine protected areas and to reduce the impact of overfishing on coral reef ecosystems. He has received many honors and awards for his work, including a Pew Marine Conservation Fellowship.

Kaufman is active in public education and outreach, occasionally involved in the production of popular articles, television, and radio for venues such as National Geographic, Ranger Rick, and the National Public Broadcasting System. He has taken part in four saturation diving missions at the Aquarius underwater laboratory, where he has also performed underwater surgery on fish to implant electronic acoustic tags inside them.
