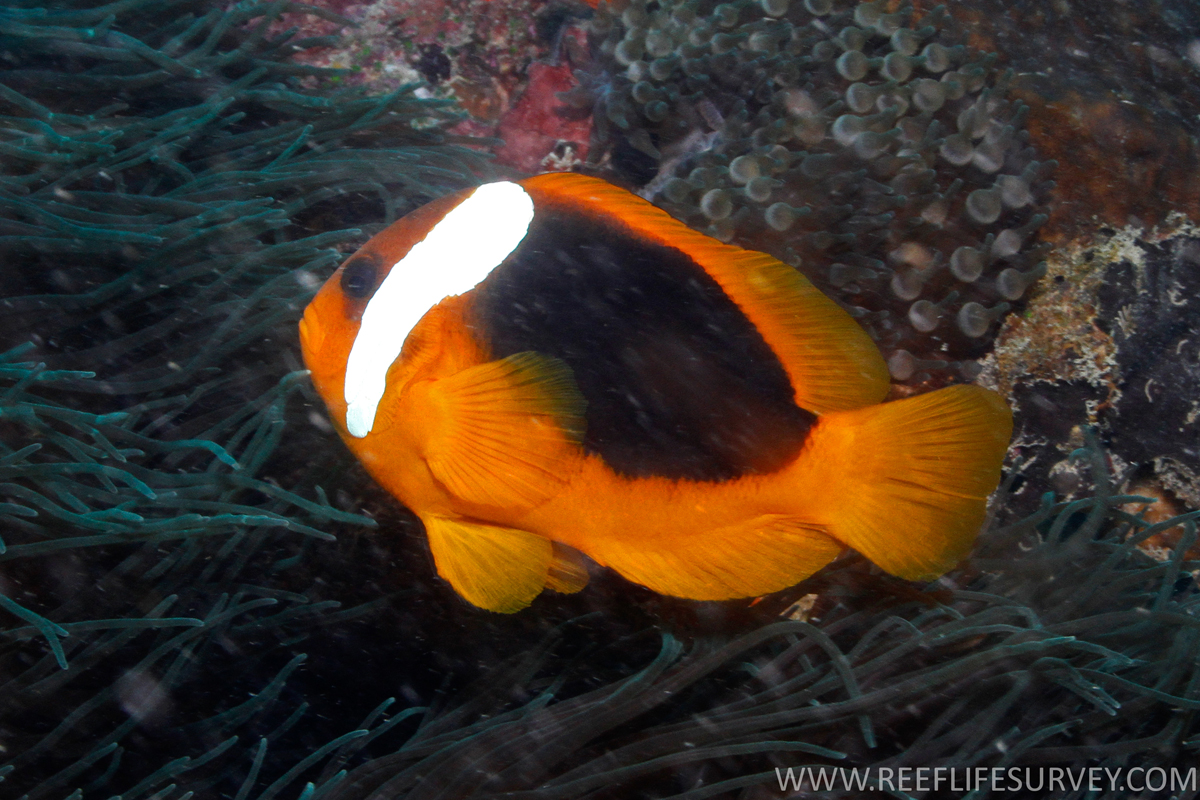

Conservation status
- Least Concern (IUCN 3.1)

Scientific classification
- Kingdom: Animalia
- Phylum: Chordata
- Class: Actinopterygii
- Order: Blenniiformes
- Family: Pomacentridae
- Genus: Amphiprion
- Species: A. rubrocinctus

Binomial name
- Amphiprion rubrocinctus Richardson, 1842

Synonyms
- Amphiprion tricolor Günther, 1862; Amphiprion ruppelii Castelnau, 1873

= Australian clownfish =

Species of fish

Amphiprion rubrocinctus, also known as the Australian clownfish or red anemonefish, is a species of anemonefish that is endemic to north west Australia. Like all anemonefishes it forms a symbiotic mutualism with sea anemones and is unaffected by the stinging tentacles of the host anemone. It is a sequential hermaphrodite with a strict sized based dominance hierarchy: the female is largest, the breeding male is second largest, and the male non-breeders get progressively smaller as the hierarchy descends. They exhibit protandry, meaning the breeding male will change to female if the sole breeding female dies, with the largest non-breeder becomes the breeding male. The fish's natural diet includes zooplankton.

== Description ==
The side of A. rubrocinctus has blackish or dark brown sides with red snout, breast, belly and fins. it has a single white head bar that is often poorly developed and lacking a pronounced black margin.

=== Color variations ===
Some anemonefish species have color variations based on geographic location, sex and host anemone. A. rubrocinctus does not show any of these variations.

=== Similar species ===
A. rubrocinctus is included in the tomato complex and so has similarities with other species in this complex. A. frenatus is similar however males are entirely bright red and the white head bar is more vivid on females. A. barberi was originally thought to be a geographic color variation of A. rubrocinctus but was described as a separate species in 2008. A. barberi lacks the dark brown or black sides and is geographically distinct. A. rubrocinctus is easily distinguished from the 4 other species of anemonefish commonly found within its range. A. perideraion and A. sandaracinos have a distinctive white stripe along the dorsal ridge while A. clarkii and A. ocellaris each have 3 white bars.

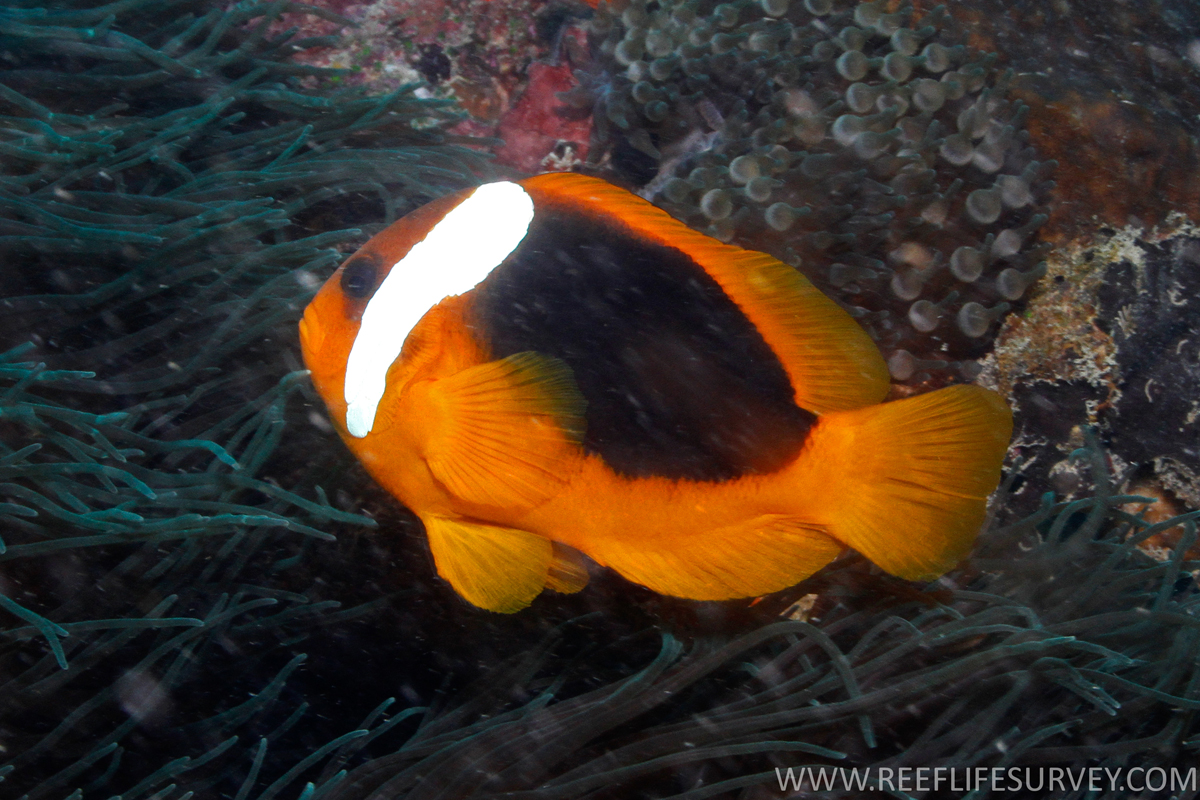
A. rubrocinctus (Australian anemonefish)

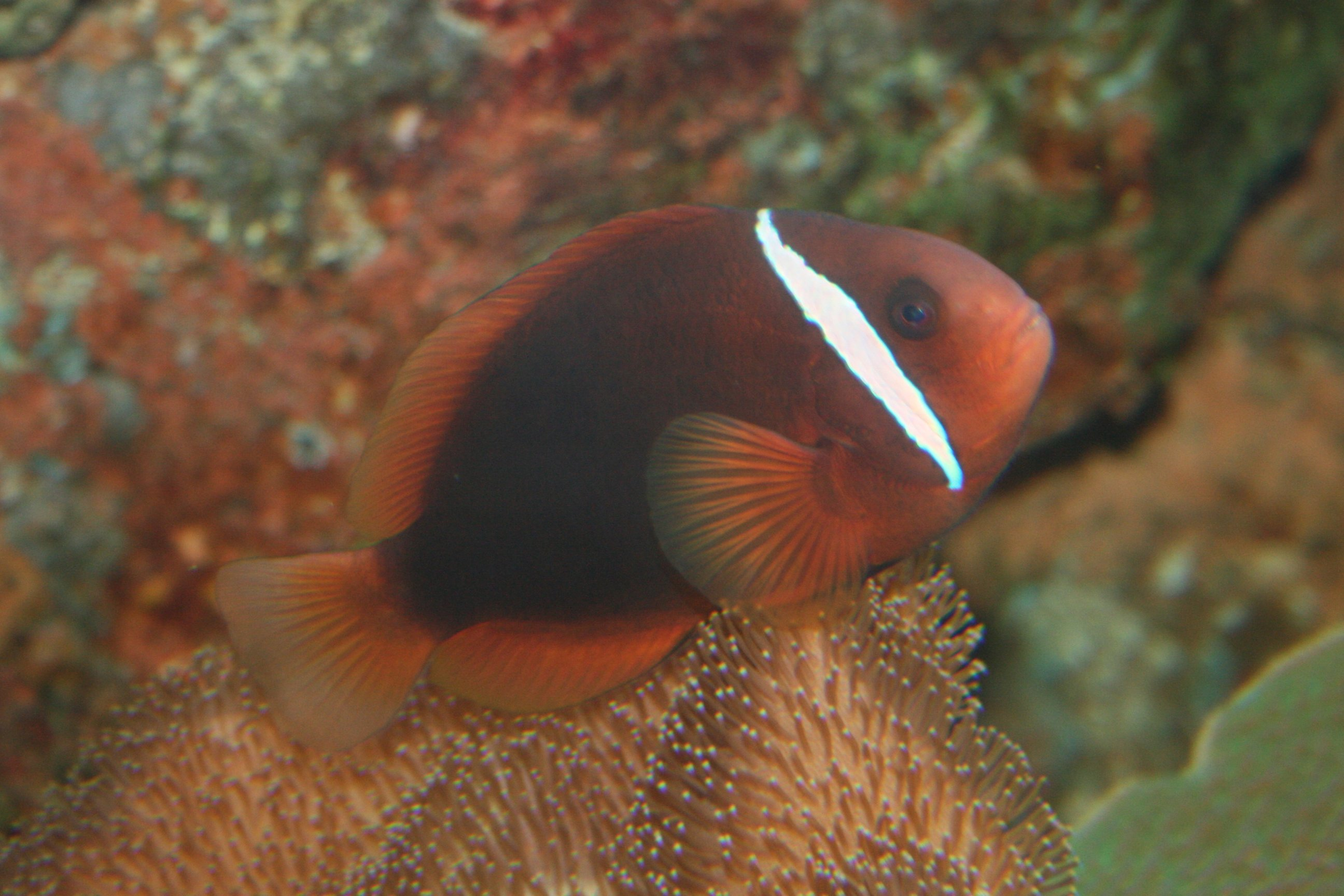
A. frenatus (Tomato anemonefish)

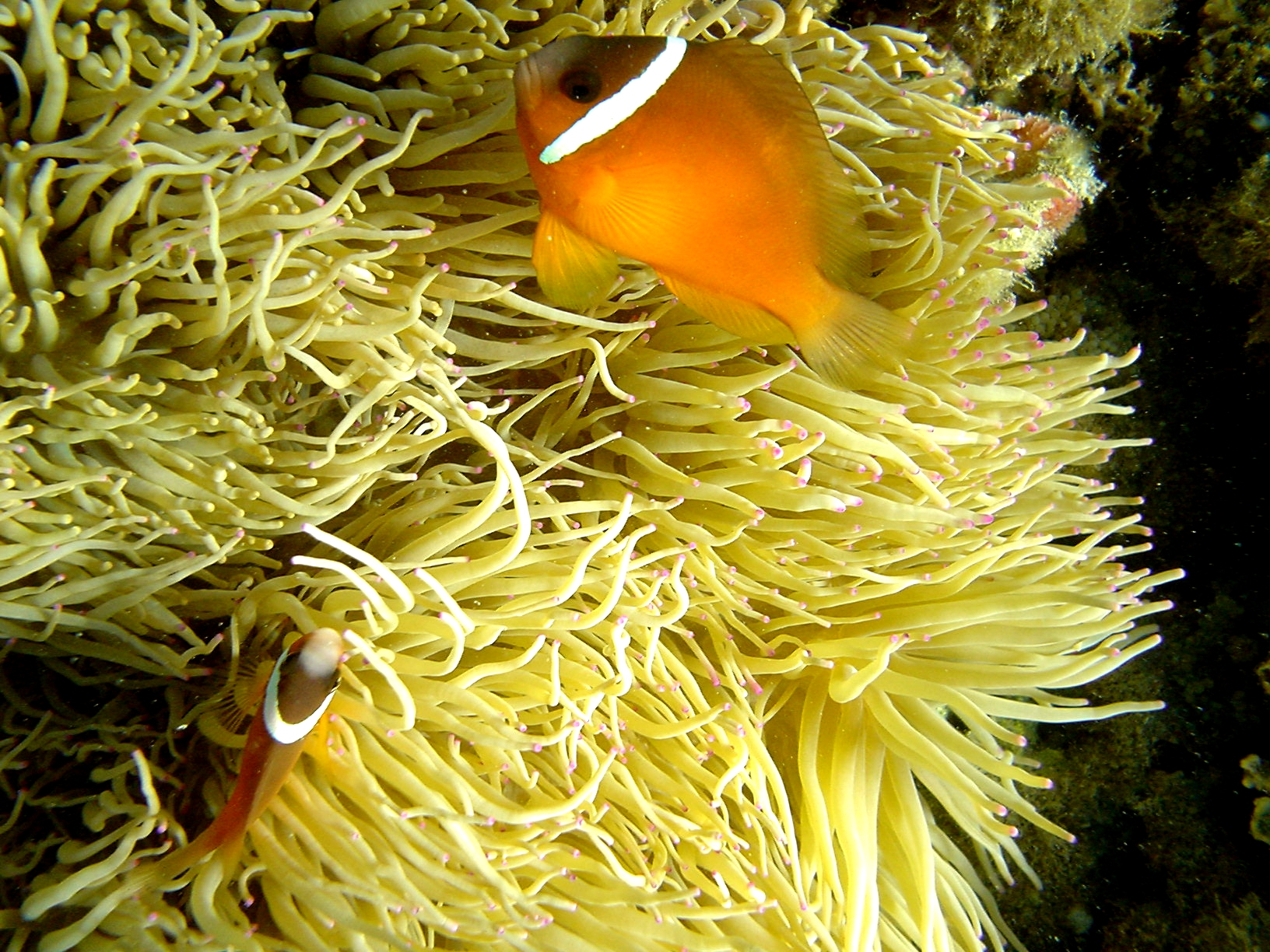
A. barberi (Barber's anemonefish)

== Distribution and habitat ==
A. rubrocinctus is only found in the tropical seas of north west Australia, from Ningaloo Reef, Western Australia, to Groote Eylandt in the Gulf of Carpentaria, Northern Territory.

=== Host anemones ===
The relationship between anemonefish and their host sea anemones is not random and instead is highly nested in structure. A. rubrocinctus is specialised, being hosted by only 2 out of the 9 host anemones found within its range. A. rubrocinctus is hosted by the following species of anemone:

- Entacmaea quadricolor Bubble-tip anemone (usually)
- Stichodactyla gigantea giant carpet anemone

== Conservation status ==
Anemonefish and their host anemones are found on coral reefs and face similar environmental issues. Like corals, anemones contain intracellular endosymbionts, zooxanthellae, and can suffer from bleaching due to triggers such as increased water temperature or acidification. Characteristics known to elevate the risk of extinction are small geographic range, small local population and extreme habitat specialisation. A. rubrocinctus has only one of these characteristics, being a small geographic range and its ability to use two different anemone hosts may reduce the risk of extinction associated with extreme specialisation. This species was not evaluated in the 2012 release of the IUCN Red List. The Northern Territory Department of Land Resource Management has listed the species as being of least concern.
