= Corrugated =

The term corrugated, describing a series of parallel ridges and furrows, may refer to the following:

== Materials ==
- Corrugated fiberboard, also called corrugated cardboard
- Corrugated galvanised iron, a building material composed of sheets of cold-rolled hot-dip galvanised mild steel
- Corrugated plastic, a wide range of extruded twinwall plastic-sheet products produced from high-impact polypropylene resin
- Corrugated stainless steel tubing, tubing made of stainless steel with corrugation on the inside or outside

== Animals ==
- Corrugated darter, a species of fish endemic to the eastern United States
- Corrugated pipefish, a marine fish of the family Syngnathidae
- Corrugated frog, a species of frog in the family Dicroglossidae
- Corrugated water frog, a species of frog in the family Nyctibatrachidae
- Corrugated nutmeg, a species of sea snail

== Other uses ==
- Corrugaphone or whirly tube, an experimental musical instrument or toy
- Corrugated road, a form of damage prone to develop in the surface of unpaved roads, see washboarding
- U.S. Corrugated, an independent corrugated packaging producer headquartered in the United States

== See also ==
- Corrugator (disambiguation)
