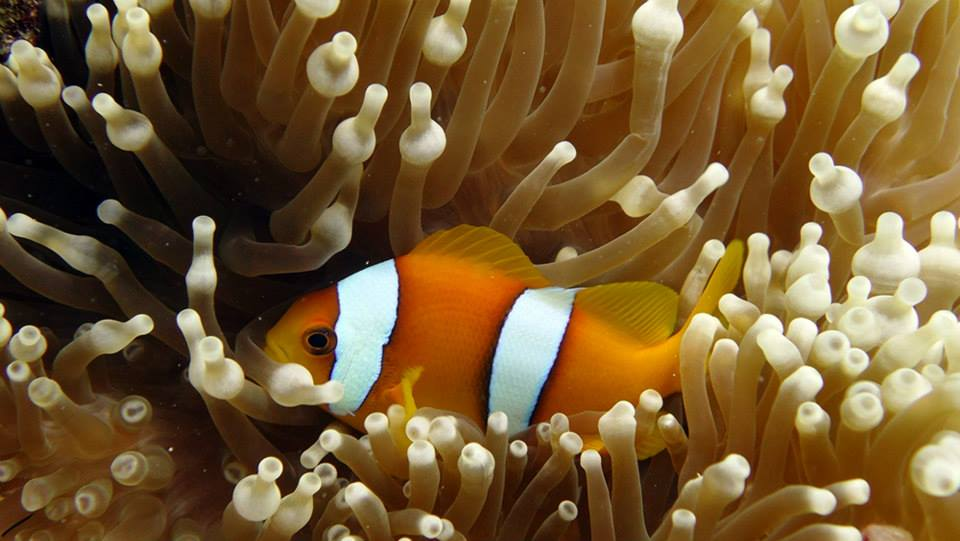

Conservation status
- Least Concern (IUCN 3.1)

Scientific classification
- Kingdom: Animalia
- Phylum: Chordata
- Class: Actinopterygii
- Order: Blenniiformes
- Family: Pomacentridae
- Genus: Amphiprion
- Species: A. chagosensis

Binomial name
- Amphiprion chagosensis (Allen, 1972)

= Amphiprion chagosensis =

Species of fish

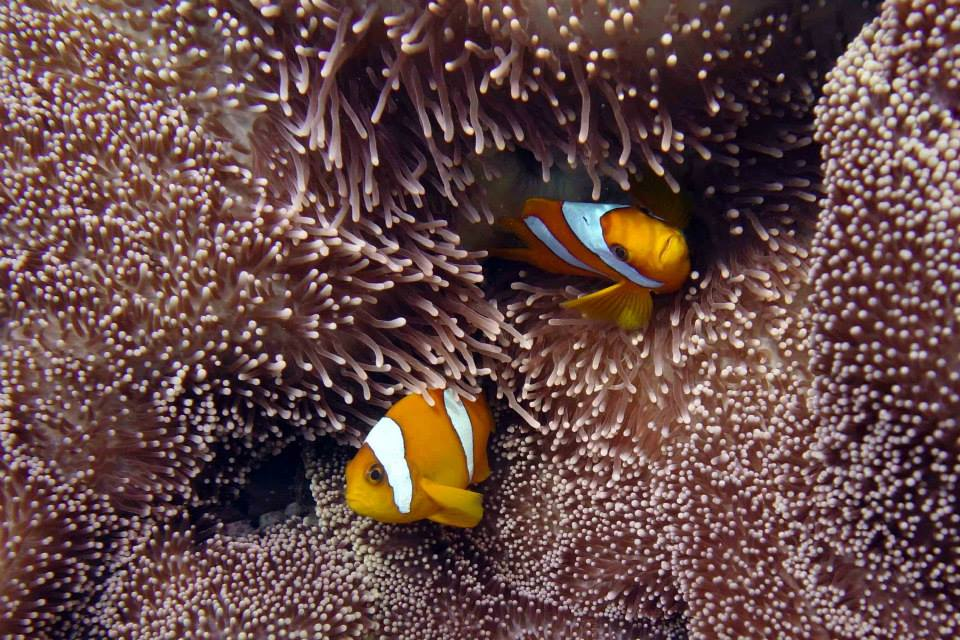
A. chagosensis, with Stichodactyla mertensii, Mertens' carpet sea anemone

Amphiprion chagosensis, the Chagos anemonefish, is a marine fish belonging to the family Pomacentridae, the clownfishes and damselfishes. It is named for the Chagos Archipelago in the Indian Ocean and it is endemic to the archipelago. The original specimens were collected at Diego Garcia Atoll, Chagos Archipelago.

== Characteristics of anemonefish ==
Clownfish or anemonefish are fishes that, in the wild, form symbiotic mutualisms with sea anemones and are unaffected by the stinging tentacles of the host anemone, see Amphiprioninae § Mutualism. The sea anemone protects the clownfish from predators, as well as providing food through the scraps left from the anemone's meals and occasional dead anemone tentacles. In return, the clownfish defends the anemone from its predators, and parasites. Clownfish are small-sized, 10–18 centimetres (3.9–7.1 in), and depending on species, they are overall yellow, orange, or a reddish or blackish color, and many show white bars or patches. Within species, there may be color variations, most commonly according to distribution, but also based on sex, age and host anemone. Clownfish are found in warmer waters of the Indian and Pacific oceans and the Red Sea in sheltered reefs or in shallow lagoons.

In a group of clownfish, there is a strict dominance hierarchy. The largest and most aggressive fish is female and is found at the top. Only two clownfish, a male and a female, in a group reproduce through external fertilization. Clownfish are sequential hermaphrodites, meaning that they develop into males first, and when they mature, they become females.

== Description ==
Adults are light brown with two white bars with dark edging encircling the body. All fins are dusky brown. They have 10-11 dorsal spines, 2 anal spines, 15-17 dorsal soft rays and 13-14 anal soft rays. They reach a maximum length of 10 cm (4 in).

=== Color variations ===
None known.

=== Similar species ===
The Chagos anemonefish is mainly distinguished by location, with similar species mostly having a geographic separation, with A. akindynos being found on the Great Barrier Reef and Coral Sea and A. allardi in East Africa. A. bicinctus is found in the Red Sea but has an overlapping distribution at Chagos. A. chagosensis has a narrower headbar and a whiteish caudal fin. Specimens can also be distinguished by differences in predorsal scalation.

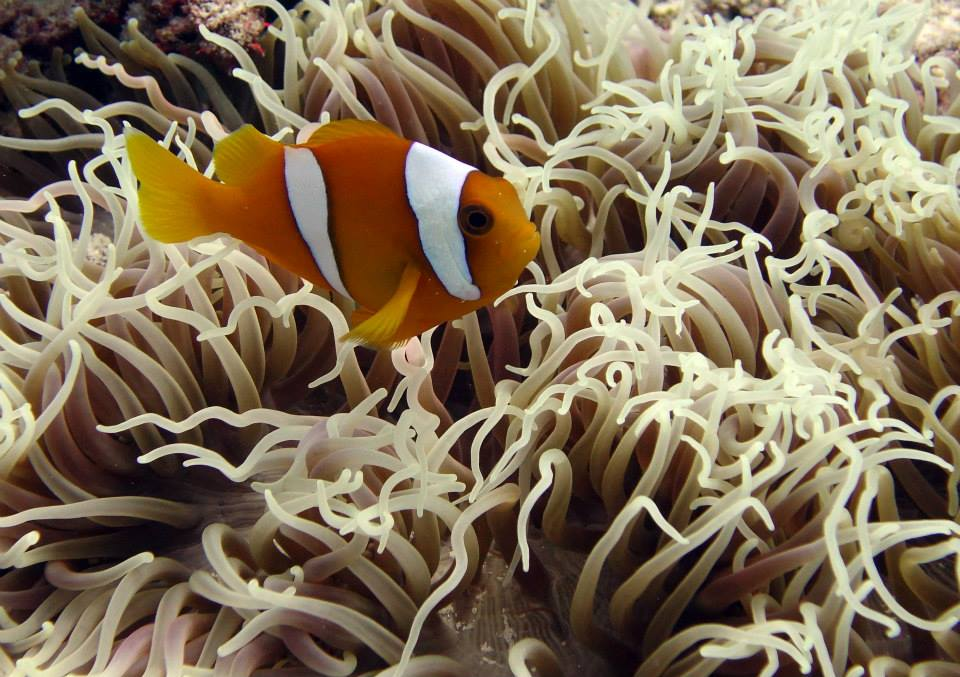
A. chagosensis, with Macrodactyla doreensis, long tentacle anemone

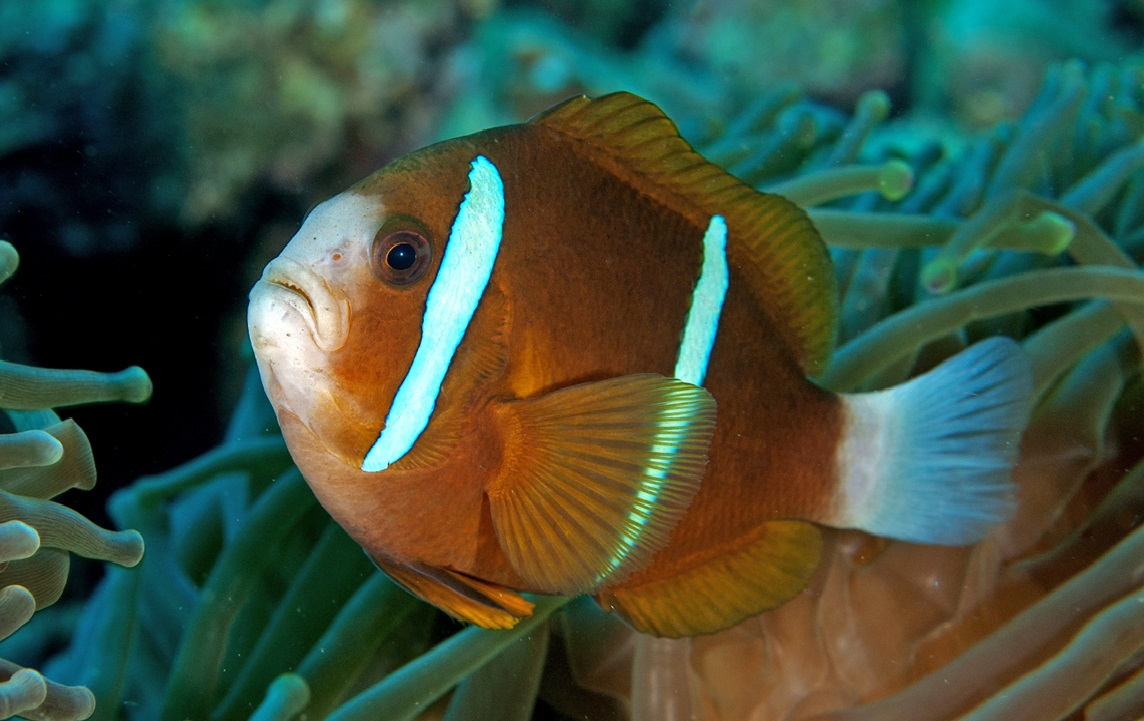
A. akindynos (Barrier Reef anemonefish)

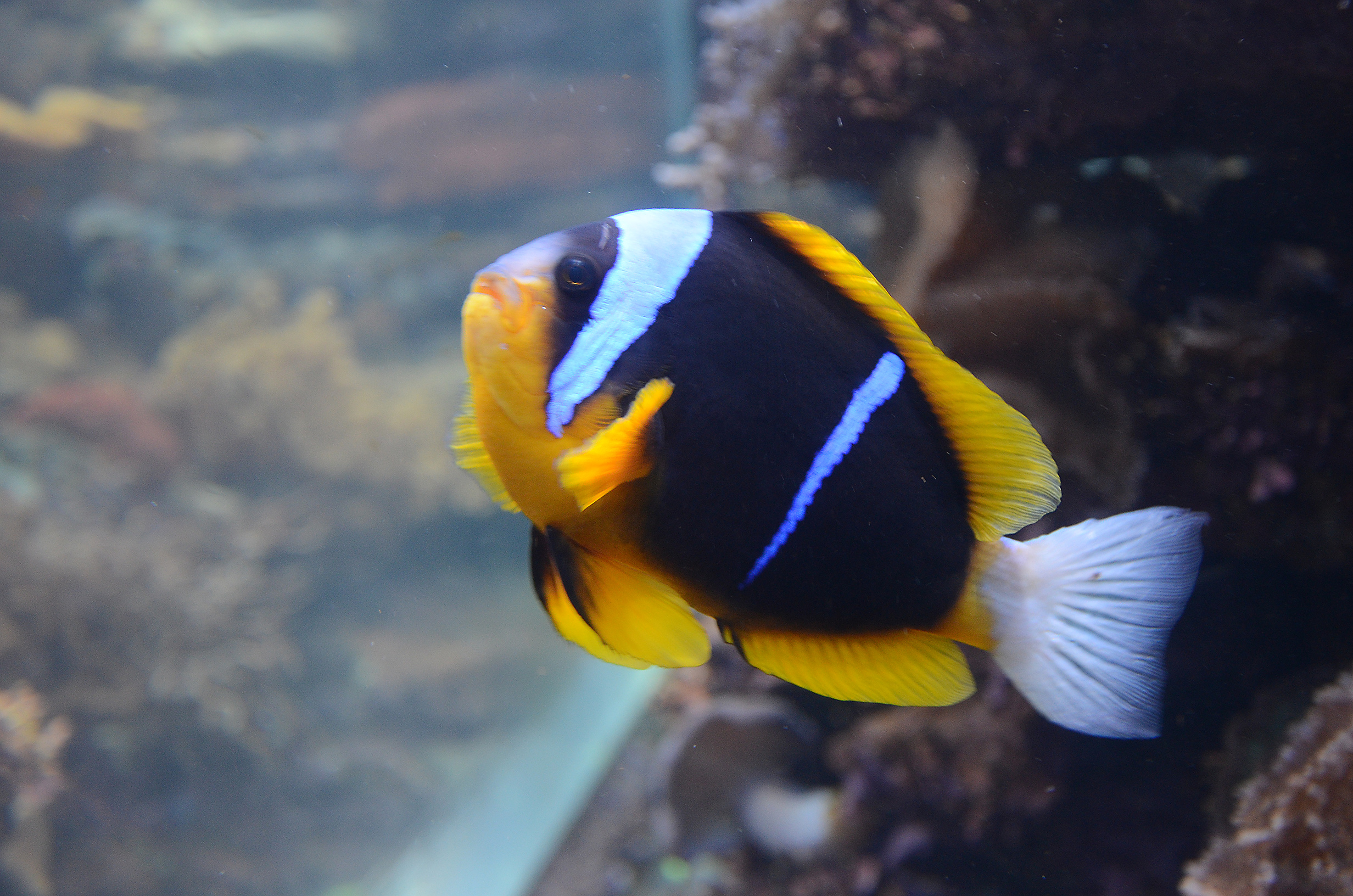
A. allardi (Allard's anemonefish).

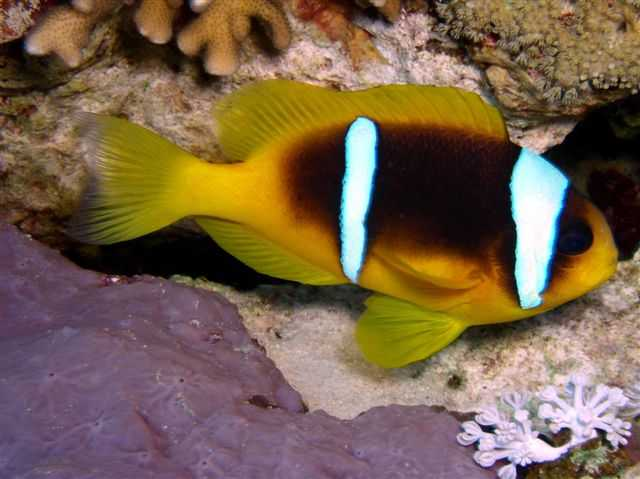
A. bicinctus (Two-band anemonefish)

== Distribution and habitat ==
A. chagosensis is found only in the Chagos Archipelago.

=== Host anemones ===
Little is known about the specific host anemone species with which A. chagosensis associates, however it has been photographed in association with:

- Entacmaea quadricolor Bubble-tip anemone
- Heteractis magnifica magnificent sea anemone
- Macrodactyla doreensis long tentacle anemone
- Stichodactyla mertensii Mertens' carpet sea anemone
