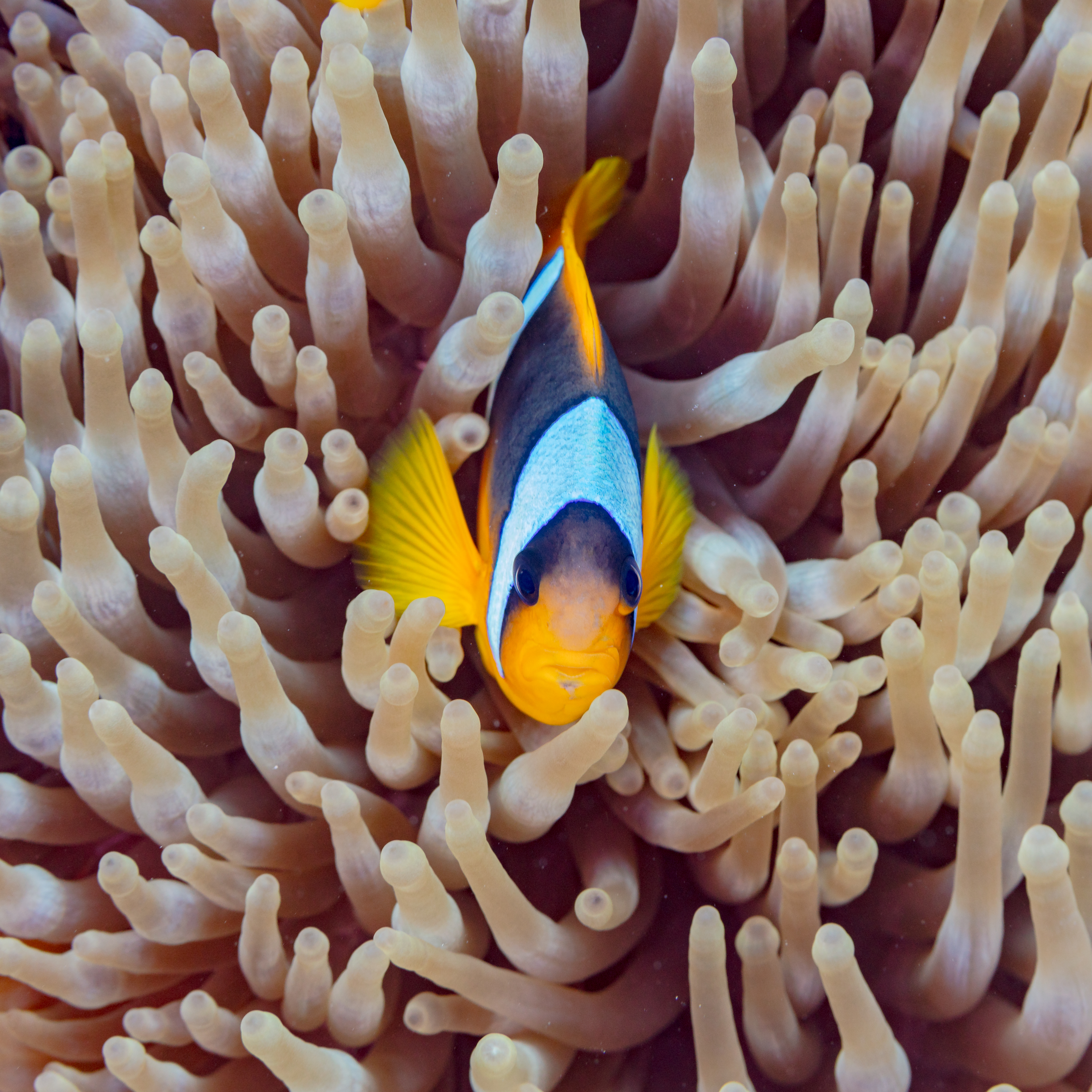
- In Heteractis magnifica

Conservation status
- Least Concern (IUCN 3.1)

Scientific classification
- Kingdom: Animalia
- Phylum: Chordata
- Class: Actinopterygii
- Order: Blenniiformes
- Family: Pomacentridae
- Genus: Amphiprion
- Species: A. bicinctus

Binomial name
- Amphiprion bicinctus Rüppell, 1830
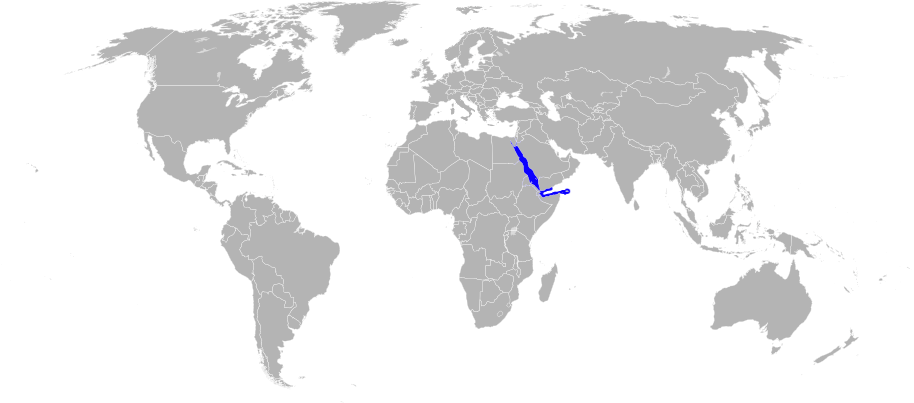

= Red Sea clownfish =

Species of fish

The Red Sea Clownfish (Amphiprion bicinctus, meaning "both sawlike with two stripes"), commonly known as the Red Sea or two-banded anemonefish is a marine fish belonging to the family Pomacentridae, the clownfishes and damselfishes. Like other species of the genus, the fish feeds on algae and zooplankton in the wild.

== Characteristics of Anemonefish ==
Clownfish or anemonefish are fishes that, in the wild, form symbiotic mutualisms with sea anemones and are unaffected by the stinging tentacles of the host anemone, see Amphiprioninae § Mutualism. The sea anemone protects the clownfish from predators, as well as providing food through the scraps left from the anemone's meals and occasional dead anemone tentacles. In return, the clownfish defends the anemone from its predators, and parasites. Clownfish are small-sized, 10–18 centimetres (3.9–7.1 in), and depending on species, they are overall yellow, orange, or a reddish or blackish color, and many show white bars or patches. Within species there may be color variations, most commonly according to distribution, but also based on sex, age and host anemone. Clownfish are found in warmer waters of the Indian and Pacific oceans and the Red Sea in sheltered reefs or in shallow lagoons.

In a group of clownfish, there is a strict dominance hierarchy. The largest and most aggressive fish is female and is found at the top. Only two clownfish, a male and a female, in a group reproduce through external fertilization. Clownfish are sequential hermaphrodites, meaning that they develop into males first, and when they mature, they become females.

== Description ==
The fish's body is yellow-orange to dark brown. As the name suggests, the two-banded anemonefish has two white bands or bars, with black edges. The head-bar considerably wider. They have 9-10 dorsal spines, 2 anal spines, 15-17 dorsal soft rays and 13-14 anal soft rays. Males grow to a length of 10 centimetres (3.9 in), and females grow to a length of 14 centimetres (5.5 in).

=== Color variation ===
The principal variation is that the body can be yellow-orange to dark brown.

=== Similar species ===
A pattern of two white bars is common to species within the clarkii complex sub genus. The yellow caudal fin of A. bicinctus distinguishes it from all but A. latifasciatus and some variations of A. clarkii, however A. clarkii has a white base with a sharp demarcation between light and dark. A. latifasciatus has a much wider mid-body bar and forked caudal fin. The caudal fin on A. allardi and A. chagosensis is white or whitish.

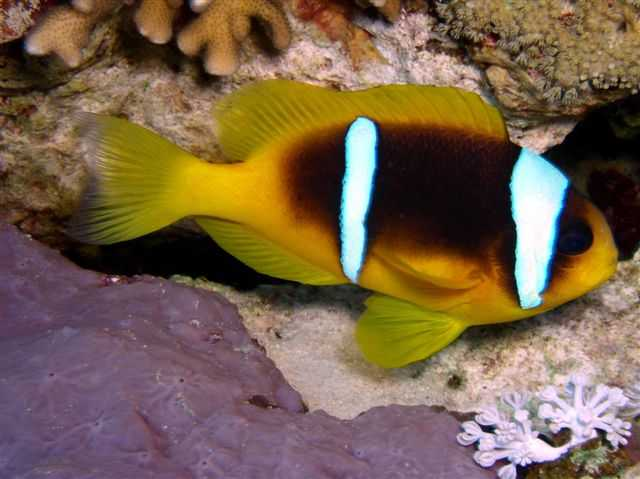
A. bicinctus (Two-band anemonefish)

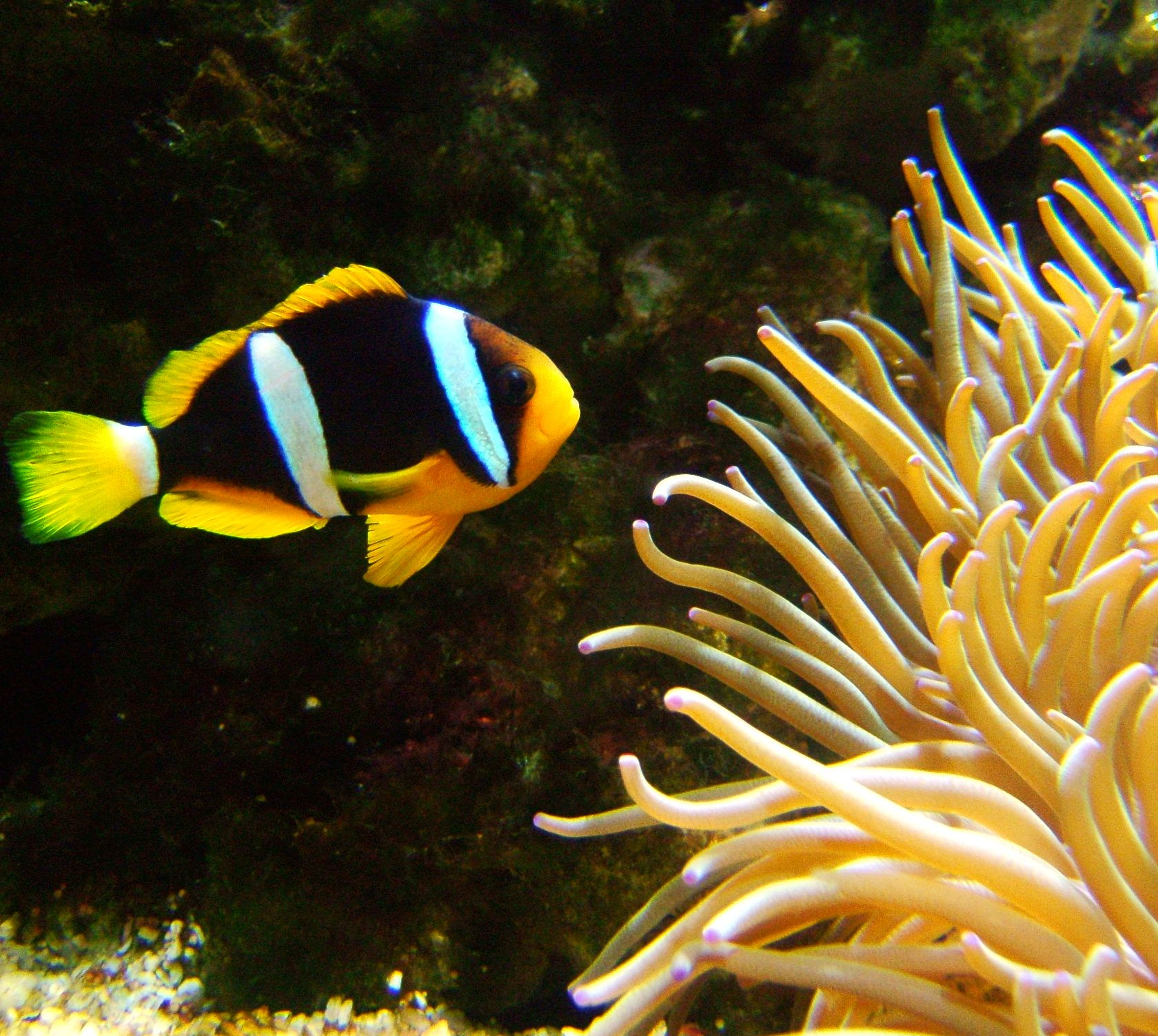
A. clarkii (Clark's anemonefish) with a yellow tail & white base

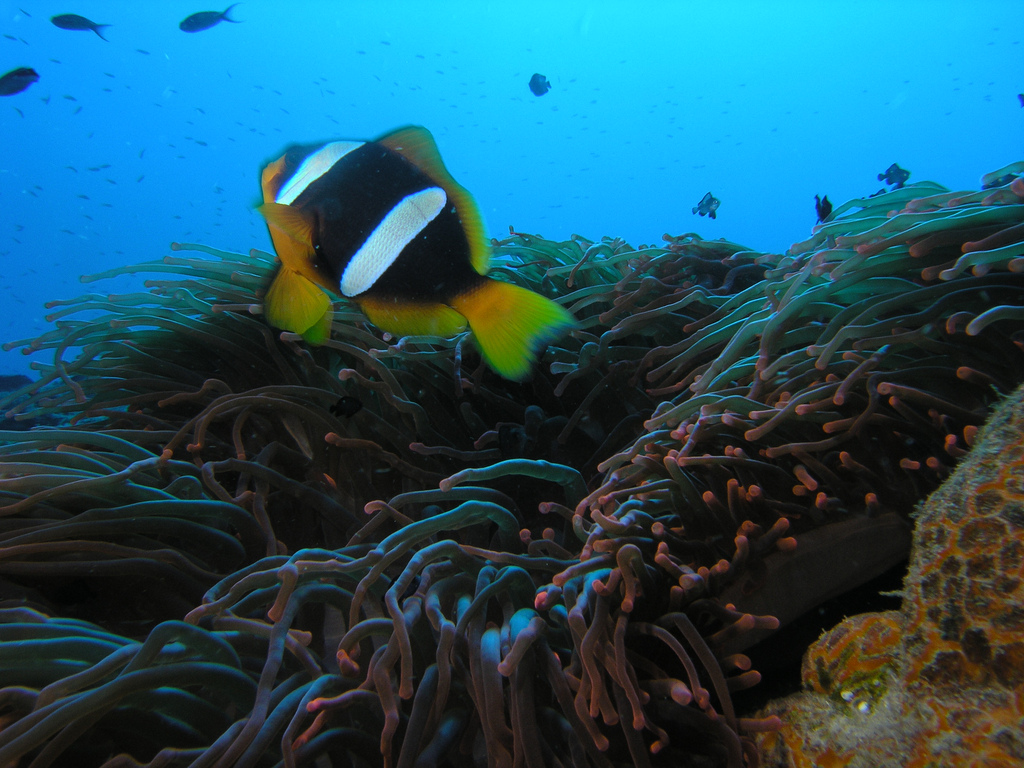
A. latifasciatus (Madagascar anemonefish) showing the distinctive forked tail.

== Distribution and habitat ==
The species is found in the Western Indian Ocean, the Red Sea, Socotra and the Chagos Archipelago.

=== Host anemones ===
The relationship between anemonefish and their host sea anemones is not random, instead being highly nested in structure. A. bicinctus is generalist, being hosted by the following 5 species of anemones:

- Entacmaea quadricolor Bubble-tip anemone
- Heteractis aurora white beaded anemone
- Heteractis crispa Sebae anemone
- Heteractis magnifica magnificent sea anemone
- Stichodactyla gigantea giant carpet anemone

Studies conducted in the northern Red Sea have demonstrated that A. bicinctus has a preference for E. quadricolor over H. crispa and sexually mature fish are rarely hosted by H. crispa. In 2005, anemone density was found to affect whether H. crispa hosted anemonefish, with clusters of juvenile fish only found at low density sites, while either 1 or no juvenile anemonefish were found in H. crispa at the high density site. The authors theorised that H. crispa was a nursery anemone due to being unable to adequately protect adult anemonefish from predation, active emigration of fish to E. quadricolor and/or environmentally-controlled cessation of fish growth. A subsequent study in 2012 tested the nursery theory and concluded that the sea anemone H. crispa was a less-preferred host than E. quadricolor, and that fish preference appeared to be the result of body size, morphology, and behavior of the host.

== Images ==
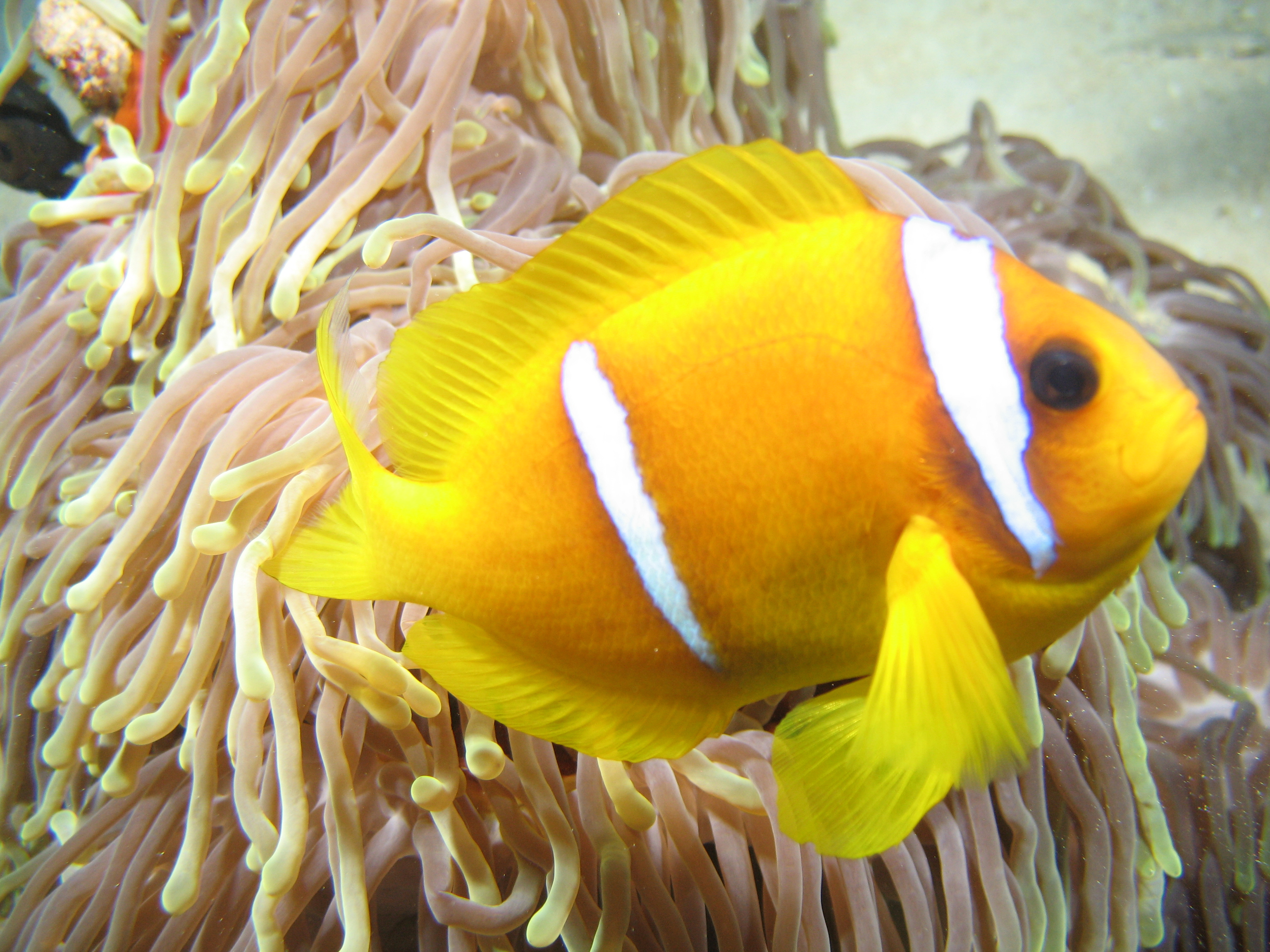
Amphiprion bicinctus near Marsa Alam

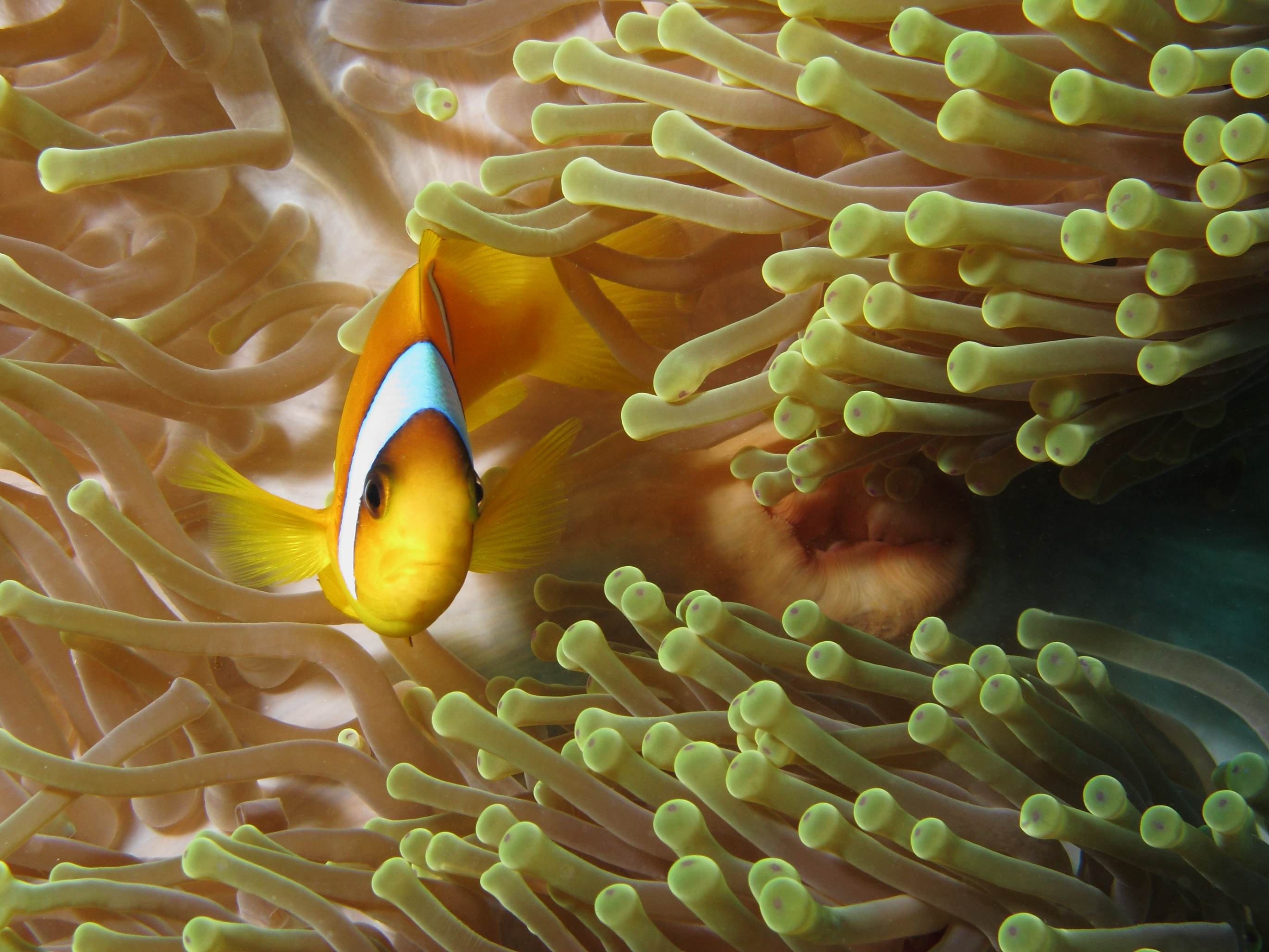
Twoband anemonefish in the Red Sea

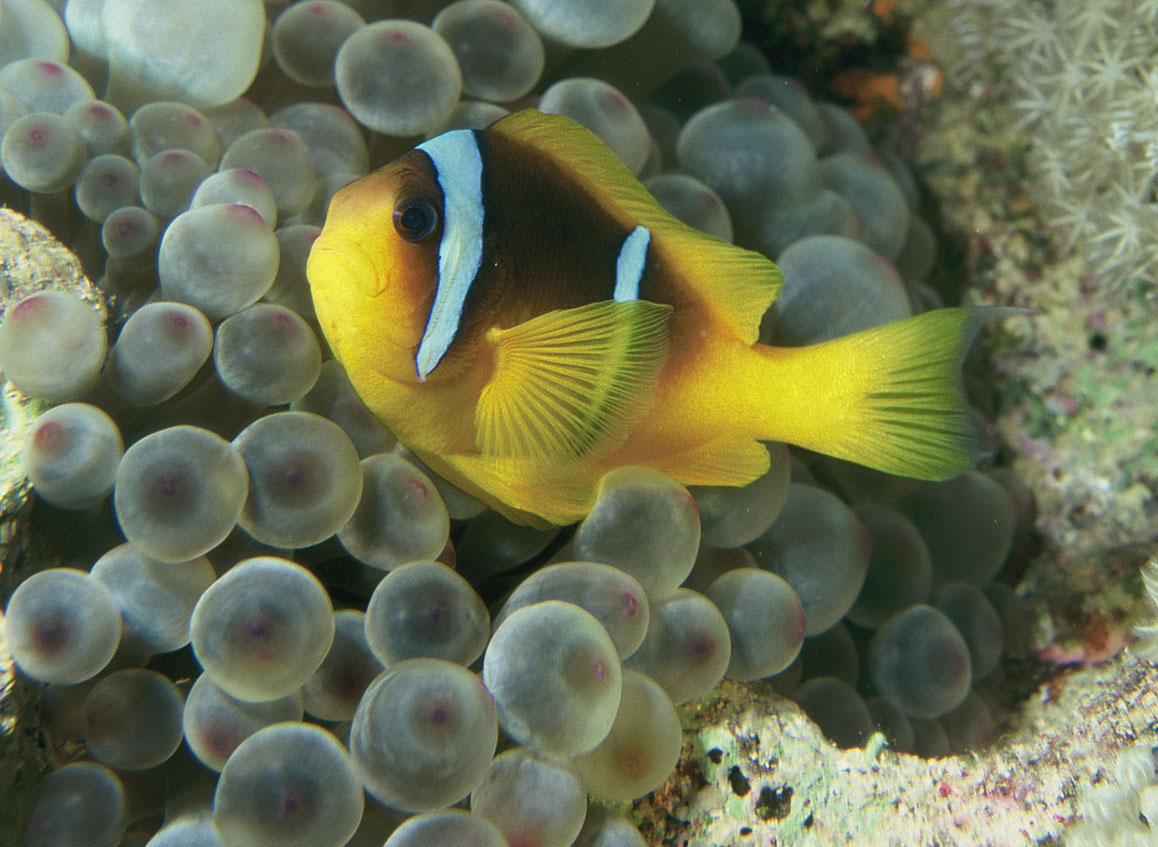
Amphiprion bicinctus in Gyrostoma

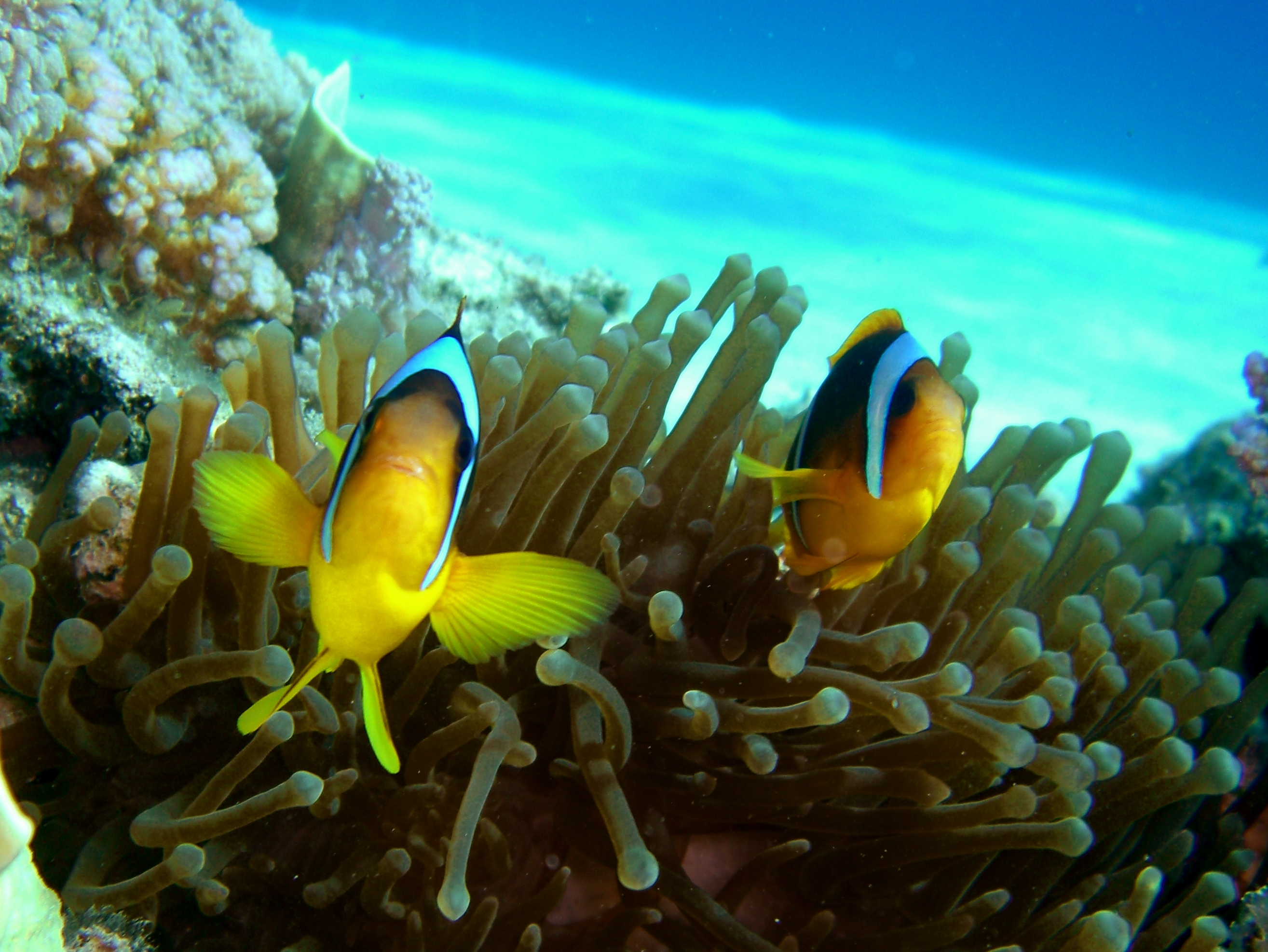
Pair of Red Sea Anemonefish
