= Corrugator =

Corrugator may refer to:

- Corrugator supercilii muscle, a small, narrow, pyramidal muscle close to the eye
- Corrugator cutis ani muscle, after the anatomist George Viner Ellis
- Machinery used to manufacture corrugated fiberboard used in boxes
- Machine which is used to produce corrugated stainless steel tubing

== See also ==
- Corrugated (disambiguation)
