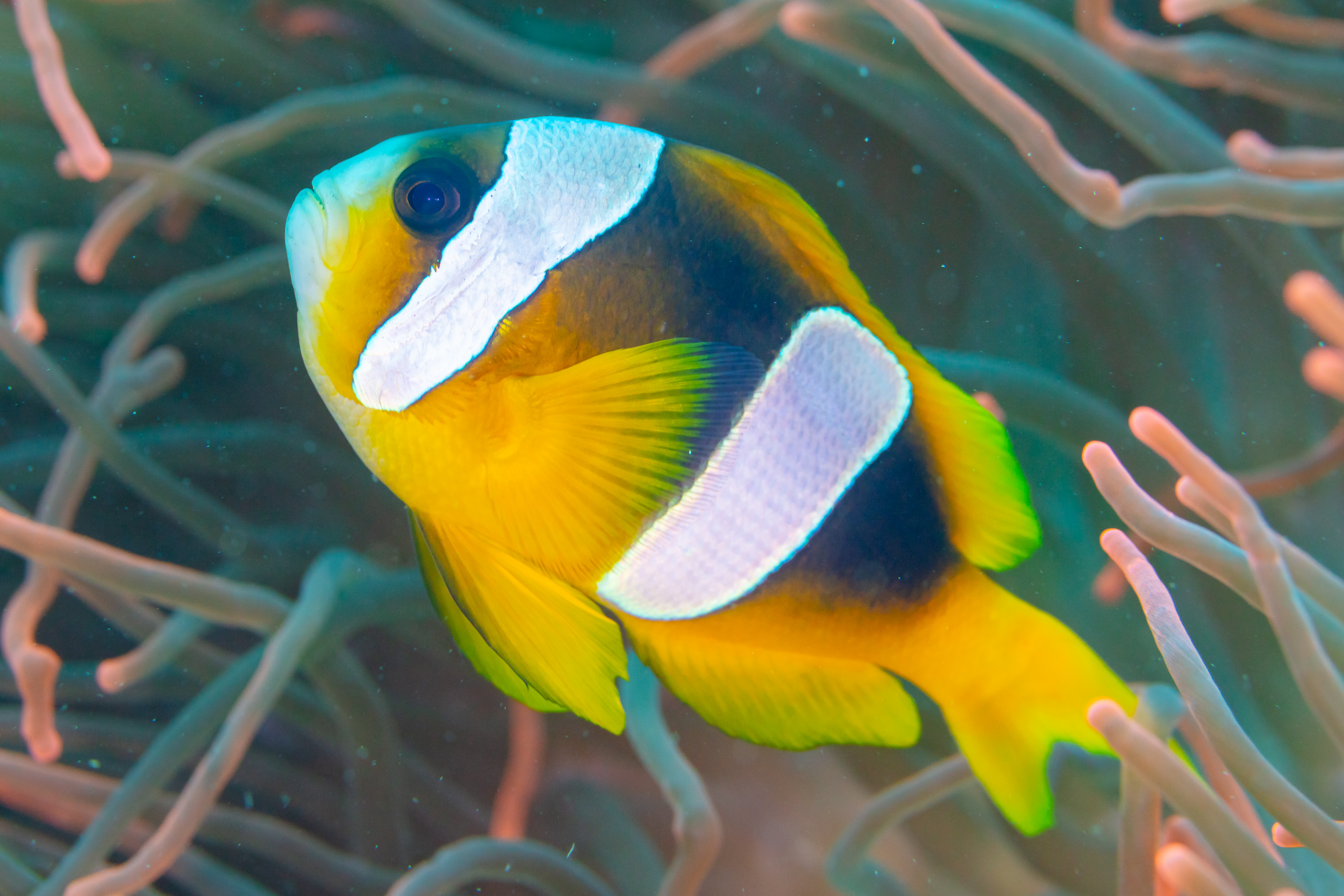

Conservation status
- Least Concern (IUCN 3.1)

Scientific classification
- Kingdom: Animalia
- Phylum: Chordata
- Class: Actinopterygii
- Order: Blenniiformes
- Family: Pomacentridae
- Genus: Amphiprion
- Species: A. latifasciatus

Binomial name
- Amphiprion latifasciatus (Allen 1972)

= Amphiprion latifasciatus =

Species of fish

Amphiprion latifasciatus, the Madagascar anemonefish, is a marine fish belonging to the family Pomacentridae, the clownfishes and damselfishes.

== Characteristics of anemonefish ==
Clownfish or anemonefish are fishes that, in the wild, form symbiotic mutualisms with sea anemones and are unaffected by the stinging tentacles of the host anemone, see Amphiprioninae § Mutualism. The sea anemone protects the clownfish from predators, as well as providing food through the scraps left from the anemone's meals and occasional dead anemone tentacles. In return, the clownfish defends the anemone from its predators, and parasites. Clownfish are small-sized, 10–18 centimetres (3.9–7.1 in), and depending on species, they are overall yellow, orange, or a reddish or blackish color, and many show white bars or patches. Within species there may be color variations, most commonly according to distribution, but also based on sex, age and host anemone. Clownfish are found in warmer waters of the Indian and Pacific oceans and the Red Sea in sheltered reefs or in shallow lagoons.

In a group of clownfish, there is a strict dominance hierarchy. The largest and most aggressive fish is female and is found at the top. Only two clownfish, a male and a female, in a group reproduce through external fertilization. Clownfish are sequential hermaphrodites, meaning that they develop into males first, and when they mature, they become females.

== Description ==
The body of A. latifasciatus is blackish, with yellow snout, belly and all fins and two white bars. The mid-body bar is generally wider than similar species. The caudal fin is slightly forked. They have 10-11 dorsal spines, 2 anal spines, 15-16 dorsal soft rays and 12-14 anal soft rays. They reach a maximum length of 13 cm (5 in).

=== Color variations ===
None known.

=== Similar species ===
A. omanensis has a forked caudal fin however its pelvic and anal fins are black and the mid bar is much narrower. The forked caudal fin distinguishes A. latifasciatus from A. allardi, A. bicinctus, A. chrysopterus and A. clarkii. The wide mid-body bar of A. latifasciatus also helps to distinguish it from these species. A. allardi, A. bicinctus and A. chrysopterus can also be distinguished by their white caudal fin. The wide color variation of A. clarkii makes it more difficult to distinguish by color alone, although the presence of a white caudal fin or white bar at the base of the caudal fin indicates the fish is not A. latifasciatus.

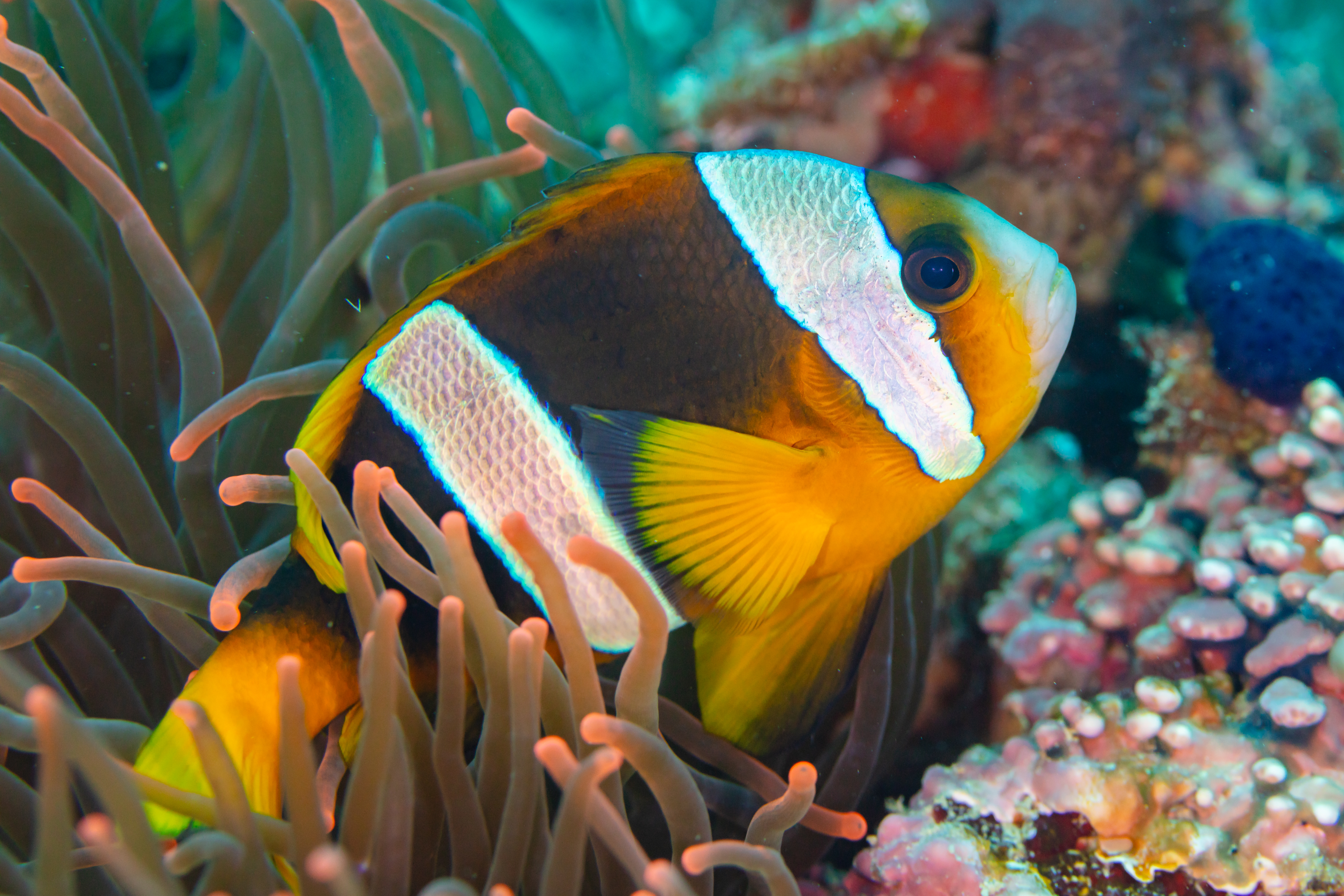
A. latifasciatus (Madagascar anemonefish)

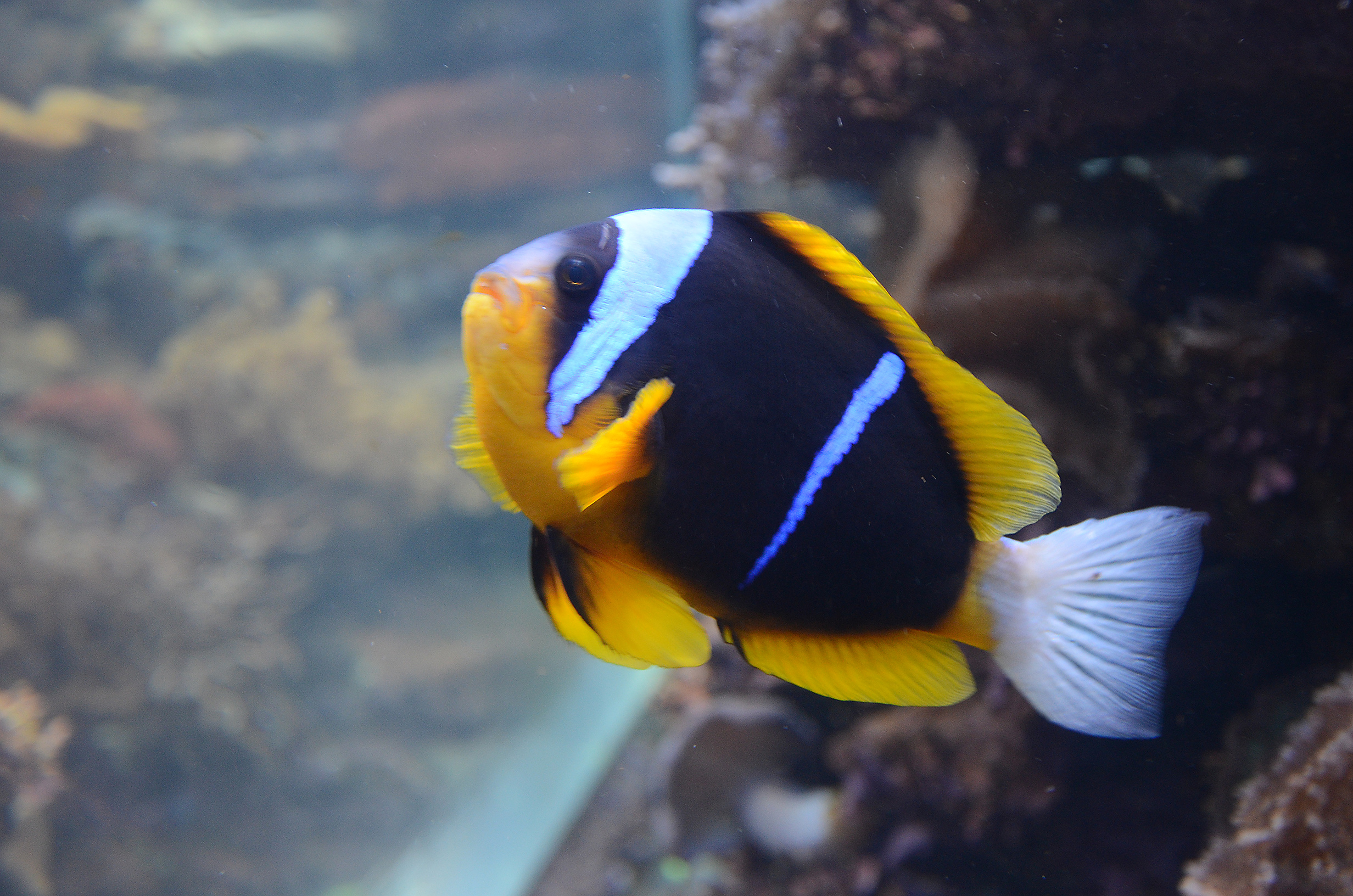
A. allardi (Allard's anemonefish).

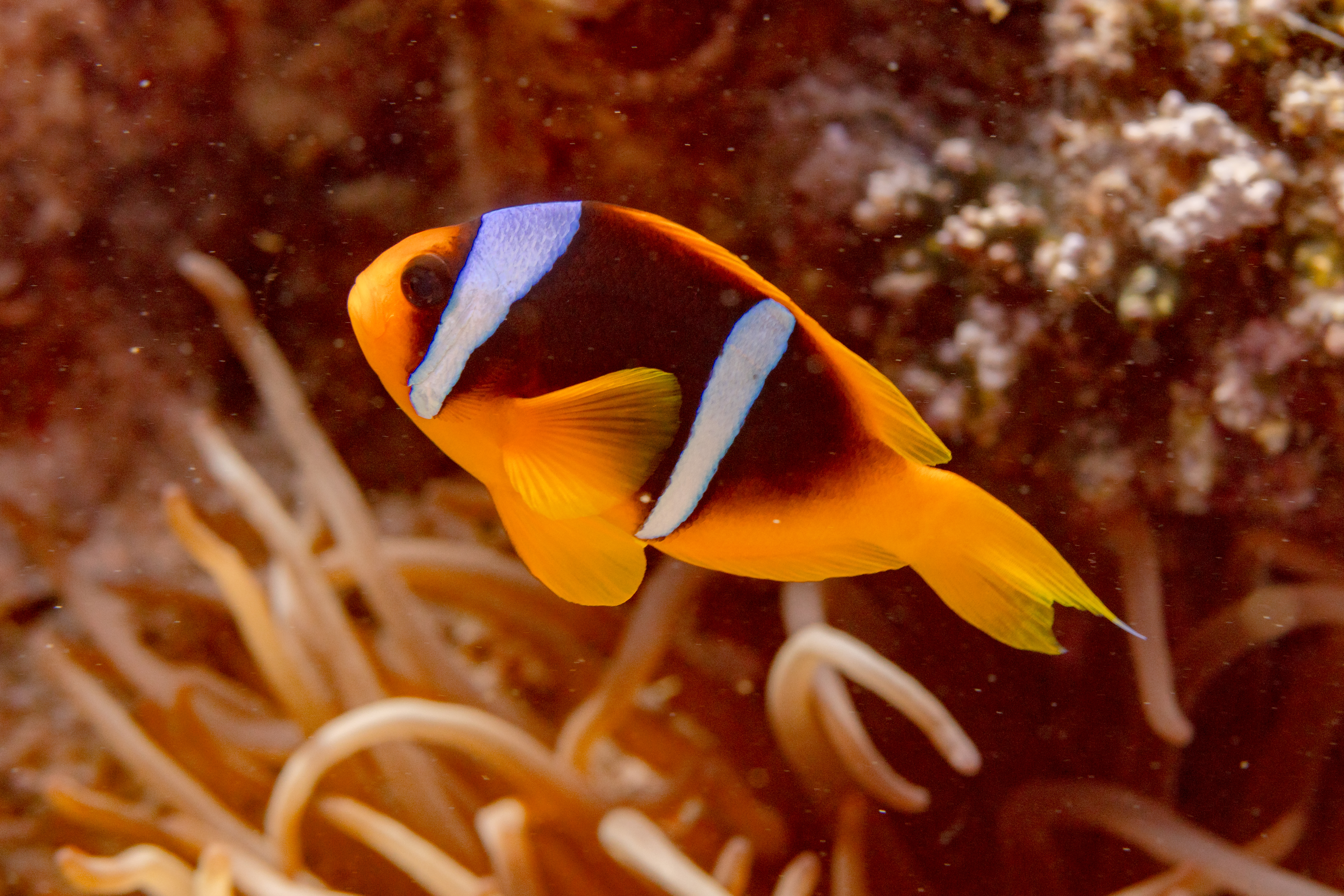
A. bicinctus (Two-band anemonefish)

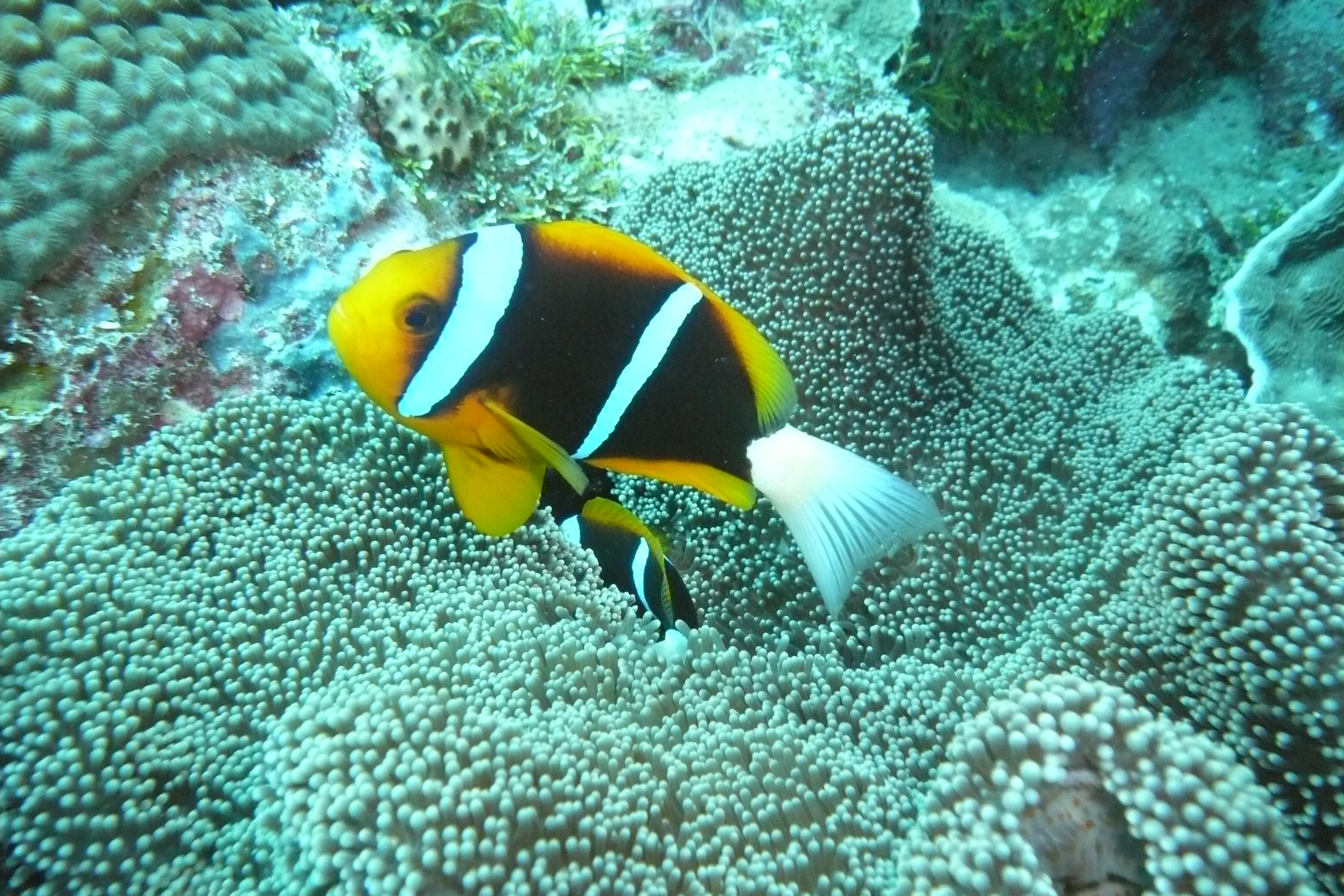
A. chrysopterus (Orange-fin anemonefish), Palau

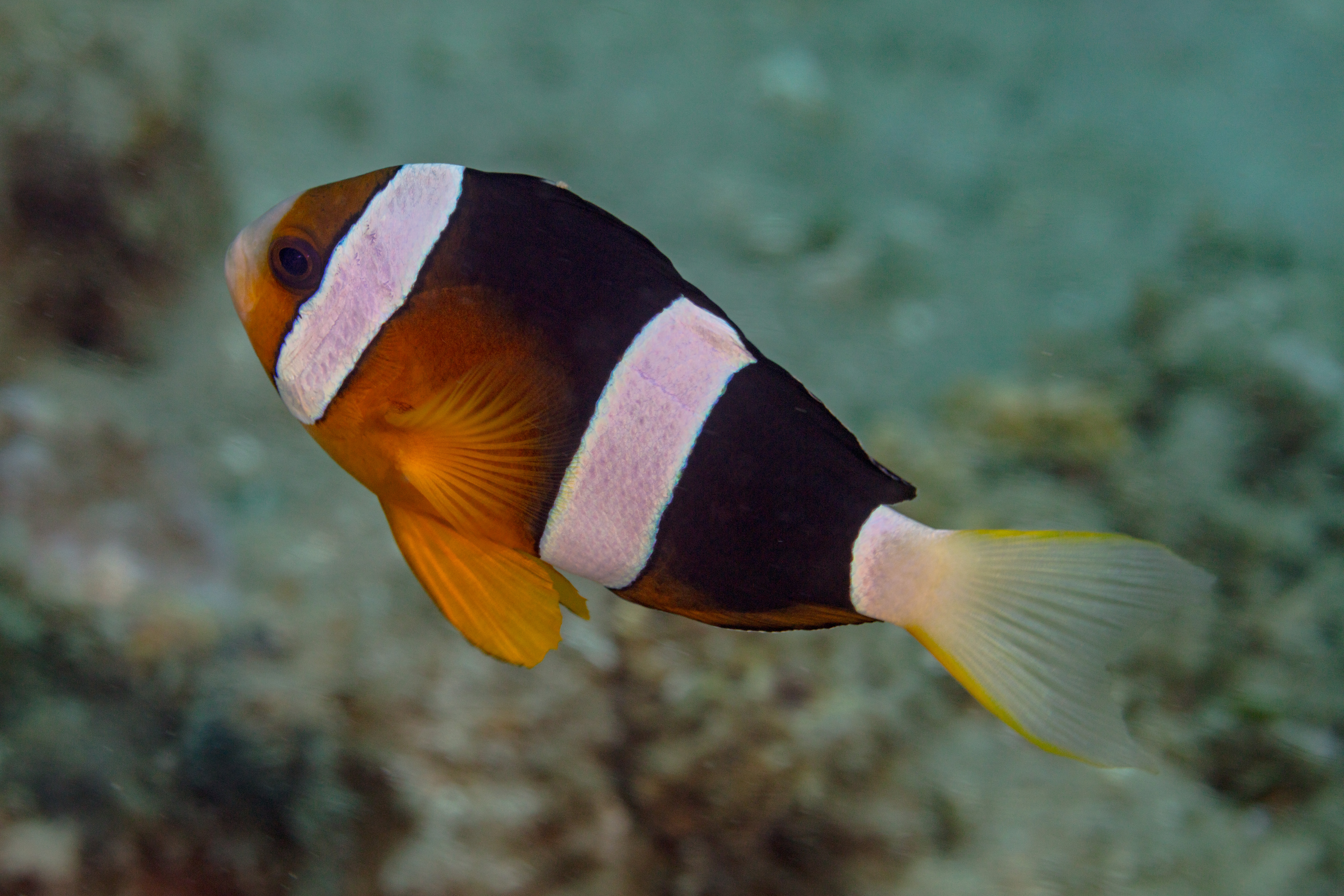
A. clarkii (Clark's anemonefish)

== Distribution and habitat ==
A. latifasciatus is found only in Madagascar and the Comoro Islands in the western Indian Ocean..

=== Host anemones ===
A. latifasciatus is associated with the following species of anemone:

- Stichodactyla mertensii Mertens' carpet sea anemone
- Entacmaea quadricolor Bubble-tip anemone

== Breeding in captivity ==
A. latifasciatus was first bred in captivity at the University of Illinois Urbana-Champaign by researcher Ross DeAngelis, within the Clownfish Research Laboratory.. In August 2014, one A. latifasciatus survived and was reared to the juvenile phase from a batch of A. latifasciatus spawn from July 14, 2014.. A. latifasciatus are extremely rare within the aquarium trade, mostly due to their habitat being limited to specific regions within the western Indian Ocean..
