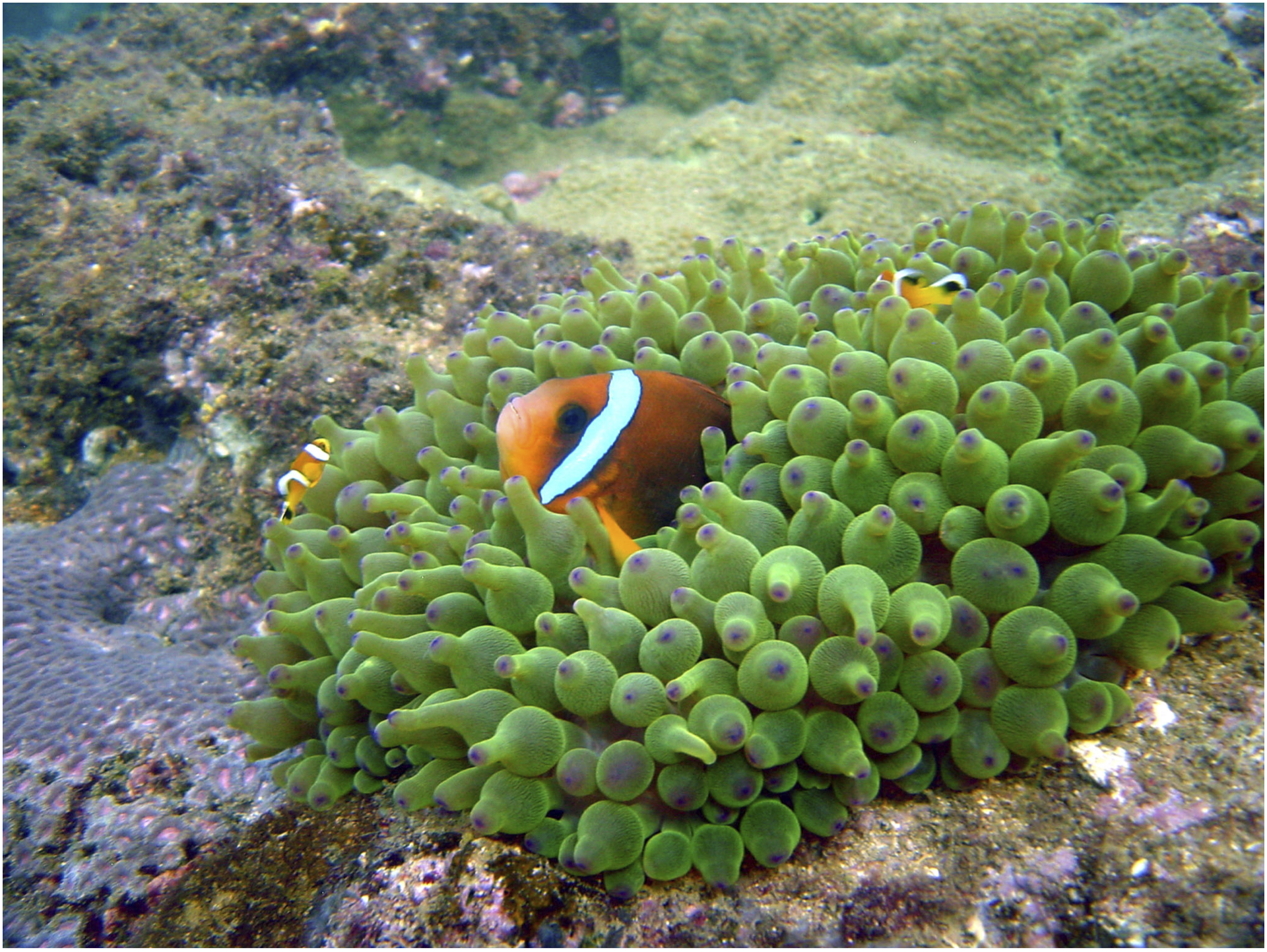

Conservation status
- Least Concern (IUCN 3.1)

Scientific classification
- Kingdom: Animalia
- Phylum: Chordata
- Class: Actinopterygii
- Order: Blenniiformes
- Family: Pomacentridae
- Genus: Amphiprion
- Species: A. omanensis

Binomial name
- Amphiprion omanensis Allen & Mee 1991

= Amphiprion omanensis =

Species of fish

Amphiprion omanensis, the Oman anemonefish, is a marine fish belonging to the family Pomacentridae, the clownfishes and damselfishes.

== Description ==
The body of A. omanensis is dark brown and with two white bars and distinctive forked caudal fin, which is blackish in juveniles fading to white in adults. The midbody bar is narrow and does not extend onto the dorsal fin while the headbar is also narrow and usually constricted across the nape They have 10 dorsal spines, 2 anal spines, 10-17 dorsal soft rays and 14-15 anal soft rays. They reach a maximum length of 14 cm (5 1/2 in).

=== Color variations ===
None known.

=== Similar species ===
The white forked caudal fin is distinctive, with only A. latifasciatus having a forked caudal fin, however A. omanensis has a narrow midbody bar, white caudal fin and black pelvic and anal fins while A. latifasciatus has a much wider midbody bar, and yellow fins.

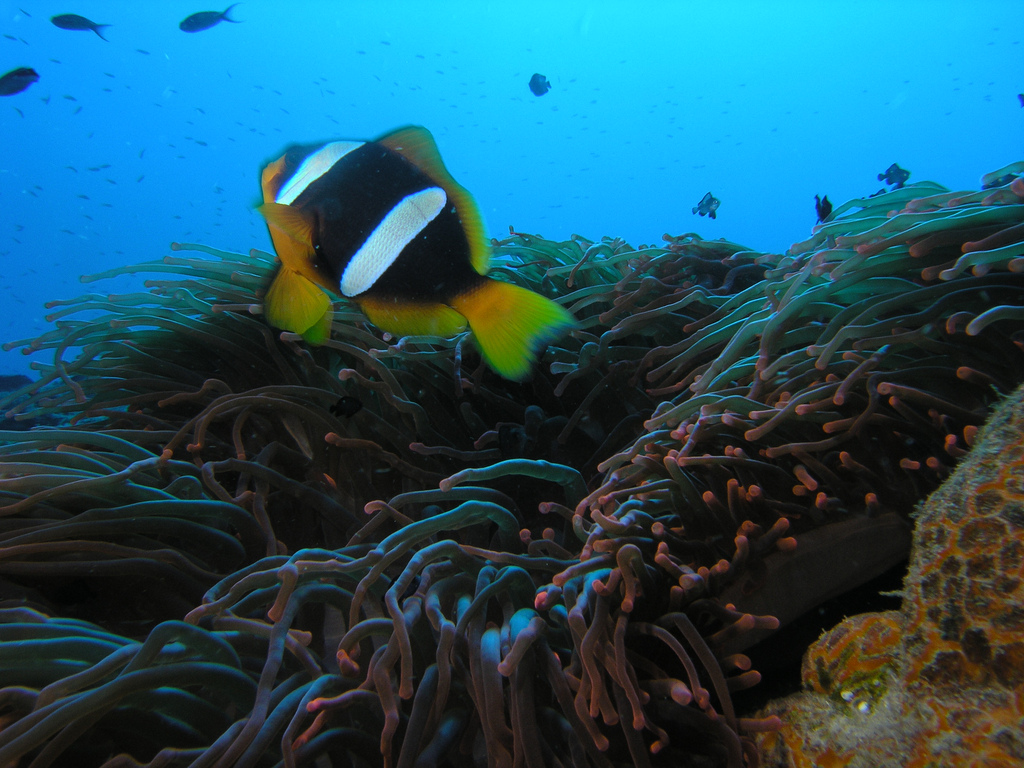
A. latifasciatus (Madagascar anemonefish)

== Distribution and habitat ==
A. omanensis is found in Oman in the Arabian Peninsula. Anemone fish are sedentary and depend on ocean currents for dispersal. As A. omanesis is confined within a small range, it was used to study long-distance dispersal, from sites 400 kilometres (250 mi) apart at either end of its range. Adults provide high levels of parental care to their young that hatch with well-developed swimming and sensory capabilities before embarking on a <3 week pelagic larval phase, during which time they may disperse over long distances. The study found an asymmetrical dispersal pattern between the two regions with a higher occurrence of southward dispersal, consistent with the prevailing currents, with immigration rates of 5.4% in the south and 0.7% in the north.

=== Host anemones ===
A. omanensis is associated with the following species of anemone:

- Entacmaea quadricolor Bubble-tip anemone
- Heteractis crispa Sebae anemone
