= Bhanotia pauciradiata =

Few-rayed pipefish

Conservation status
- Data Deficient (IUCN 3.1)

Scientific classification
- Kingdom: Animalia
- Phylum: Chordata
- Class: Actinopterygii
- Order: Syngnathiformes
- Family: Syngnathidae
- Genus: Bhanotia
- Species: B. pauciradiata

Binomial name
- Bhanotia pauciradiata Allen & Kuiter, 1995

Species of fish

Bhanotia pauciradiata (few-rayed pipefish) is a little known marine fish of the family Syngnathidae. This species is only known from a single specimen, which was found on a reef slope near Indonesia, at a depth of around 10–12 m (33–39 ft). The specimen was 3.2 centimetres (1.3 in) long. This species is ovoviviparous, with the male carrying eggs in its brood pouch until giving birth to live young.
