= Bhanotia nuda =

Naked pipefish

Conservation status
- Least Concern (IUCN 3.1)=

Scientific classification
- Kingdom: Animalia
- Phylum: Chordata
- Class: Actinopterygii
- Order: Syngnathiformes
- Family: Syngnathidae
- Genus: Bhanotia
- Species: B. nuda

Binomial name
- Bhanotia nuda Dawson, 1978

Species of fish

Bhanotia nuda (naked pipefish) is a marine fish of the family Syngnathidae. It is found in the western central Pacific, near Palau and southeastern Papua New Guinea. It inhabits shallow (0–2 metres (0.0–6.6 ft)) reef habitats, mangrove forests, coral reefs, and silty waters (metamorphosed individuals found in deeper tide pools – up to 14 metres (46 ft)), where it can grow to lengths of 7 centimetres (2.8 in). This species is ovoviviparous, with the males carrying eggs in brood pouches until they are ready to hatch.
