= Bhanotia =

Scientific classification
- Kingdom: Animalia
- Phylum: Chordata
- Class: Actinopterygii
- Order: Syngnathiformes
- Family: Syngnathidae
- Subfamily: Syngnathinae
- Genus: Bhanotia; Hora, 1926

Type species
- Syngnathus corrugatus Weber, 1913

Genus of fishes

Bhanotia is a genus of pipefishes native to the Indian and Pacific Oceans.

== Species ==
There are currently three recognized species in this genus:

- Bhanotia fasciolata (A. H. A. Duméril, 1870)
- Bhanotia nuda C. E. Dawson, 1978 (Naked pipefish)
- Bhanotia pauciradiata G. R. Allen & Kuiter, 1995 (Few-rayed pipefish)
