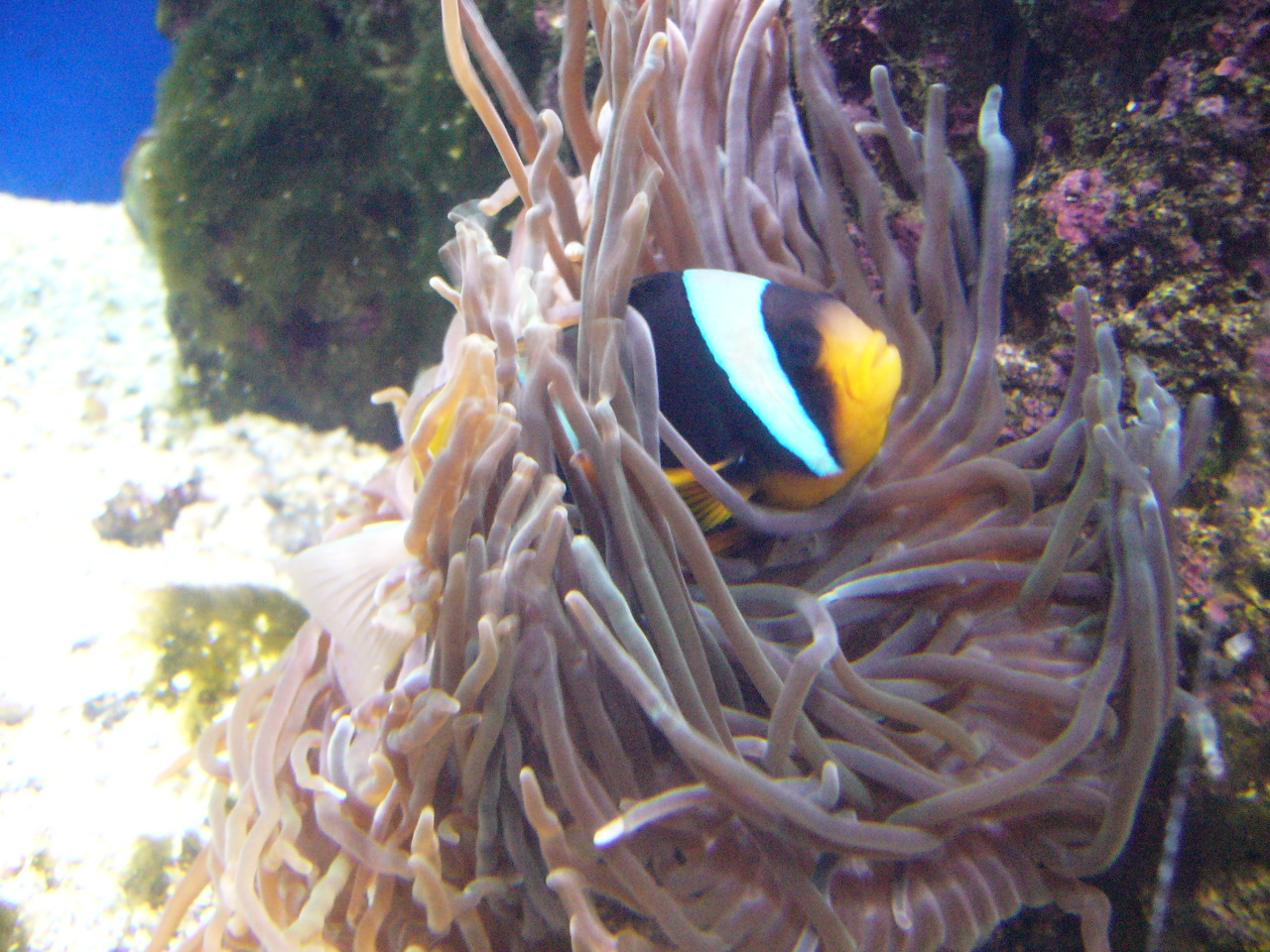
- Amphiprion allardi in Aquarium Finisterrae

Conservation status
- Least Concern (IUCN 3.1)

Scientific classification
- Kingdom: Animalia
- Phylum: Chordata
- Class: Actinopterygii
- Order: Blenniiformes
- Family: Pomacentridae
- Genus: Amphiprion
- Species: A. allardi

Binomial name
- Amphiprion allardi Klausewitz, 1970

= Allard's clownfish =

Species of fish

Allard's clownfish or Allard's anemonefish (Amphiprion allardi) is a marine fish belonging to the family Pomacentridae, the clownfishes and damselfishes, from the western Indian Ocean off the coast of East Africa and the Mascarenes.

== Characteristics of anemonefish ==
Clownfish or anemonefish are fishes that, in the wild, form symbiotic mutualisms with sea anemones and are unaffected by the stinging tentacles of the host anemone, see Amphiprioninae § Mutualism. The sea anemone protects the clownfish from predators, as well as providing food through the scraps left from the anemone's meals and occasional dead anemone tentacles. In return, the clownfish defends the anemone from its predators and parasites. Clownfish are small-sized, 10–18 cm (3.9–7.1 in), and depending on species, they are overall yellow, orange, or a reddish or blackish color, and many show white bars or patches. Color variations occur between species, most commonly according to distribution, but also based on sex, age, and host anemone. Clownfish are found in warmer waters of the Indian and Pacific Oceans and the Red Sea in sheltered reefs or in shallow lagoons.

In a group of clownfish, a strict dominance hierarchy exists. The largest and most aggressive fish is female and is found at the top. Only two clownfish, a male and a female, in a group reproduce through external fertilization. Clownfish are sequential hermaphrodites, meaning they develop into males first, and when they mature, become females.

== Description ==
Adults are a dark-brown to black color with two white bars with black edging encircling the body. The caudal fin is white with other fins orange. They have 10-11 dorsal spines, two anal spines, 15-17 dorsal soft rays, and 15-17 anal soft rays. They reach a maximum length of 14 cm (5 1/2 in).

=== Similar species ===
Allard's anemonefish is almost identical to A. chrysopterus (orange-fin anemonefish) and are distinguished by their geographic location. Allard's anemonefish is similar to the nearby A. latifasciatus (Madagascar anemonefish), but A. latifasciatus has a forked, yellow caudal fin.

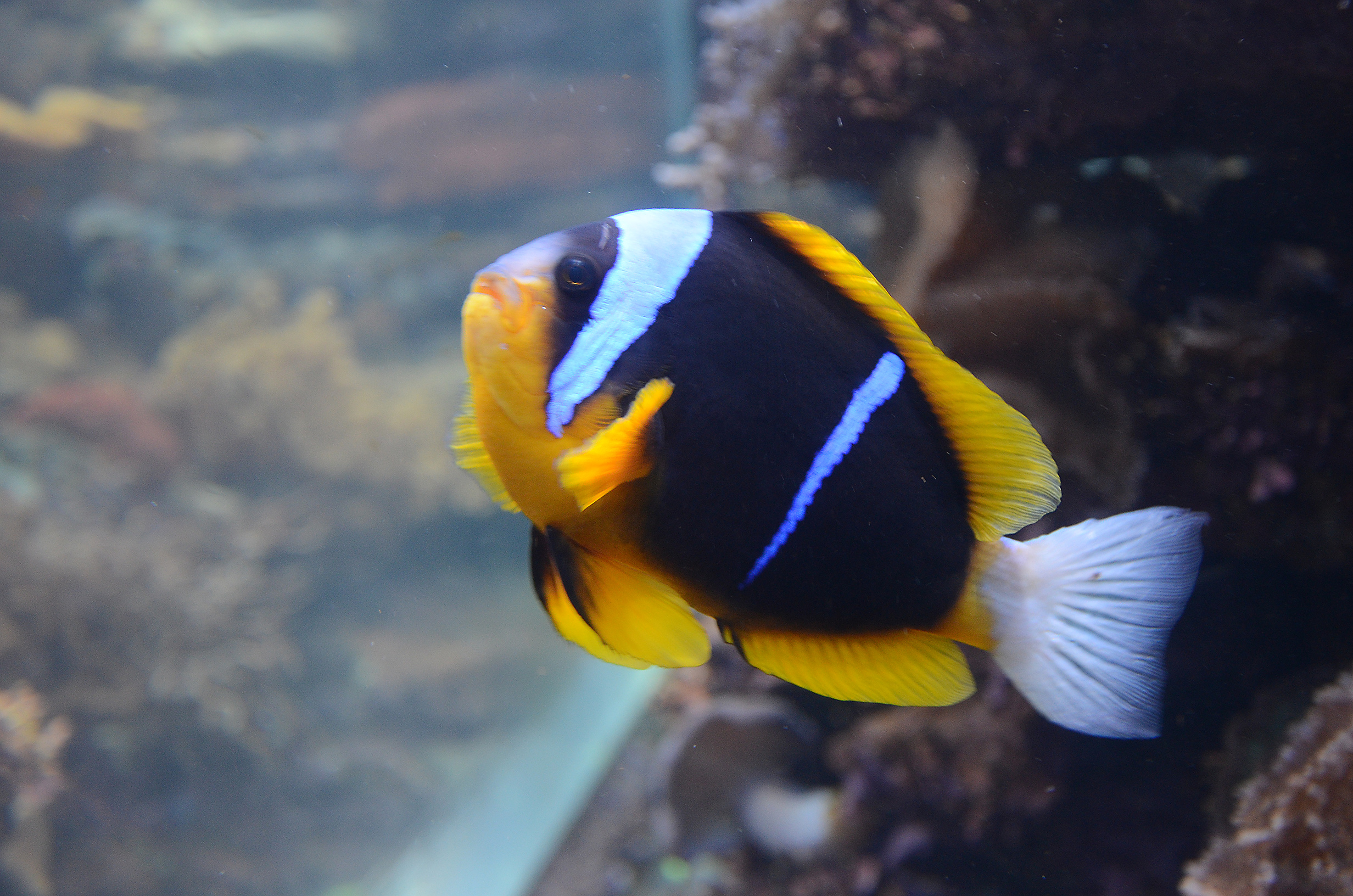
A. allardi (Allard's anemonefish)

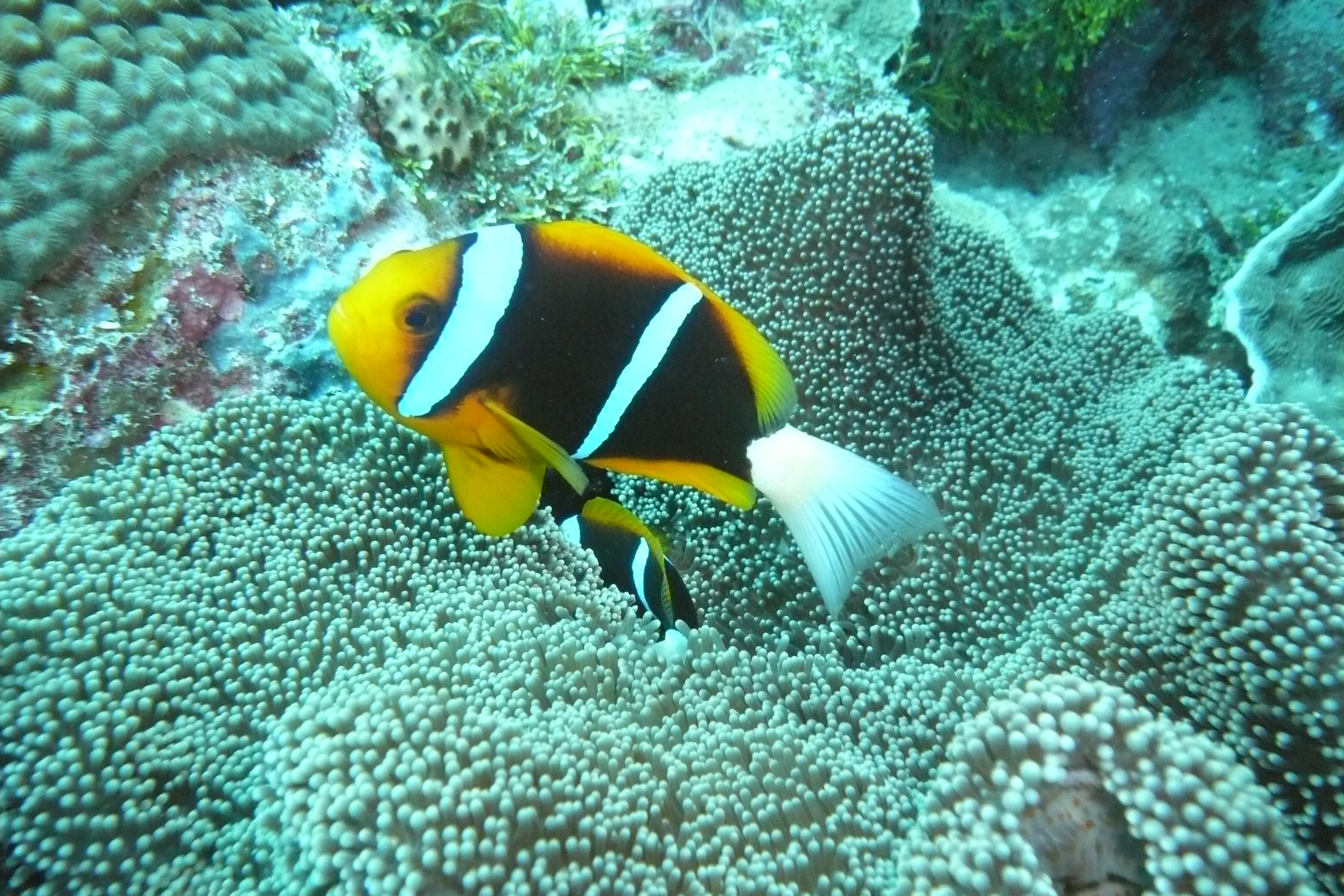
A. chrysopterus (orange-fin anemonefish), Palau

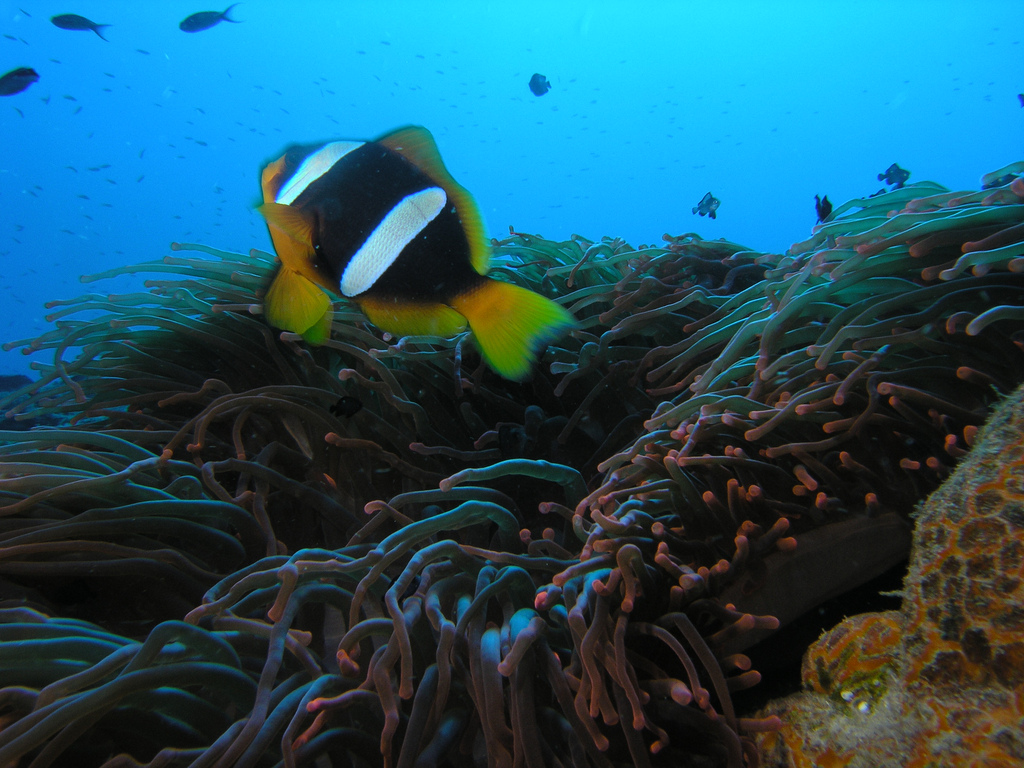
A. latifasciatus (Madagascar anemonefish) showing the distinctive forked tail

== Distribution and habitat ==
Allard's anemonefish is found in east Africa between Kenya and Durban. and east to the Seychelles and Mascarene Islands. They are usually found near to or within the tentacles of their host anemones.

=== Host anemones ===
Allard's anemonefish is associated with these species of anemones:

- Entacmaea quadricolor bubble-tip anemone
- Heteractis aurora beaded sea anemone
- Stichodactyla mertensii Mertens' carpet sea anemone

== Etymology ==
The specific name and the common name honour the aquarist and marine collector Jacques Allard who gave support to the author, Wolfgang Klausewitz's visit to East Africa and who supplied him with many specimens.
