= Corrugated darter =

Conservation status
- Least Concern (IUCN 3.1)

Scientific classification
- Kingdom: Animalia
- Phylum: Chordata
- Class: Actinopterygii
- Order: Perciformes
- Family: Percidae
- Genus: Etheostoma
- Species: E. basilare

Binomial name
- Etheostoma basilare Page, Hardman & Near, 2003

Species of fish

The corrugated darter (Etheostoma basilare) is a species of freshwater ray-finned fish, a darter from the subfamily Etheostomatinae, part of the family Percidae, which also contains the perches, ruffes and pikeperches. It is endemic to the eastern United States only known from Caney Fork, Tennessee, where it has been shown to have as many as five subgroups. They are active hunters which prey on insects, fry, and possibly young snails. Multiple species and subspecies of these darters can coexist where substrate is varied, so this must be carefully preserved to accommodate many similar species. With the warming of spring, E. basilare enters its breeding cycle and males develop their dimorphic coloration. Like most darters, it hugs the stream bed, using its body shape and fin posture to maintain its position.

This lifestyle which is so dependent upon the benthic architecture of the stream is highly impacted by disturbance, which can be the result of increased or decreased flow from dams, introduction of polluted debris, or particulate size change due to erosion. Dams, in particular, pose a large threat to this species due to the effects of siltation, which can over time fill in streambed substrate gaps, destroying nesting sites and suffocating any eggs already laid. In addition, different species and subspecies of darter are highly adapted to a given substrate size, which insinuates that this habitat homogenization could result in a negative impact on the existent E. basilare subspecies diversity and on the darter ecological balance as a whole.

== Distribution ==
The corrugated darter is endemic to the upper section of the Caney Fork and Collins River in eastern Tennessee, both of which are part of the Cumberland River drainage. It has been consistently present in this area since its original speciation, upon which its geographic home has had considerable influence. Formed by the abundance of melt from the receding North American glaciers, which presumably carried the darter ancestor with it, this part of the river system has been mostly isolated from neighboring water systems by this drastic geographic change, creating a likely environment for the genetic deviation of many darter species, E. basilare included. This effect can also be observed at a smaller scale. Conditions in this part of the river have enabled the corrugated darter to further diverge into five closely related subgroups, highlighting the adaptability of the species and how even small habitat differences can drive divergence.

== Ecology ==
No study has yet been made of the corrugated darter's feeding habits, but many of its relatives are active predators, hunting insects and fry while situationally consuming detritus. The closely related E. barbouri, or teardrop darter, is known to eat fly and mayfly larva, augmenting this diet with decaying leaves and other decomposing biomatter in the water. It is likely preyed upon by local bass, trout, sculpin, reptiles, and salamanders as adults, as well as by carnivorous aquatic insects as fry. This species competes most strongly on an interspecific level, as can be seen in the resulting five subspecies. In similar species, the greatest factor in the balance of these cohabitating darters is the size of the substrate in the river bed. Being a benthic species, this creates a number of microhabitats which allow these subspecies to coexist with its own preferred territory. Darters inhabit most water depths up to a meter as adults, depending on substrate size, but greatly prefer the protection of shallow riffles as fry. As adults, they also enter these areas to breed.

== Life history ==
In related darters, sexual maturity is often reached at a year old. The breeding season is estimated to be from April to May annually, but depends greatly on water temperature, which causes the sexual reaction to take place. Males and females of many darter species do exhibit obvious sexual dimorphism, with bright mating displays present in the males, but no such information indicates the presence or lack of these colors for E. basilare. Most darters have shown a preference for moderately shallow riffles during the breeding season, where the running water may aid oxygen dispersion to the eggs and provide a safer nursery for the fry. They nest under flat rocks, where the males aggressively guard their clutch of eggs laid by multiple females, whose average egg deposition varies widely between species; this figure for E. basilare is not known. The corrugated darter may participate in egg-mimicking behavior, using the spots on their pectoral fins to entice prospective mates, which prefer experienced males already guarding eggs, into depositing in their nest. They have been recorded as reaching 5.5 cm in length; the average lifespan of this species is not documented.

== Management ==
The corrugated darter is rated as "Least Concern" by the IUCN Red List of Threatened Species. As of yet, this species has seen little habitat disruption, having no major damming or construction projects in the area. The nearest dam, Dale Hollow, is located further down the Caney Fork's flow. The greatest risk this structure presents to the species is found in the lake behind it, which has been stocked with potential predators - walleye and several species of crappie and bass. The threat of extinction due to this is minimal, however, as the previously mentioned fish are all popular sport fish, subject to frequent reduction by human predation. In addition, this fish exhibits high fecundity, doubling its population in as few as 15 months, making it particularly resistant to predation, though possibly more vulnerable when breeding sites are disturbed and it is unable to adequately recoup its population loss. In many species of darter, hybridization is a major concern, since they are closely related and use external fertilization. In E. basilare, however, this is probably not the case. The existence of their many subspecies may indicate the detrimental effects of hybridization are minimal, either due to some form of sperm exclusion or perhaps resulting from the localization of the subspecies in relation to their optimal habitats.
