= Bhanotia fasciolata =

Conservation status
- Least Concern (IUCN 3.1)

Scientific classification
- Kingdom: Animalia
- Phylum: Chordata
- Class: Actinopterygii
- Order: Syngnathiformes
- Family: Syngnathidae
- Genus: Bhanotia
- Species: B. fasciolata

Binomial name
- Bhanotia fasciolata Duméril, 1870

Synonyms
- Syngnathus fasciolatus Duméril, 1870; Corythoichthys fasciculatus Kaup, 1853; Syngnathus uncinatus Weber, 1913; Syngnathus corrugatus Weber, 1913; Bhanotia corrugatus (Weber, 1913); Corythoichthys corrugatus Weber, 1913; Bhanotia sewelli Hora, 1926

Species of fish

Bhanotia fasciolata (corrugated pipefish, or barbed pipefish) is a marine fish of the family Syngnathidae. It is found in coral reefs, tidepools, and muddy/silty substrates in the Eastern Indian Ocean and Western Pacific. It inhabits at a depth range of 3–25 metres (9.8–82.0 ft), where it can grow up to 9 centimetres (3.5 in). It is ovoviviparous, with the male carrying the eggs in a brood pouch until they are ready to hatch.
