= Corrugated stainless steel tubing =

Corrugated stainless steel tubing (CSST) is tubing made of stainless steel with corrugation on the inside or outside.

CSST is not FAC (Flexible Appliance Connector) tubing. Currently, CSST and FAC tubing both use corrugated stainless steel tubing. In the past, FAC used corrugated brass tubing. However, FAC tubing is made only in lengths of 1 to 6 feet, FAC tubing is made with connectors on each end, and FAC tubing does not have a plastic sheath. On FAC tubing the corrugations are visible. CSST's plastic sheath covers its corrugations.

== Variants ==
The most common CSST is a type of conduit used for fuel gas distribution in buildings. It has a flexible corrugated stainless steel inner layer and an outer yellow or black plastic jacket. Yellow-jacketed CSST was developed first and is the most common. It has a non-conductive plastic yellow jacket. Black-jacketed CSST is relatively new. Its black jacket is electrically conductive. Manufacturer information indicates this conductive jacket dissipates the energy of indirect lightning strikes that might otherwise pierce or damage the yellow-jacketed CSST.

A less common type of CSST does not have a plastic jacket. It is mainly used in heat exchangers.

== Usage ==
CSST is used as an alternative to the older standard “black iron” (steel) gas pipe. The inner stainless steel layer of typical residential CSST is .2 to .3 mm thick while the wall thickness of typical residential “black iron” gas pipe is 3 to 4 mm thick. CSST is more expensive than “black iron” gas pipe. However, CSST requires fewer joints, may be safer during earthquakes, and may be easier to install.

== Properties ==
CSST is alleged to have an increased risk for lightning related fires. Some believe that CSST is more likely to be pierced by lightning than “black iron” pipe. There are varied opinions over CSST's fire risk and it has been involved in litigation.

== Installation ==
Buildings with CSST should be inspected by experts (licensed plumbers and electricians) to verify proper bonding and installation. The CSST experts should be qualified to assure compliance with the requirements of the manufacturer and local codes. Be aware that most home inspections are not done by licensed plumbers and electricians. Building owners are advised to assure that their CSST system complies with their insurance company's requirements.

To reduce the possibility of CSST lightning damage: (1) Yellow-jacketed CSST should be bonded (connected to the electrical service panel's ground bus) at its entrance into a building. Many local codes require this. (2) All CSST should be installed away from metal objects such as metal duct work, metal pipes, electrical wiring, metal beams, or metal conduit.

CSST should not make contact with sharp objects or edges to reduce the possibility of leaks caused by piercing. For example, it should not be installed where things such as cabinet screws, picture hanger nails, or drywall screws might pierce it.
