= Marine fish =

Fish that live all or much of their lives in seawater

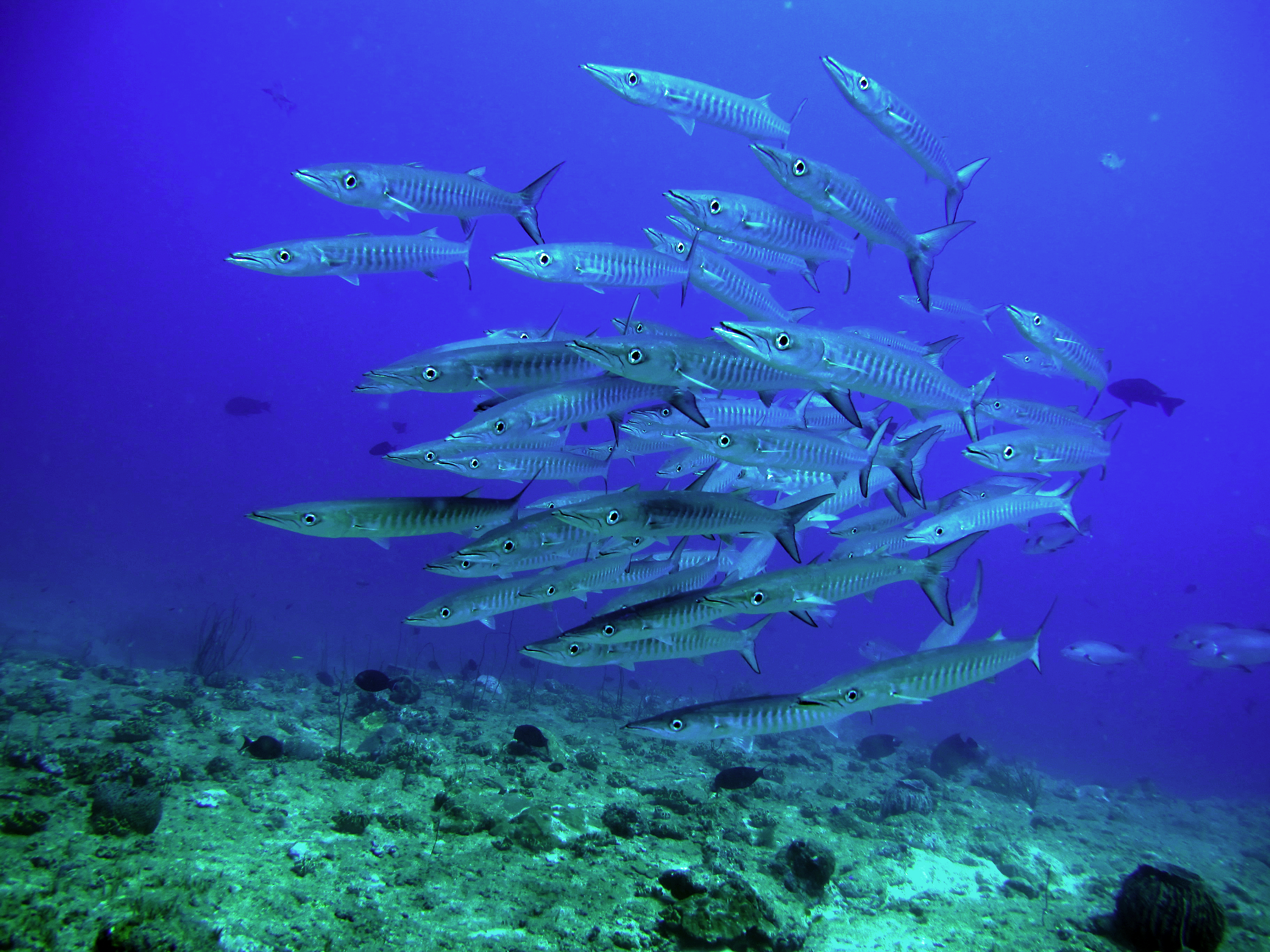
Barracuda in the sea around the Andaman Islands

Marine fish, also termed saltwater fish or sea fish, are fish that live in seawater. Saltwater fish can live solitarily or in a large group called a school.

Saltwater fish are very commonly kept and raised in aquariums for research and as a hobby. Many marine fish are also fished for consumption, or farmed in aquaculture. However, many saltwater fish species have been overfished and are otherwise threatened by marine pollution or ecological changes.

== Diet ==
Fishes that live in the ocean can be carnivores, herbivores, or omnivores. Herbivores in the ocean eat things such as algae and flowering seagrasses. Many herbivores' diets consist of primarily algae. Most saltwater fish will eat both macroalgae and microalgae. Many fish eat red, green, brown, and blue algae, but some fish prefer other types. Most saltwater fish that are carnivores will never eat algae under any circumstances. Carnivores' diets consist of shrimp, plankton, or tiny crustaceans.

== Captivity ==
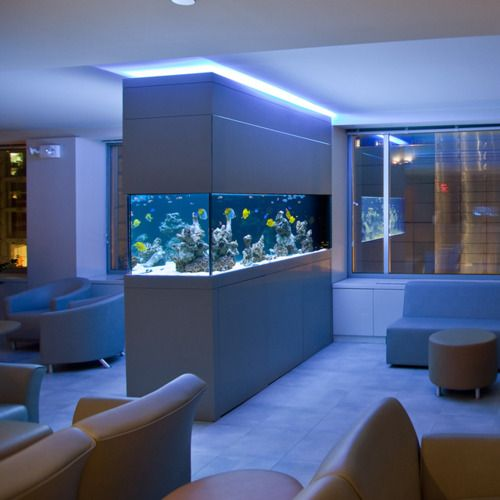
Saltwater fish tanks are popular among businesses and households.

Saltwater aquariums are a multi-million dollar industry in the United States. About 10 million marine fish are imported into the United States each year for aquarium use. The United States imports more saltwater fish than any other country in the world. There are approximately 2,000 different species of saltwater fish that are imported and used in captivity. In many circumstances, fish used for marine trade are collected using harmful tactics such as cyanide. One way that people are trying to protect the coral reefs is by breeding marine fish in captivity. Captive-bred fish are known to be healthier and likely to live longer. Captive-bred fish are less susceptible to disease because they have not been exposed to the wild and they have not been damaged during the shipment process. Fish that are bred in captivity are already accustomed to aquarium habitats and food.

== Habitats ==
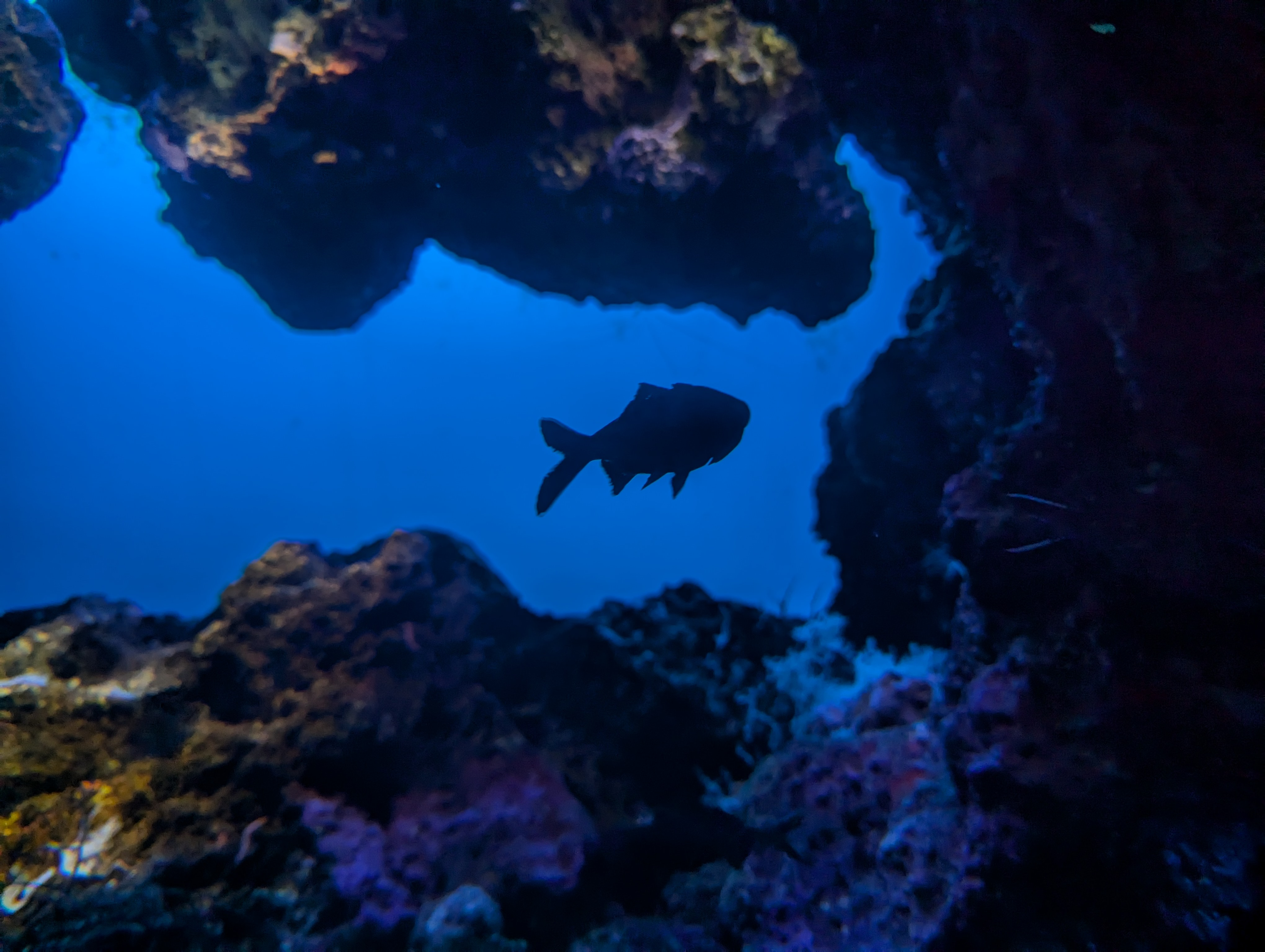
The dwelling place of a fish

There are many different components that make up a marine life habitat. Some of them are the temperature of the water, the quality, and quantity of water (flow and depth). Other components that can also contribute to the habitat of saltwater fish are pH level, salt level, and alkalinity level. Levels of nitrates and phosphates are also relevant, particularly when considering conditions for fish in captivity. There are other physical features that contribute to a habitat which are physical materials like rocks, reefs, and sand or the vegetation like the amount of algae, water plants, and saltmarsh. Specific fish live in specific habitats based on what they eat or what cycle of life they are currently at, another thing is the amount of salt that is in the water at that specific location. Some ocean habitats are not technically in the ocean and these are called estuaries, areas when oceans and rivers meet creating a mixture of salt water and freshwater making a different habitat for different types of fish and creatures to live in. The ocean is home to organisms as large as whales and as small as microscopic marine organisms such as phytoplankton. However, the vast majority of ocean life that humans are exposed to is simple saltwater fish. Saltwater fish can live in the deepest depths of the ocean where no sunlight can penetrate, but they can also live on the surface of the water.

== Threats ==
Marine fish face many anthropogenic threats. Common human-induced threats include overfishing, pollution, habitat loss and destruction, climate change and invasive species. The aforementioned threats all come with a multitude of negative direct and indirect affects to marine ecosystems. With the human population growing at an exponential rate, these threats are likely to continue to be prevalent in marine ecosystems.

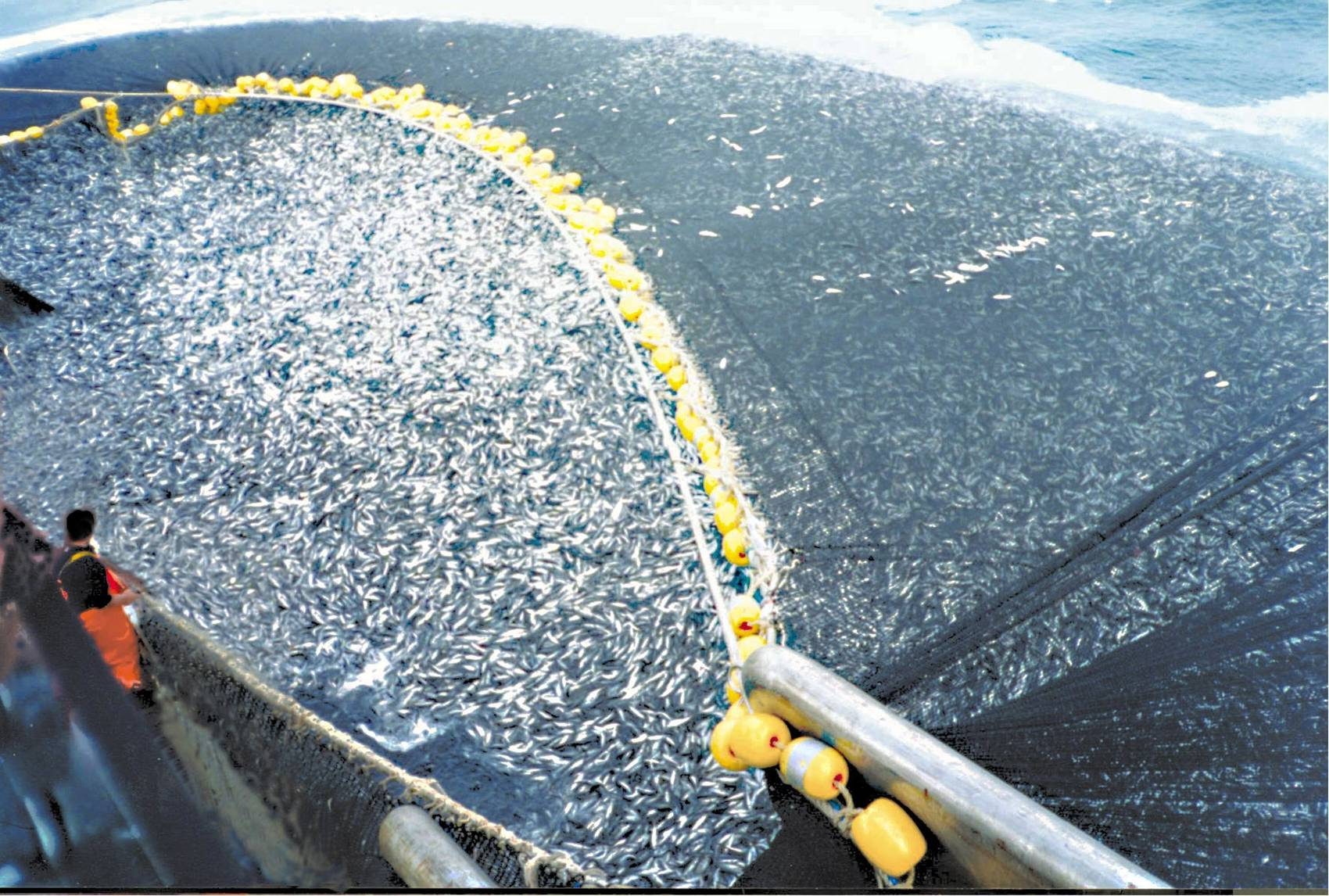
Commercial fishing boats bring in massive amounts of fish on a regular basis. Pictured above is a fisherman trawl harvesting cod.

=== Overfishing ===
Overfishing is defined as the mass removal of fish from a body of water that results in halting the ability for breeding populations to replenish what has been removed. Fish is one of the most popular foods in the world and consumption has continued to rise with the growing human population and will continue to do so. The value of the global seafood market has seen a 15% increase from 2016 to 2020 and is projected to increase even more by 2023. Although it provides many people with a source of food, the global seafood market is a major threat to the biodiversity of fishes. Bycatch is a direct effect of overfishing and is defined as the unwanted capture of different marine organisms during industrial fishing. This results in many different species of fish dying after they are captured and discarded. Data on bycatch is often unclear and not well recorded but it is estimated that the U.S. alone discards 17–22% of their catch annually. The Mesopredator release hypothesis is one of the indirect effects of overfishing that is also often referred to as "fishing down the food web". This phenomenon means as fisheries deplete large apex predatory species, mid-sized predatory species increase in abundance and assume the role as top predators on the food web. This impacts the food web in marine environments and disrupts the balance of the ecosystem and is likely to cause trophic cascades.

==== Species affected by overfishing ====
Profitable fish stocks like the bluefin tuna are decreasing in numbers because of high demand. According to the IUCN Red List, the Pacific bluefin tuna, Atlantic bluefin tuna, and southern bluefin tuna are classified as vulnerable, endangered and critically endangered all due to over-exploitation.

According to the IUCN Red List, the oceanic whitetip shark is considered critically endangered because of its value in the seafood market. Their rapidly declining population is due to people overfishing them for their fins. They are a popular species of shark used in shark fin soup because of the size of their fins. All sharks are used for shark fin soup, however, certain species of sharks are preferred over others because of the large size of their fins.

The great white shark is listed as vulnerable on the IUCN Red List because its fins are commonly used in shark fin soup and has led to people over harvesting them for their fins. This shark belongs to the class Chondrichthyes that includes all sharks, skates and rays. The great white shark is one of the many examples of shark species threatened by human consumption because of the shark fin soup, large population declines of this class has been noted since the early 2000s due to the high demand for their fins, gill rakers and liver oil.

The Atlantic cod was historically abundant in the waters off the coast of New England. Due to its low fat content and dense white flesh, this fish is a popular choice among humans. Now considered vulnerable, its populations have both decreased in abundance and their distribution has shifted from northern to southern areas due to overfishing.

=== Cage aquaculture ===
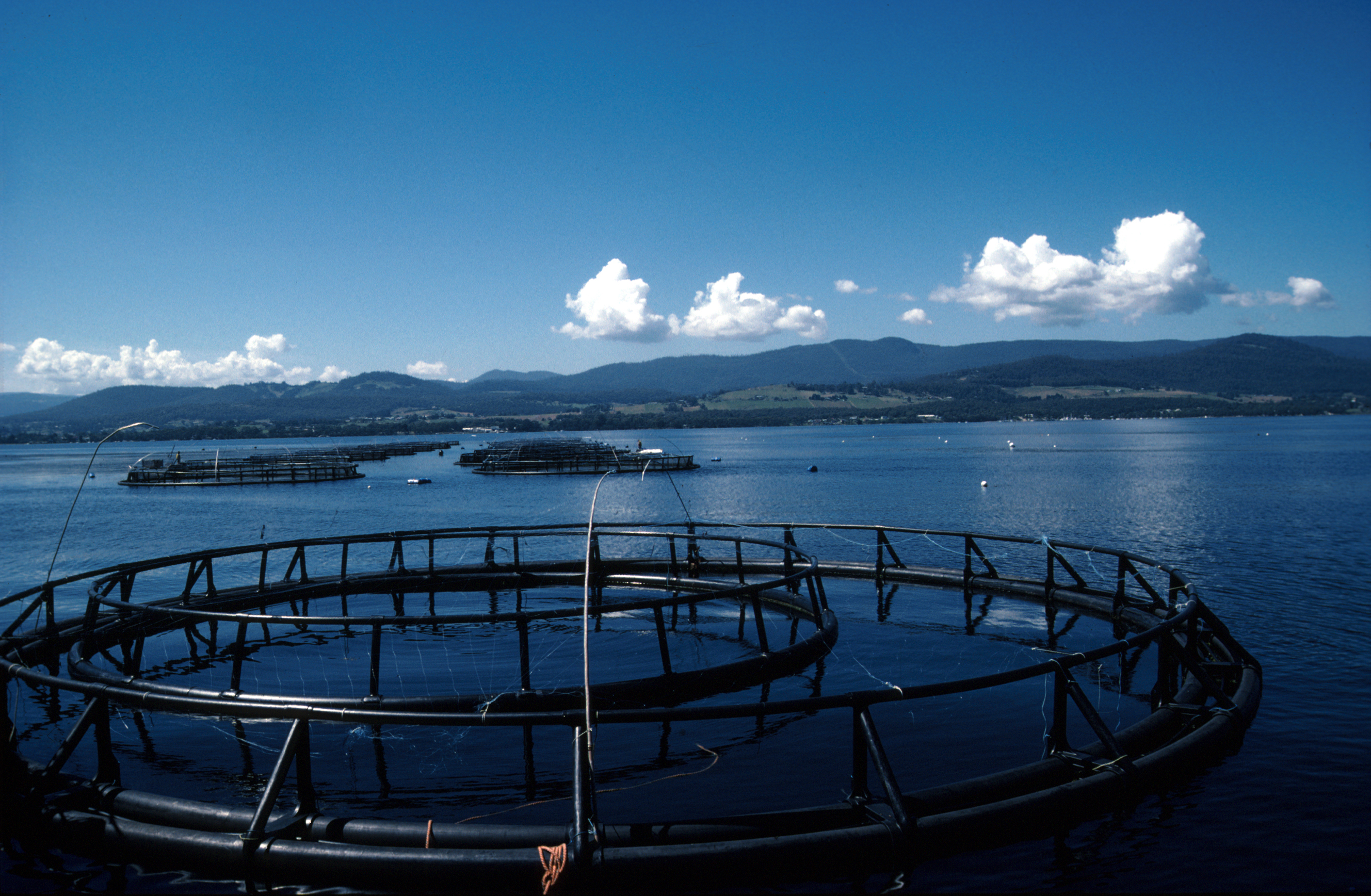
Photo of cage aquaculture located in Australia

Aquaculture is defined as the farming of aquatic organisms in controlled environments for the purpose of providing food and resources for humans. Aquaculture can take place in both marine and freshwater environments, however, because this is the saltwater fish page this entry will only cover the effects of aquaculture on marine fishes. The rising global demand for fish has contributed to the increase in aquaculture. Due to the decline of many wild fish stocks, aquaculture is the fastest growing food production system that contributes about 50% of the worlds fish supply. There is a lot of debate on whether or not aquaculture is an environmentally sustainable practice, yet the socioeconomic benefits that humans receive is tough to argue against. That being said there are significant negative effects that aquaculture, especially cage aquaculture, has on the surrounding environment.

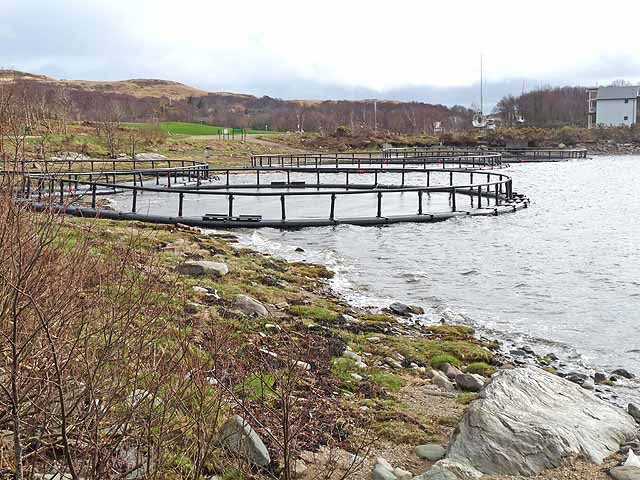
Cage Aquaculture for fishing

Cage aquaculture involves rearing aquatic organisms in natural water sources while enclosed in a mesh/net cage that allows water from the surrounding environment to freely flow in and out. Cage aquaculture in marine environments has been particularly controversial because of the effects it has on the surrounding ecosystem thus, affecting wild marine fish populations. The main impacts of cage aquaculture are reduced water quality from fish sewage, high potential of genetic pollution of wild stocks due to escapees from aquaculture cages and the possibility of introducing an invasive species if the fish being reared are non-native . Fish sewage is the combination of fish feed, fecal material and antibiotics that is accumulated on the seafloor and in the water column from fish that are being farmed. It is not only harmful to wild fish stocks but it also poses a threat to marine plant life which is often a food source for wild fish stocks. Fish sewage is harmful because it pollutes the surrounding ecosystem and can cause problems like eutrophication, transmission of parasites and diseases to wild populations and developmental abnormalities on surrounding wild fish. Genetic pollution of wild fish populations is a common risk that cage aquaculture faces. For example, there are many scientific papers that have examined the effects of Atlantic Salmon escaping from their enclosures and interacting with wild populations. Farmed salmon have lower fitness (low survival rates and reproductive success) than a wild salmon would due to differences in artificial and natural selection. Artificial selection that chooses phenotypic traits that are desired for human consumption will alter the genetics of wild stocks if farmed fish interact and breed with wild populations. This would result in the reduction of fitness related traits that wild stocks possess which is a serious threat to these populations.

== Categorization of saltwater fish by habitats ==
- Coastal fish (also offshore fish or neritic fish) inhabit the sea between the shoreline and the edge of the continental shelf.
- Deep-sea fish live below the photic zone of the ocean, where not enough light penetrates for photosynthesis to occur.
- Pelagic fish live near the surface of the sea or a lake.
- Demersal fish live on or near the bottom of the sea or a lake.
- Coral reef fish are associated with a coral reef.
