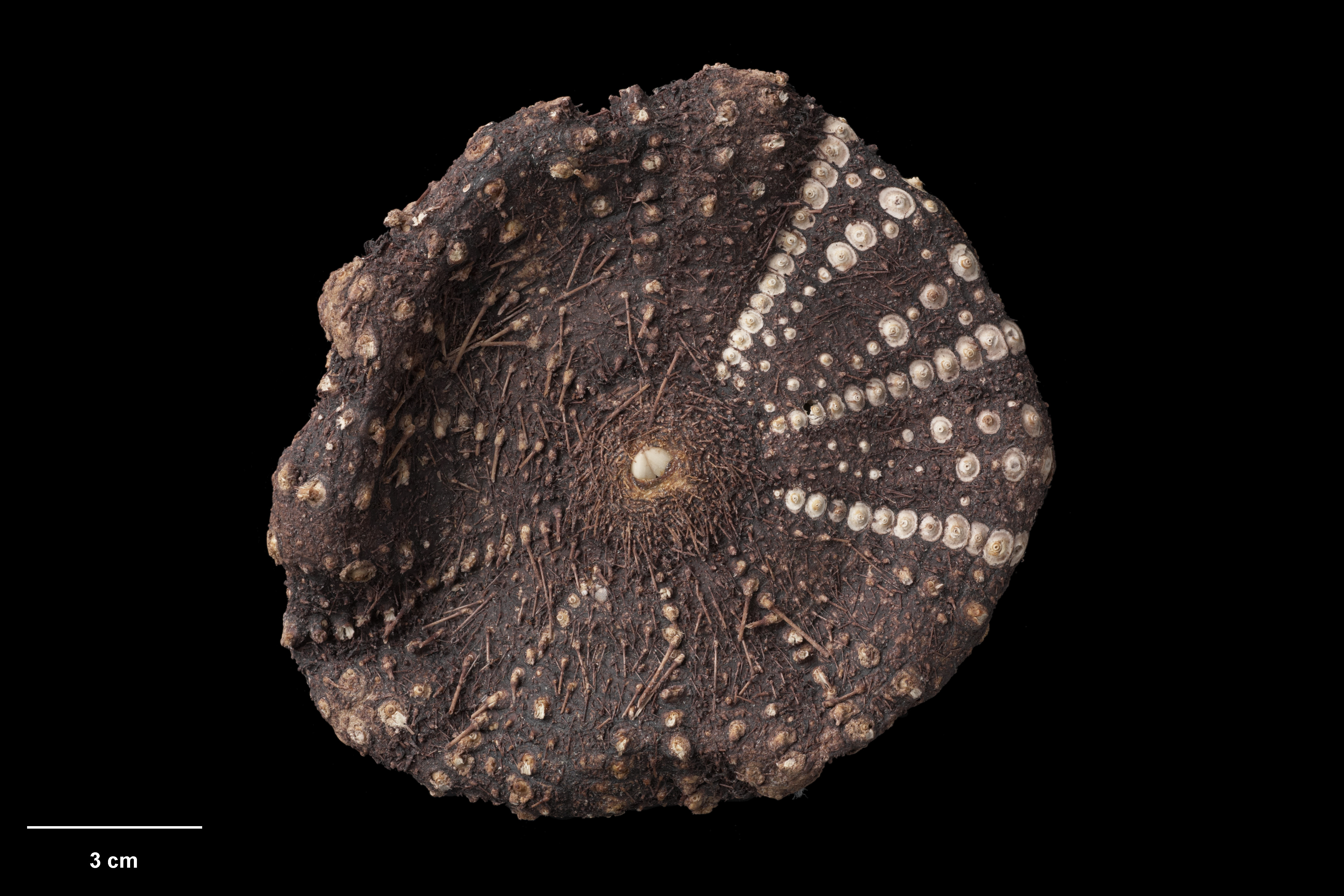

Scientific classification
- Kingdom: Animalia
- Phylum: Echinodermata
- Class: Echinoidea
- Order: Echinothurioida
- Family: Echinothuriidae
- Genus: Araeosoma
- Species: A. coriacea

Binomial name
- Araeosoma coriacea (A. Agassiz, 1879)

= Araeosoma coriacea =

Species of sea urchin

Araeosoma coriacea is a species of sea urchin of the family Echinothuriidae. Its armour is covered with spines. It is placed in the genus Araeosoma and lives in the sea. A. coriacea was first scientifically described in 1879 by Alexander Emanuel Agassiz, an American scientist.
