= Araeosoma tessellatum =

Scientific classification
- Kingdom: Animalia
- Phylum: Echinodermata
- Class: Echinoidea
- Order: Echinothurioida
- Family: Echinothuriidae
- Genus: Araeosoma
- Species: A. tessellatum

Binomial name
- Araeosoma tessellatum (A. Agassiz, 1879)

Species of sea urchin

Araeosoma tessellatum is a species of sea urchin of the family Echinothuriidae. Its armour is covered with spines. It is placed in the genus Araeosoma and lives in the sea. A. tessellatum was first scientifically described in 1879 by Alexander Emanuel Agassiz.
