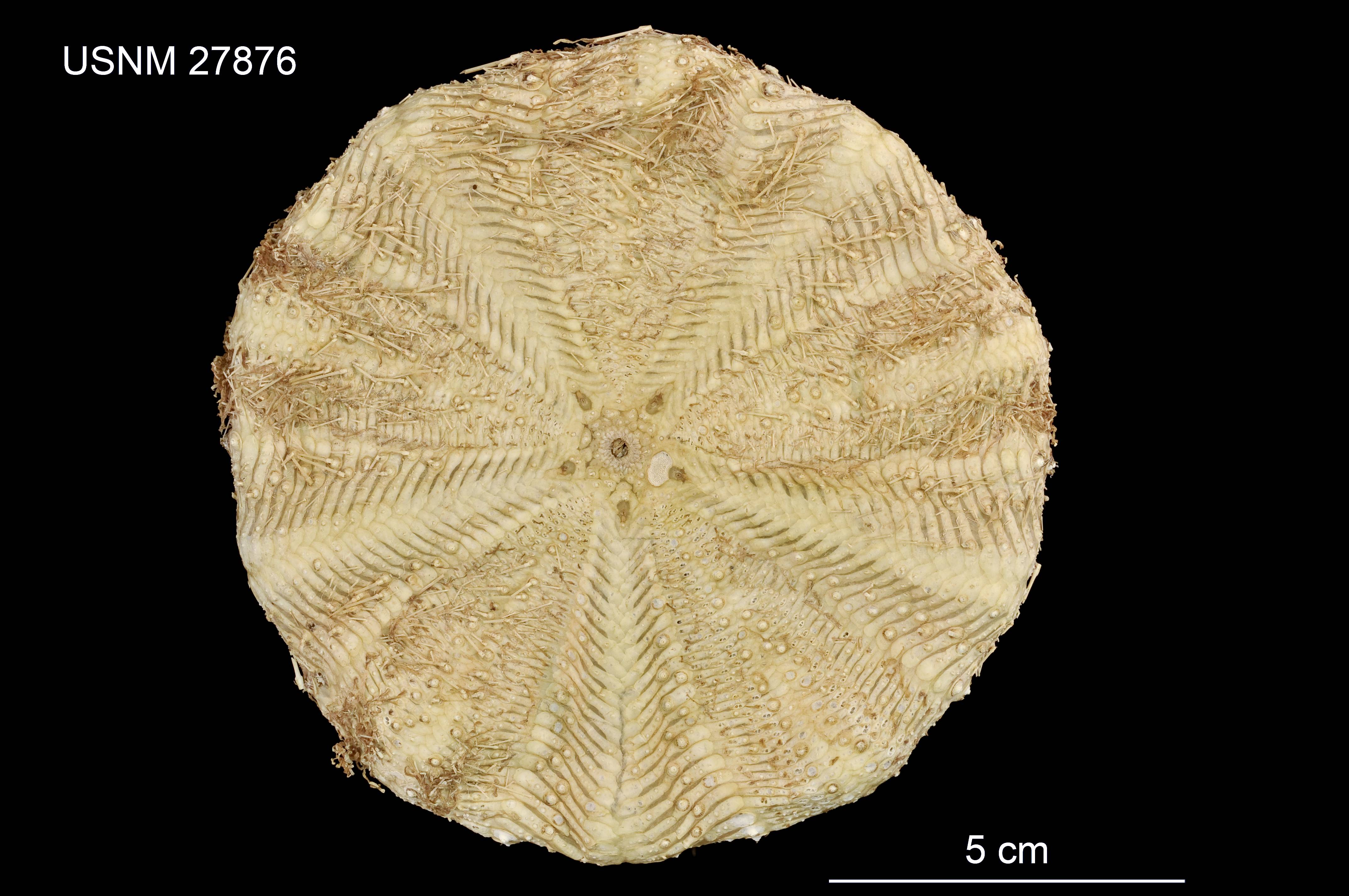

Scientific classification
- Kingdom: Animalia
- Phylum: Echinodermata
- Class: Echinoidea
- Order: Echinothurioida
- Family: Echinothuriidae
- Genus: Araeosoma
- Species: A. leptaleum

Binomial name
- Araeosoma leptaleum (A. Agassiz & Hubert Lyman Clark, 1909)

= Araeosoma leptaleum =

Species of sea urchin

Araeosoma leptaleum is a species of sea urchin of the family Echinothuriidae. Its armour is covered with spines. It is placed in the genus Araeosoma and lives in the sea. A. leptaleum was first scientifically described in 1909 by Alexander Emanuel Agassiz & Hubert Lyman Clark.
