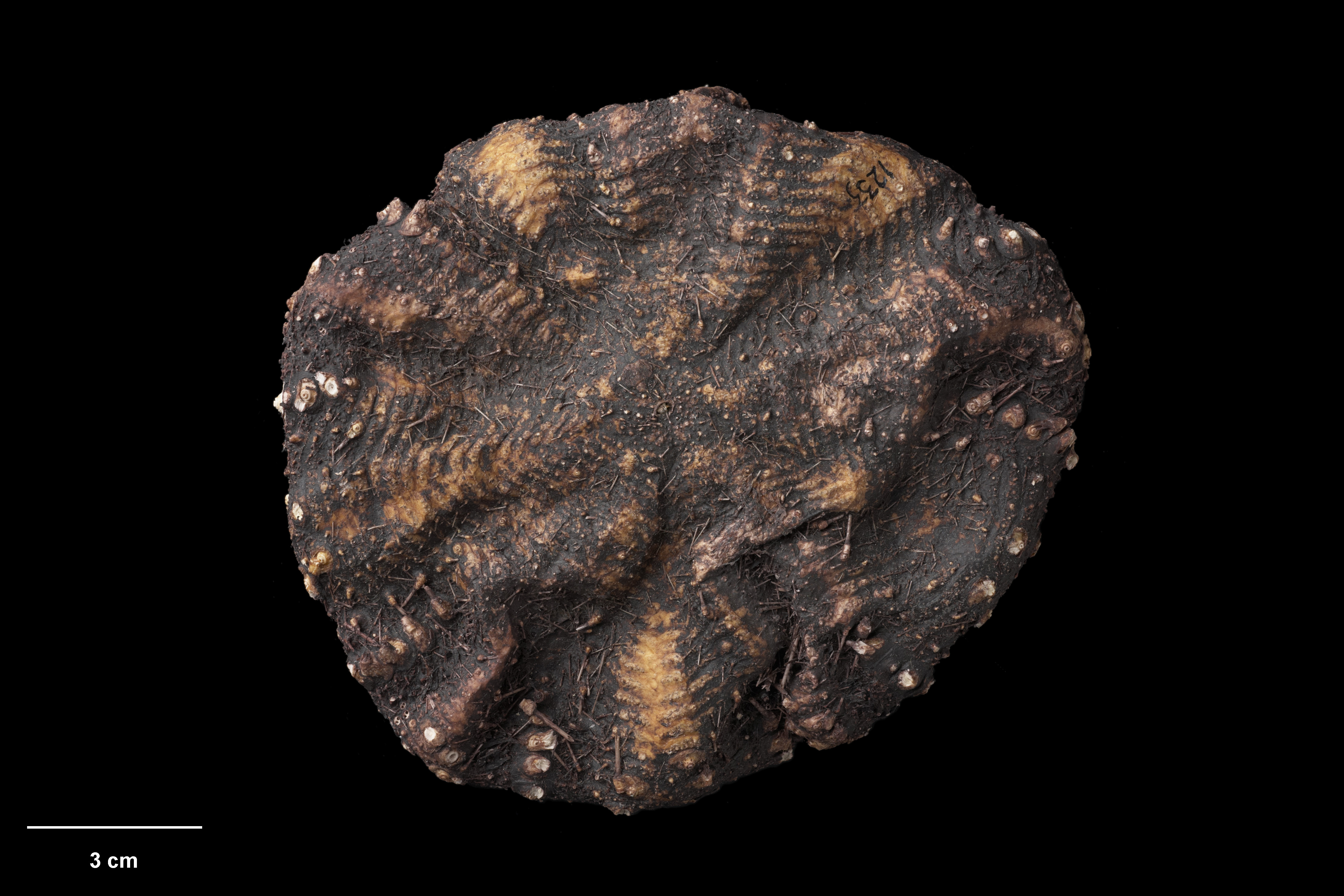

Scientific classification
- Kingdom: Animalia
- Phylum: Echinodermata
- Class: Echinoidea
- Order: Echinothurioida
- Family: Echinothuriidae
- Genus: Araeosoma
- Species: A. coriaceum

Binomial name
- Araeosoma coriaceum (A. Agassiz, 1879)

= Araeosoma coriaceum =

Species of sea urchin

Araeosoma coriaceum is a species of sea urchin of the family Echinothuriidae. Its armour is covered with spines. It is placed in the genus Araeosoma and lives in the sea. A. coriaceum was first scientifically described in 1879 by Alexander Emanuel Agassiz, an American scientist.
