= Calveriosoma gracile =

Scientific classification
- Domain: Eukaryota
- Kingdom: Animalia
- Phylum: Echinodermata
- Class: Echinoidea
- Order: Echinothurioida
- Family: Echinothuriidae
- Genus: Calveriosoma
- Species: C. gracile

Binomial name
- Calveriosoma gracile (A. Agassiz, 1881)

Synonyms
- Araeosoma gracile (A. Agassiz, 1881); Araeosoma pyrochloa (A. Agassiz & H.L. Clark, 1907); Asthenosoma gracile A. Agassiz, 1881; Asthenosoma pyrochloa A. Agassiz & H.L. Clark, 1907; Asthenosoma tessellatum A. Agassiz & H.L. Clark, 1907; Calveria gracilis (A. Agassiz, 1881)

Species of sea urchin

Calveriosoma gracile is a species of sea urchin in the order Echinothurioida. It is a deep water species and is found on the seabed in western parts of the Pacific Ocean at depths of 200 to 800 metres (660 to 2,620 ft).

== Description ==
Calveriosoma gracile grows to a diameter of about 2.4 cm (1 in) and is scantily covered in short spines. It has a somewhat flattened globose shape resembling a cushion. It is one of a group of echinoderms that instead of having a rigid test consisting of fused calcareous plates, has a flexible leathery skin with loose, wedge-shaped plates embedded in it. This makes the boundaries between the plates easy to observe. Other distinguishing characteristics include hollow spines tipped with hoof-like structures and simple mouthparts. Echinoderms in this order were known only as fossils having been found in deposits such as the chalk beds of southern England dating back to the Cretaceous era. It was only in the Challenger expedition of the 1870s that living members of the group were found, when deep ocean floors were dredged to investigate the organisms living at these great depths.

== Distribution and habitat ==
Calveriosoma gracile is found on the seabed at depths between 200 and 800 metres (660 and 2,620 ft). It is known to occur in the Sea of Japan and near the Philippines and New Zealand on soft sediments.

== Biology ==
Calveriosoma gracile is a scavenger and feeds on algal material and other organic detritus that sinks to the sea floor. Little is known of its behaviour and life cycle but it is likely to have yolky, lecithotrophic eggs that float towards the surface before falling back to the seabed as is the case in its more studied relative, Phormosoma placenta.
