= Araeosoma eurypatum =

Scientific classification
- Domain: Eukaryota
- Kingdom: Animalia
- Phylum: Echinodermata
- Class: Echinoidea
- Order: Echinothurioida
- Family: Echinothuriidae
- Genus: Araeosoma
- Species: A. eurypatum

Binomial name
- Araeosoma eurypatum (Agassiz & Clark, 1909)

Species of sea urchin

Araeosoma eurypatum is a species of sea urchin of the family Echinothuriidae. Its armour is covered with spines. It is placed in the genus Araeosoma and lives in the sea. A. eurypatum was first scientifically described in 1909 by Alexander Agassiz and Hubert Clark.
