= Araeosoma belli =

Scientific classification
- Domain: Eukaryota
- Kingdom: Animalia
- Phylum: Echinodermata
- Class: Echinoidea
- Order: Echinothurioida
- Family: Echinothuriidae
- Genus: Araeosoma
- Species: A. belli

Binomial name
- Araeosoma belli (Mortensen, 1903)

Species of sea urchin

Araeosoma belli is a species of sea urchin of the family Echinothuriidae. Its armour is covered with spines. It is placed in the genus Araeosoma and lives throughout the Caribbean Sea as well as areas around the Gulf of Mexico. A. belli was first scientifically described in 1903 by Ole Theodor Jensen Mortensen, a Danish zoologist.
