= Araeosoma alternatum =

Scientific classification
- Domain: Eukaryota
- Kingdom: Animalia
- Phylum: Echinodermata
- Class: Echinoidea
- Order: Echinothurioida
- Family: Echinothuriidae
- Genus: Araeosoma
- Species: A. alternatum

Binomial name
- Araeosoma alternatum (Mortensen, 1934)

Species of sea urchin

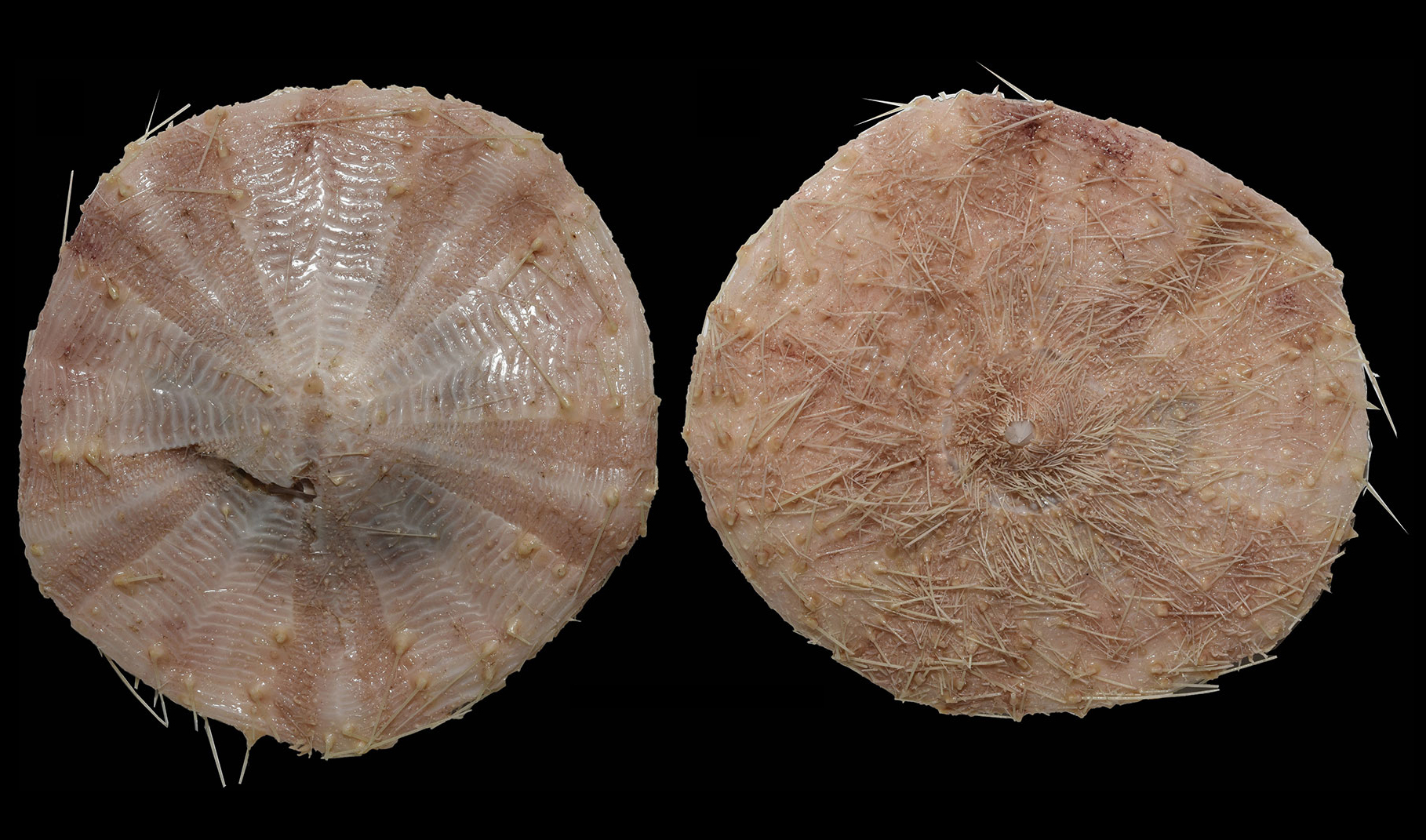
Araeosoma alternatum

Araeosoma alternatum is a species of sea urchin of the family Echinothuriidae. Its armour is covered with spines. It is placed in the genus Araeosoma and lives in the sea. A. alternatum was first scientifically described in 1934 by Ole Theodor Jensen Mortensen, a Danish zoologist.
