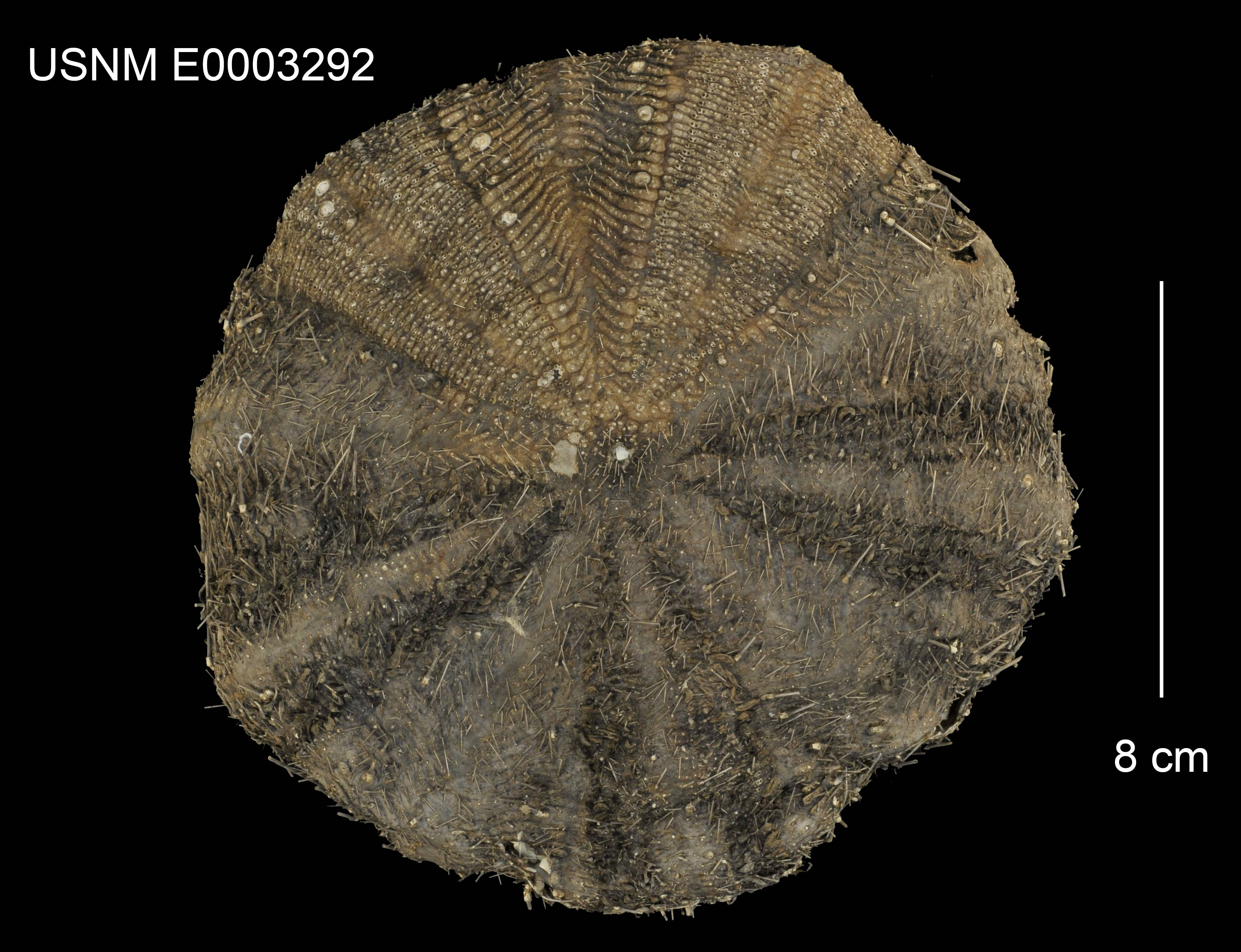

Scientific classification
- Kingdom: Animalia
- Phylum: Echinodermata
- Class: Echinoidea
- Order: Echinothurioida
- Family: Echinothuriidae
- Genus: Araeosoma
- Species: A. parviungulatum

Binomial name
- Araeosoma parviungulatum (Mortensen, 1934)

= Araeosoma parviungulatum =

Species of sea urchin

Araeosoma parviungulatum is a species of sea urchin of the family Echinothuriidae. Its armour is covered with spines. It is placed in the genus Araeosoma and lives in the sea. A. parviungulatum was first scientifically described in 1934 by Ole Theodor Jensen Mortensen.
