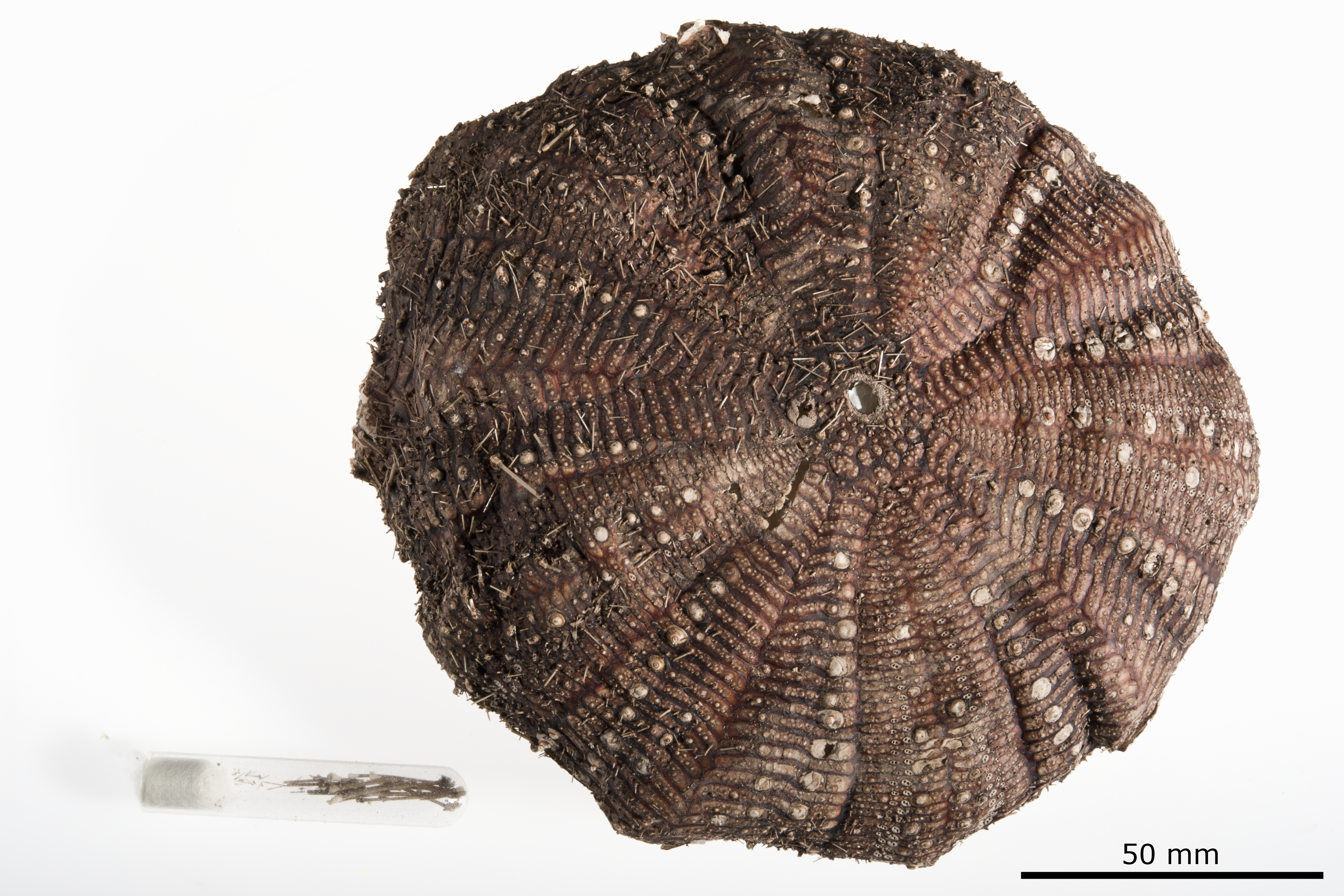
- Syntype of Araeosoma violaceum Mortensen, 1903

Scientific classification
- Domain: Eukaryota
- Kingdom: Animalia
- Phylum: Echinodermata
- Class: Echinoidea
- Order: Echinothurioida
- Family: Echinothuriidae
- Genus: Araeosoma
- Species: A. violaceum

Binomial name
- Araeosoma violaceum (Mortensen, 1903)

= Araeosoma violaceum =

Species of sea urchin

Araeosoma violaceum is a species of sea urchin of the family Echinothuriidae. Its armour is covered with spines. It is placed in the genus Araeosoma and lives in the sea. A. violaceum was first scientifically described in 1903 by Ole Theodor Jensen Mortensen.
