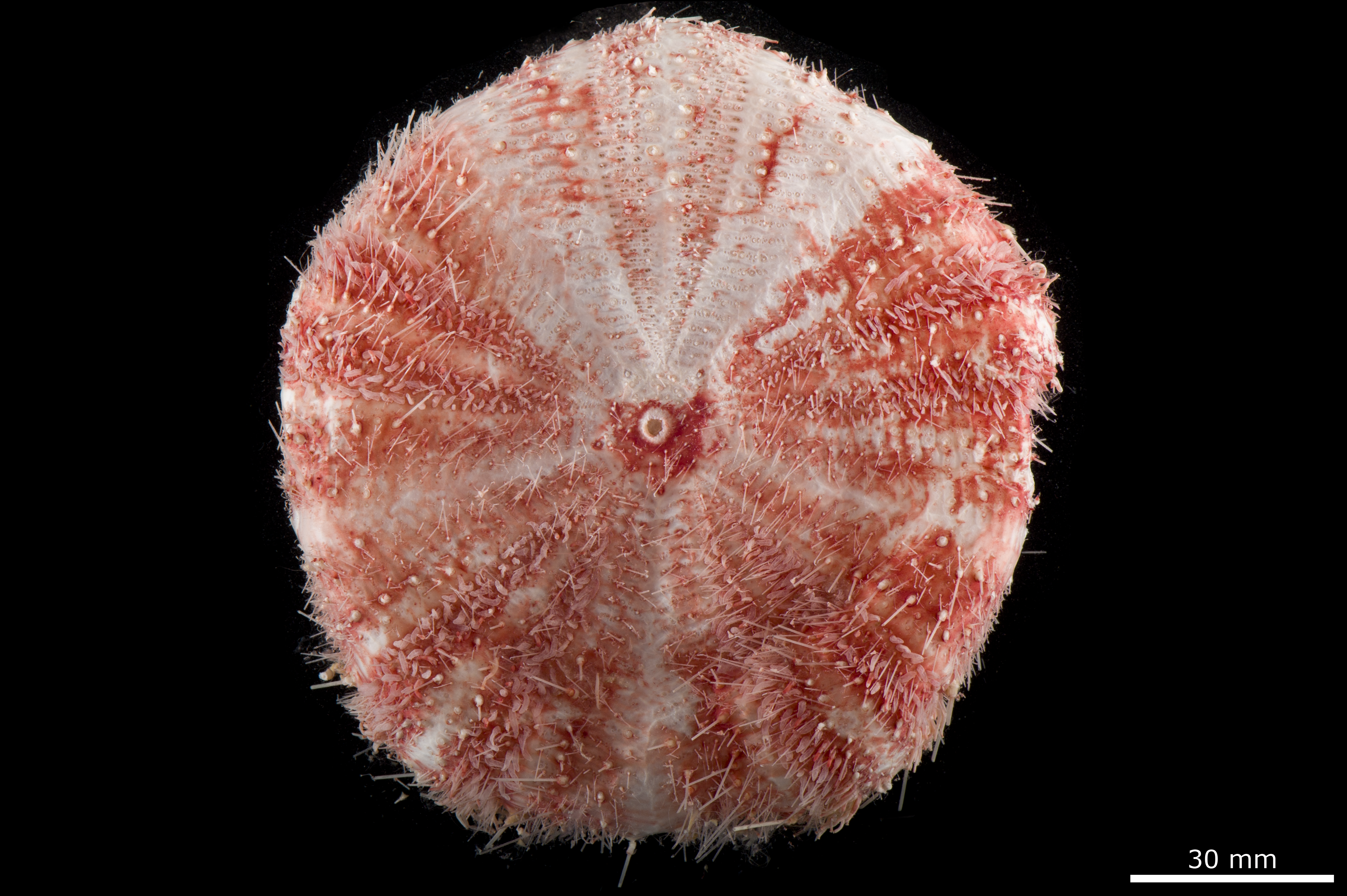

Scientific classification
- Kingdom: Animalia
- Phylum: Echinodermata
- Class: Echinoidea
- Order: Echinothurioida
- Family: Echinothuriidae
- Genus: Araeosoma
- Species: A. splendens

Binomial name
- Araeosoma splendens (Mortensen, 1934)

= Araeosoma splendens =

Species of sea urchin

Araeosoma splendens is a species of sea urchin of the family Echinothuriidae. Its armour is covered with spines. It is placed in the genus Araeosoma and lives in the sea. A. splendens was first scientifically described in 1934 by Ole Theodor Jensen Mortensen.
