= Araeosoma fenestratum =

Scientific classification
- Kingdom: Animalia
- Phylum: Echinodermata
- Class: Echinoidea
- Order: Echinothurioida
- Family: Echinothuriidae
- Genus: Araeosoma
- Species: A. fenestratum

Binomial name
- Araeosoma fenestratum (Thomson, 1872)

Species of sea urchin

Araeosoma fenestratum is a species of sea urchin of the family Echinothuriidae. Its armour is covered with spines. It is placed in the genus Araeosoma and lives in the sea. A. fenestratum was first scientifically described in 1872 by Thomson.
