= Araeosoma paucispinum =

Scientific classification
- Kingdom: Animalia
- Phylum: Echinodermata
- Class: Echinoidea
- Order: Echinothurioida
- Family: Echinothuriidae
- Genus: Araeosoma
- Species: A. paucispinum

Binomial name
- Araeosoma paucispinum (Hubert Lyman Clark, 1924)

Species of sea urchin

Araeosoma paucispinum is a species of sea urchin of the family Echinothuriidae. Its armour is covered with spines. It is placed in the genus Araeosoma and lives in the sea. A. paucispinum was first scientifically described in 1924 by Hubert Lyman Clark, an American zoologist.
