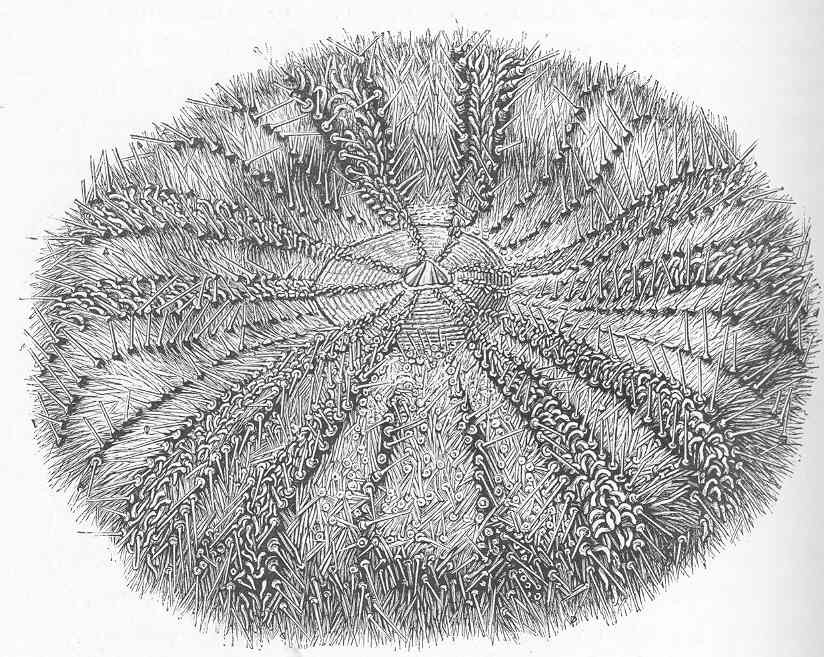

Scientific classification
- Kingdom: Animalia
- Phylum: Echinodermata
- Class: Echinoidea
- Order: Echinothurioida
- Family: Echinothuriidae
- Genus: Calveriosoma
- Species: C. hystrix

Binomial name
- Calveriosoma hystrix (Thomson, 1872)

= Calveriosoma hystrix =

Species of sea urchin

Calveriosoma hystrix is a species of sea urchin of the family Echinothuriidae. Their armour is covered with spines. Calveriosoma hystrix was first scientifically described in 1872 by Thomson. C. hystrix has a structure known as a siphon, which is a thin tube that runs parallel to the stomach. While its function is not certain, it likely serves a way of moving water from the esophagus to the beginning of the intestine.
