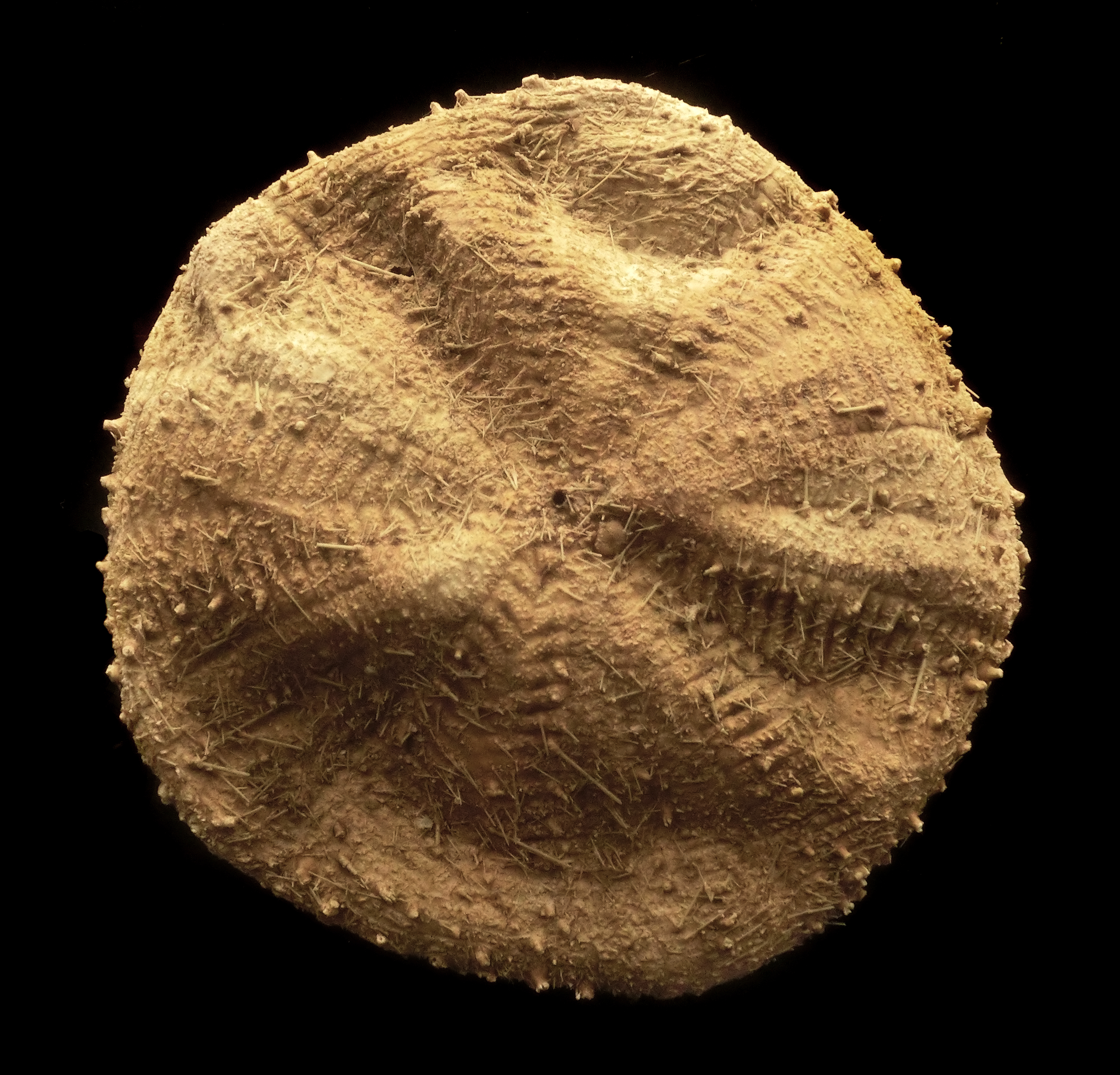

Scientific classification
- Domain: Eukaryota
- Kingdom: Animalia
- Phylum: Echinodermata
- Class: Echinoidea
- Order: Echinothurioida
- Family: Echinothuriidae
- Genus: Araeosoma
- Species: A. owstoni

Binomial name
- Araeosoma owstoni (Mortensen, 1904)

= Araeosoma owstoni =

Species of sea urchin

Araeosoma owstoni is a species of sea urchin of the family Echinothuriidae. Its armour is covered with spines. It is placed in the genus Araeosoma and lives in the sea. A. owstoni was first scientifically described in 1904 by Ole Theodor Jensen Mortensen.
