= Alan Owston =

British naturalist (1853–1915)

Alan Owston (1853–1915) was born on 7 August 1853 at Pirbright, Surrey and was buried on 30 November 1915 at Yokohama in Japan. He was a collector of Asian wildlife, businessman and yachtsman, and founded the Yokohama Yacht Club in Japan. Alan Owston left England for Asia in 1871, working as a merchant in Japan and was also busy as an amateur naturalist.

The Owston's palm civet or Owston's civet (Chrotogale owstoni) is named after him, as is the genus of bandfishes Owstonia, the frog Zhangixalus owstoni, and the sea-urchin Araeosoma owstoni

Owston collected or arranged to have collected a wide range of marine specimens, notably fish from Japan and China, a collection once hailed "one of the most important collections of its kind". Carnegie Museum of Natural History Pittsburgh has a collection of 1,364 of his Asian fishes. Some other animals named after him include the fish Roughskin dogfish, Centroscymnus owstonii; the Trismegistus owstoni; a clam, a frog, and woodpecker. His bird collection was also hailed for "the prodigious number of bird specimens". His collections can be found in many museums today, notably the Smithsonian collection of his reptiles, birds and fish. He is also noted for his deep-sea sponge collection at the Natural History Museum, London which also has a charming Victorian photographic portrait of him from Japan with one of his giant sponges.

As a yachtsman and founder of Yokohama Yacht Club, he was reputed to own its fastest yacht, the Golden Hind. He was unusual as an Englishman working in Japan as it opened to western influence and business interests, being buried in the foreigners' cemetery in Yokohama.

== Family tree and history ==
AHis father Rev. Francis Owston was the Vicar at Pirbright, Surrey, England for 40 years, having received his MA degree from Cambridge during 1850 and married Alan's mother Eliza Stedman (daughter of Dr. James Stedman and Sarah Remington) on 16 Apr 1850 in St. Nicolas' Church, Guildford, Surrey, England. Alan Owston had an older brother, Captain Francis Owston (born 27 Apr 1852 Pirbright, Surrey - died 27 Jan 1927 England, a sea captain working from England and also later a businessman in Japan) and a younger sister, Bertha Owston (24 Jun 1864 Pirbright, Surrey, England - 1952 Leavenheath, Suffolk, England).

Alan was married twice to Japanese women and had several children. More biographical information is given in the family tree section of the external links.
