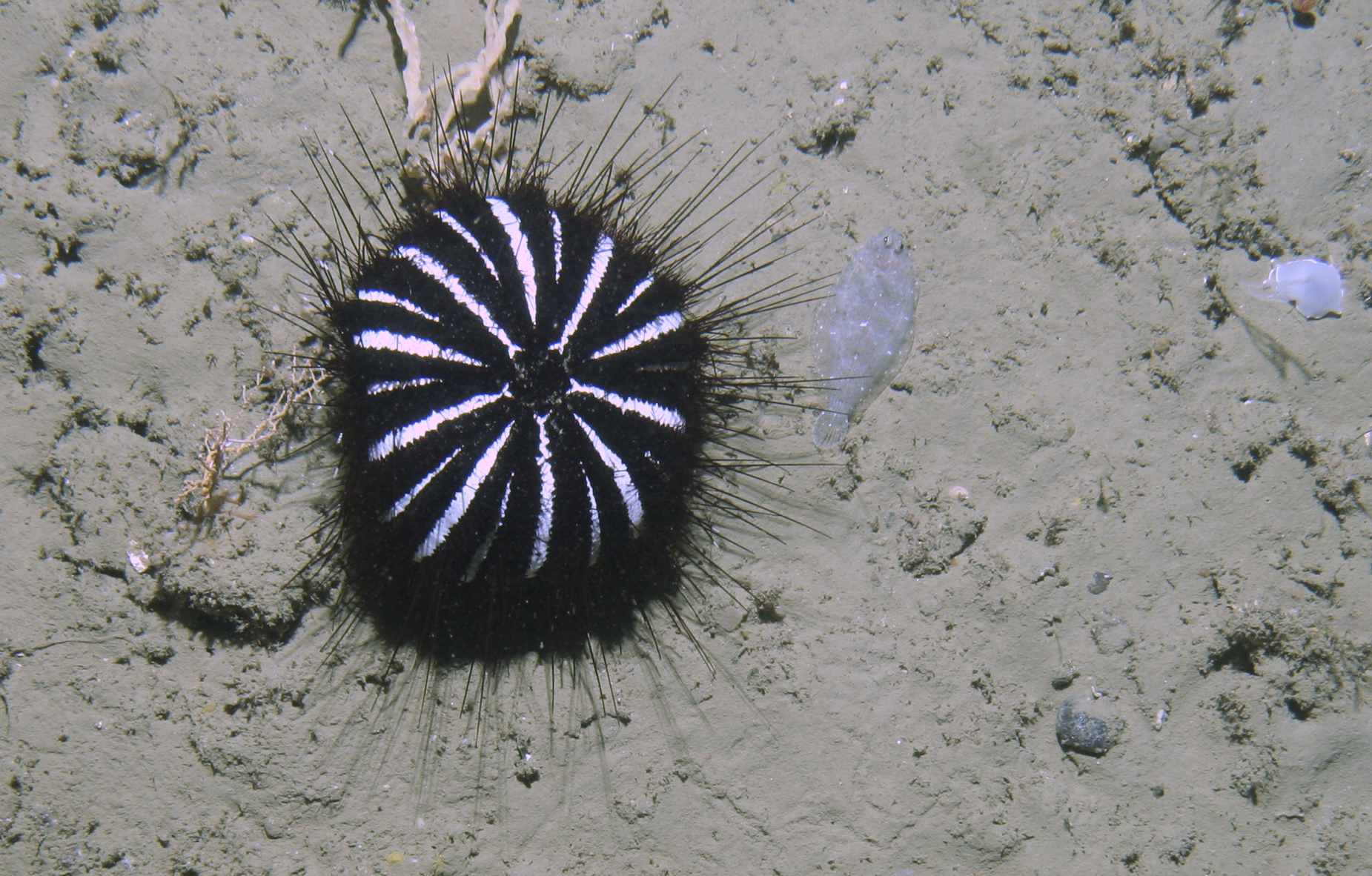
- Araeosoma thetidis (New Zealand, 188m depth).

Scientific classification
- Kingdom: Animalia
- Phylum: Echinodermata
- Class: Echinoidea
- Order: Echinothurioida
- Family: Echinothuriidae
- Subfamily: Echinothuriinae
- Genus: Araeosoma; Mortensen, 1903

Species
- See text

= Araeosoma =

Araeosoma Temporal range: Pliocene–Recent

Genus of sea urchins

Araeosoma is a genus of deep-sea sea urchins in the family Echinothuriidae.

== Description and characteristics ==
Species in this genus are distinguished from other Echinothuriidae by their lack of ophicephalous pedicellariae (despite presence of dactylous ones), and the presence of prominent membranous gaps along horizontal sutures in interambulacral zones of both oral and aboral surfaces.

== Taxonomy ==
The World Echinoidea Database recognises these species:

- Araeosoma alternatum Mortensen, 1934
- Araeosoma anatirostrum Anderson, 2013
- Araeosoma bakeri Anderson, 2013
- Araeosoma belli Mortensen, 1903
- Araeosoma bidentatum Anderson, 2013
- Araeosoma brunnichi Ravn, 1928 †
- Araeosoma coriaceum (Agassiz, 1879)
- Araeosoma eurypatum Agassiz& Clark, 1909
- Araeosoma fenestratum (Thomson, 1872)
- Araeosoma leppienae Anderson, 2013
- Araeosoma leptaleum Agassiz & Clark, 1909
- Araeosoma migratum Anderson, 2013
- Araeosoma mortenseni Ravn, 1928 †
- Araeosoma owstoni Mortensen, 1904
- Araeosoma parviungulatum Mortensen, 1934
- Araeosoma paucispinum H.L. Clark, 1925
- Araeosoma splendens Mortensen, 1934
- Araeosoma tertii Anderson, 2013
- Araeosoma tessellatum (Agassiz, 1879)
- Araeosoma thetidis (Clark, 1909)
- Araeosoma violaceum Mortensen, 1903

"†" means an extinct taxon.
