= Kamptosomatidae =

Scientific classification
- Kingdom: Animalia
- Phylum: Echinodermata
- Class: Echinoidea
- Order: Echinothurioida
- Family: Kamptosomatidae; Mortensen, 1934

Family of sea urchins

Kamptosomatidae is a family of echinoderms belonging to the order Echinothurioida.

Genera:

- Kamptosoma Mortensen, 1903
