= Calveriosoma =

Scientific classification
- Kingdom: Animalia
- Phylum: Echinodermata
- Class: Echinoidea
- Order: Echinothurioida
- Family: Echinothuriidae
- Subfamily: Echinothuriinae
- Genus: Calveriosoma; Mortensen, 1934

Genus of sea urchins

Calveriosoma is a genus of echinoderms belonging to the family Echinothuriidae.

The genus has almost cosmopolitan distribution.

Species:

- Calveriosoma gracile (A. Agassiz, 1881)
- Calveriosoma hystrix (Thomson, 1872)
