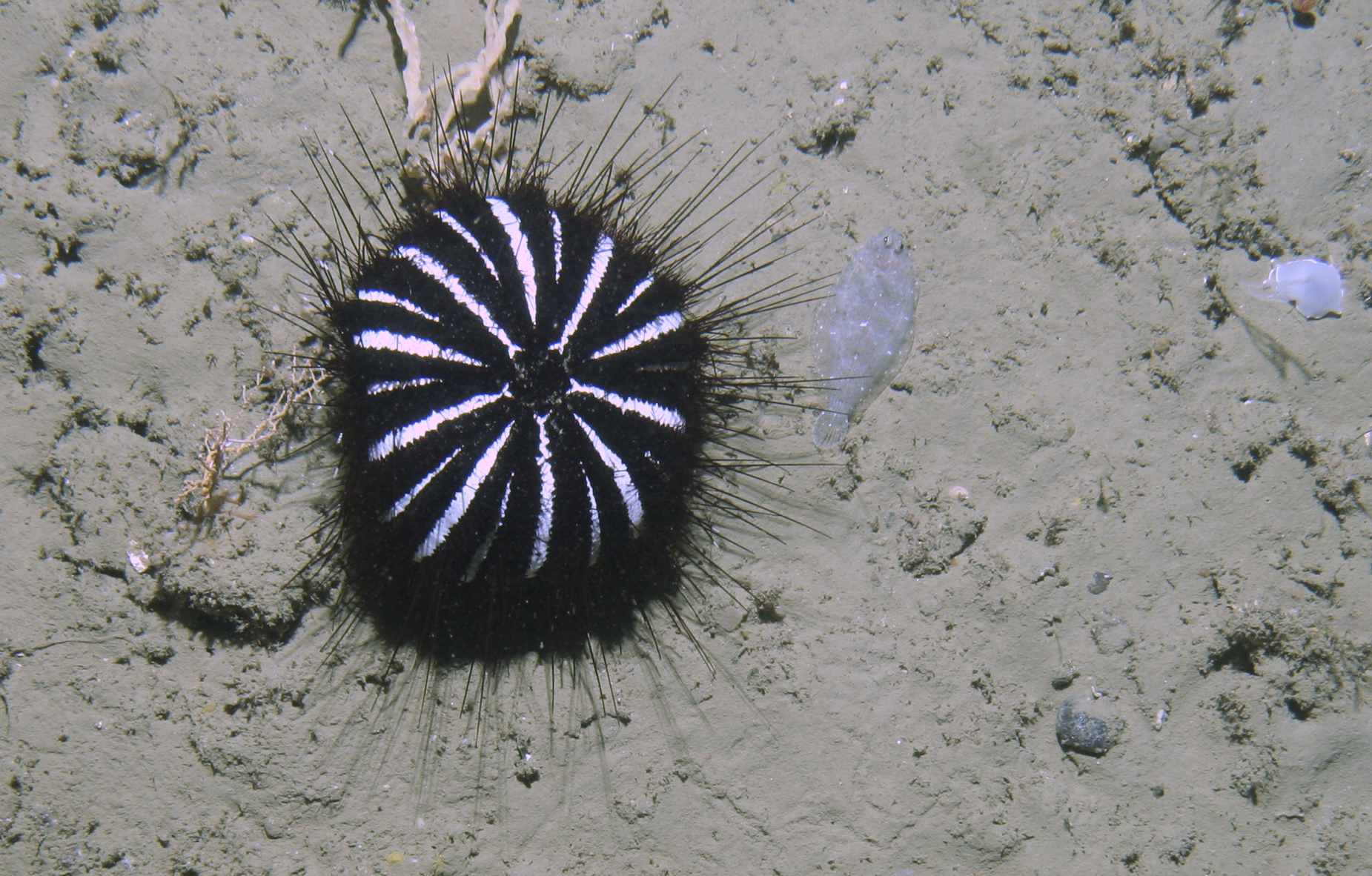
- Araeosoma thetidis (New Zealand, 188m depth)

Scientific classification
- Kingdom: Animalia
- Phylum: Echinodermata
- Class: Echinoidea
- Order: Echinothurioida
- Family: Echinothuriidae
- Genus: Araeosoma
- Species: A. thetidis

Binomial name
- Araeosoma thetidis (Hubert Lyman Clark, 1909)

= Araeosoma thetidis =

Species of sea urchin

Araeosoma thetidis is a species of sea urchin of the family Echinothuriidae that lives in deep sea off Australia and New Zealand. A. thetidis was first scientifically described in 1909 by Hubert Lyman Clark.
