= Pelanechinus =

Pelanechinus Temporal range: Middle Jurassic–Late Jurassic

Scientific classification
- Kingdom: Animalia
- Phylum: Echinodermata
- Class: Echinoidea
- Order: Echinothurioida
- Family: †Pelanechinidae
- Genus: †Pelanechinus; Keeping, 1878

Species
- See text

Extinct genus of sea urchins

Pelanechinus is an extinct genus of sea urchins in the order Echinothurioida. It is placed in the family Pelanechinidae and is in the stem group of echinoids.

== Species ==
Pelanechinus corallina † (Wright, 1858) – known from the Oxfordian and Late Jurassic of England.

Pelanechinus oolithicum † (Hess, 1972) – known from the Bajocian and Middle Jurassic of Switzerland. It was originally described as Pelanodiadema oolithicum Hess, 1972 (Pelanodiademinae Hess, 1972) but Pelanodiadema is now considered to be a synonym of Pelanechinus.

Pelanechinus triceps † Quenstedt 1858 – known from the Jura Mountains. It was originally described as Leptocidaris triceps but the genus Leptocidaris is now considered to be a junior synonym of Pelanechinus.

== Pelanechinus corallina ==
Pelanechinus corallina is the type species of the genus and was originally described from Yorkshire, England from a single fossilised specimen in which only the oral part of the test was preserved. Members of the Echinothurioida, including Pelanechinus, have flexible tests. In P. corallina the plates are fused in groups of three with a central large plate and two half-sized ones on either side. The groups of plates overlap in the way that roof tiles do. There is a large tubercle on every second or third central plate. Another incomplete specimen found later in the coral rag at Calne, England had a test with a diameter of 85 millimetres (3.3 in) and was somewhat dorso-ventrally flattened. That specimen was well-preserved with a single ambulacral area and most of two interambulacral areas present. The mouthparts and teeth were distinct with small overlapping plates surrounding the mouth is the peristomal area .

== Pelanechinus oolithicum ==
Pelanechinus oolithicum is known from Schinznach, Switzerland where well preserved fossils have been found. The plates are similarly fused in groups of three in the ambulacral area but there are three tubercles on the set, the central one being the largest. The pore pairs come in groups of three. The interambulacral areas are about three times as wide as the ambulacral areas and have one perforated primary and several secondary tubercles on each plate. The spines are slender and filled with a spongy material.

== Pelanechinus triceps ==
Pelanechinus triceps is known from the Jura. The type specimen has a diameter of 34 millimetres (1.3 in) and a height of 17.5 millimetres (0.69 in). The primary tubercles are perforated and smooth.
