= Rodolphe L. Agassiz =

American polo player and businessman

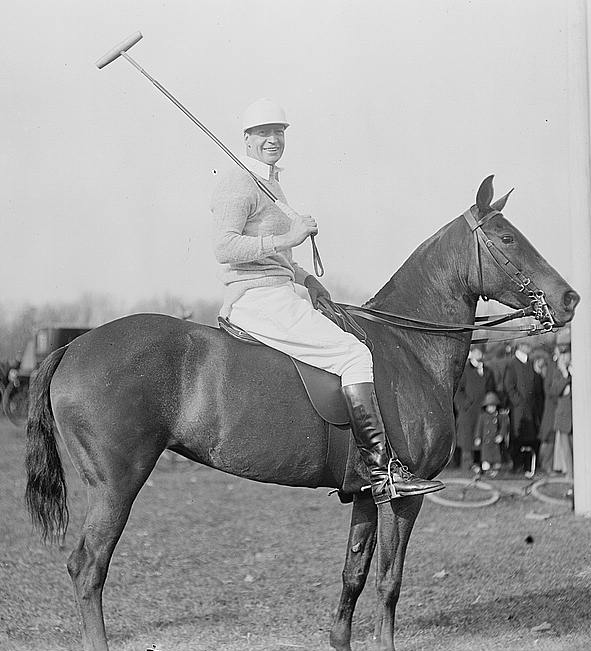
- R. L. Agassiz, circa 1910
- Born: Rodolphe Louis Agassiz; September 3, 1871; Cambridge, Massachusetts, US
- Died: July 31, 1933 (aged 61); Prides Crossing, Beverly, Massachusetts, US
- Occupation: Businessman
- Employer: Calumet and Hecla Mining Company
- Organization: Myopia Hunt Club
- Known for: Polo player
- Father: Alexander Agassiz

Rodolphe Louis Agassiz (September 3, 1871 – July 31, 1933) was an American polo player, businessman, and clubman. He participated in the International Polo Cup, representing America. He was a ten goal polo champion at the international level. He left polo in 1914 to manage his business interests. Agassiz served as president and chairman of the board of the Calumet and Hecla Mining Company and of numerous other copper-related companies.

== Early life ==
Agassiz was born on September 3, 1871, in Cambridge, Massachusetts. His parents were Anna Russell and Alexander Agassiz, a professor at Harvard University's Lawrence Scientific School, a pioneer in the copper industry, and one of the foremost naturalists of his time. His paternal grandfather, Louis Agassiz, was an influential biologist and geologist who became wealthy due to investments in copper mining in Michigan.

Agassiz graduated from Harvard University with an AB in 1892. While there, he was a member of Delta Kappa Epsilon (aka The Dickey Club). He also played on the Harvard polo team. In July 1888, he was thrown from his horse during a match in Newport, Rhode Island, and seriously injured, resulting in Agassiz being unconscious for some time.

== Career ==
=== Polo ===
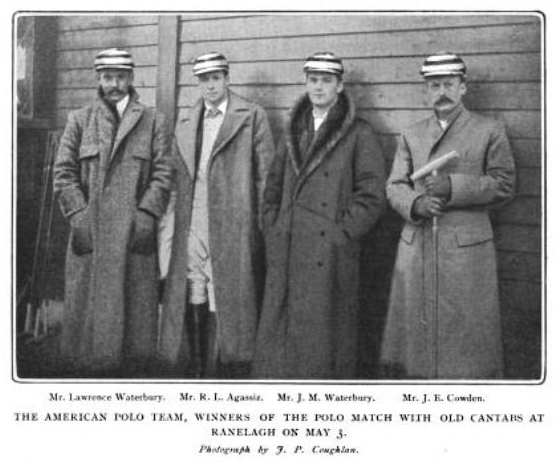
The winning 1902 American polo team, 1with Agassiz second from the left.

Agassiz played polo for the Myopia Hunt Club and became "one of the most prominent polo players in the country". His international handicap was ten goals, placing him in the elite group of ten goal polo champions. He played in many international polo matches, including representing America for the 1902 International Polo Cup and again in 1905.

Agassiz was injured in a match in Newport in the summer of 1906 and underwent surgery in January 1906. He was struck in the mouth by a mallet at a match in Newport on August 30, 1906, breaking three of his front teeth.

Agassiz was captain of the Myopia team in 1908. He was a member of the American team that played in the match against the English at Georgian Court in 1910. In 1911, he was on the American team that competed against the English at Westbury, Long Island. He also played on the American team for the International Polo Cup in 1913.

In March 1912, Agassiz became the president of the Westchester Polo Club, the group responsible for the International Polo Cup. However, in February 1914, he sold his polo ponies and withdrew from competition to spend more time on business matters. He continued to help prepare the American team for its match with British polo players in the summer of 1914.

Agassiz was also a horse show judge and was a director of the Boston Horse Show Company and the Country Club Horse Show. In 1908, he was a polo pony and stallion judge for the National Horse Show Association's annual event at Madison Square Garden. He was considered one of the best polo pony judges in the United States.

=== Business ===
In May 1901, Agassiz became a director of the board of the State Street Trust Company of Boston. In August 1905, he became the secretary and treasurer of the Calumet and Hecla Consolidated Copper Company, a business managed by his father. He was also a director of the Allouez Mining Company, La Salle Copper Company, and the Osceolo Consolidated Mining Co. He became a director of the American Loan & Trust Company of Boston in January 1907.

After his father died in 1910, Agassiz became the vice president of Calumet and Hecla Consolidated Copper Company. In 1911, he was president and chairman of the board of the Calumet and Hecla Consolidated Copper Company. In 1911, he was also president of the Ahmeek Mining Company, Cliff Mining Company, Isle Royale Copper Company, Osceolo Consolidated Mining Co., Seneca Mining Co., and Tamarack Mining Company and vice president of the Allouez Mining, Centennial Copper Mining Co., Frontenac Copper Co., Gratiot Mining Co., La Salle Copper Co., Laurium Mining Co., Manitou Mining Co., Superior Copper Co. Even as his health declined in 1933, he continued to make weekly business trips to New York City and biannual trips to Michigan to oversee Calumet and Hecla.

He was vice president of the Massachusetts Hospital Insurance Company and a director of the First National Bank of Boston, the Edison Electric Illuminating Company, the Old Colony Trust Company, Walter Baker & Co, and Wonderland Amusement Park.

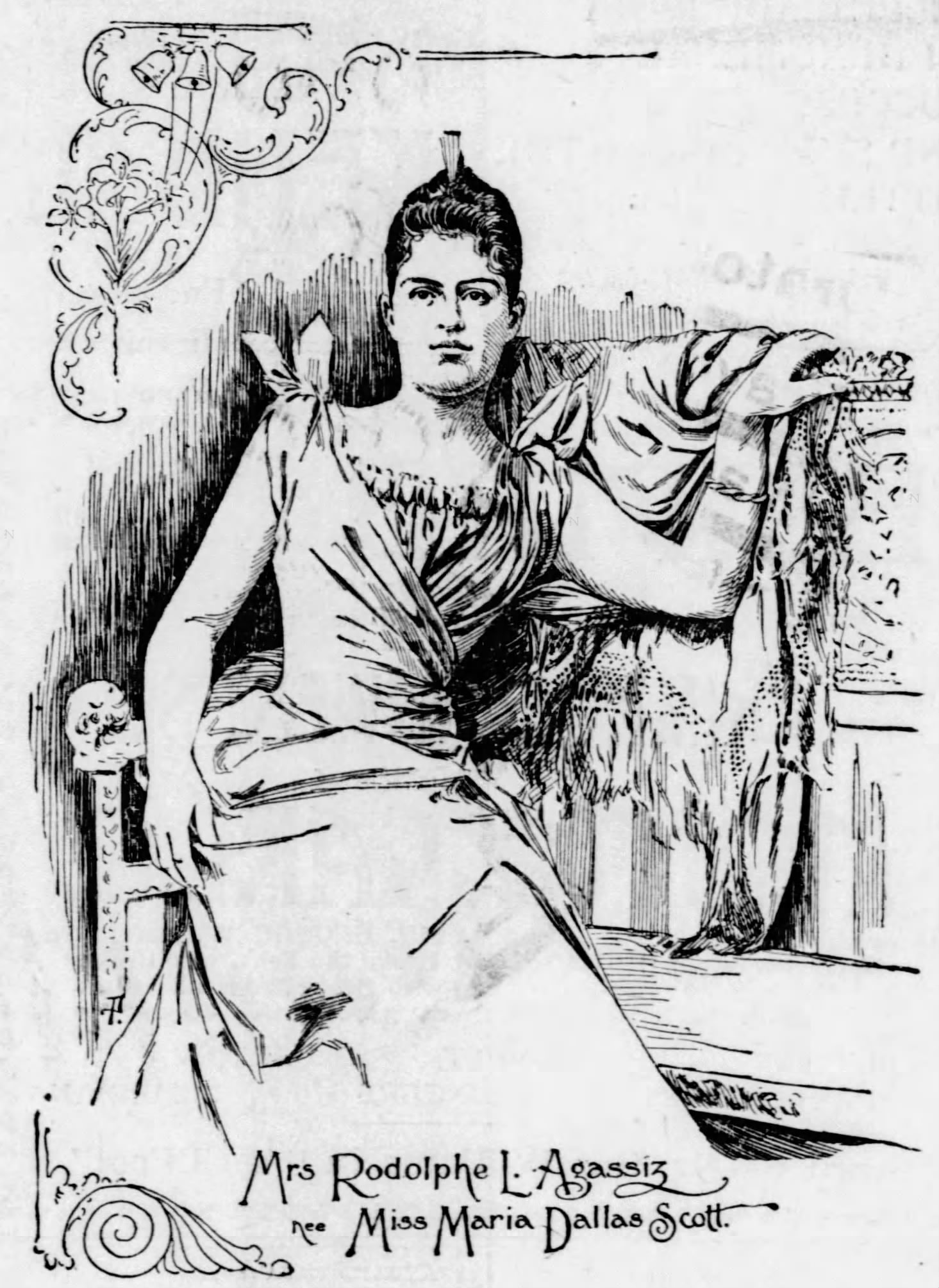
Maria Dallas Scott Agassiz in 1894

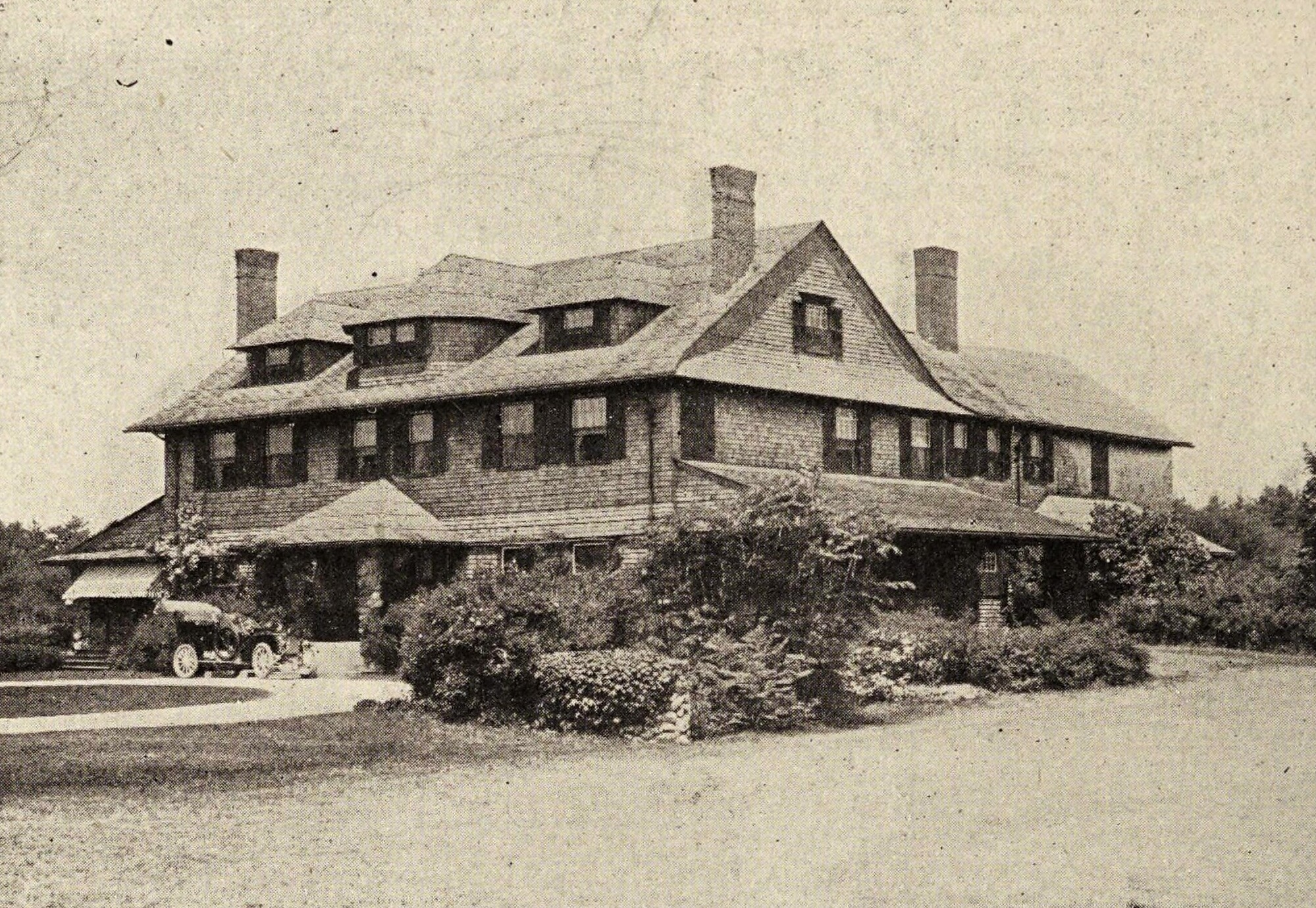
"Homewood"

== Personal life ==
Agassiz married Maria Dallas Scott on March 27, 1894 in Philadelphia, Pennsylvania. They had one daughter, Maria Dallas Agassiz. They lived on Beacon Street in Boston, Massachusetts.

In December 1896, Agassiz purchased the Fosse estate ''The Kennels" in Hamilton, which included 100 acres. They built a new country house on the property, "Homewood", designed by Peabody and Stearns. They spent their summers in Newport, Rhode Island where they were social leaders.

Agassiz was a member of the Republican Party most of his life, but left the party in 1928 over the issue of prohibition. His public statement about leaving the Republican Party received national publicity. He was a director of the Constitutional Liberty League and supported Governor Al Smith, who was against prohibition.

Agassiz was a clubman and a leader of the social life in Boston. He belonged to the Chicago Club, the Harvard Club of Boston, the Knickerbocker Club, the Links Club, and the Somerset Club. He also belonged to The Country Club, the Eastern Yacht Club, the Essex Country Club, the Myopia Hunt Club, and the Tennis and Racquet Club. He served on the committee of management of the Point Judith Country Club. He frequently hunted and fished in Montana and Canada.

In 1929, Agassiz moved to a new house in Prides Crossing, Beverly, Massachusetts. He became ill in May 1933. Agassiz died on July 31, 1933, at his summer home in Prides Crossing.
