= Alexander Agassiz =

American scientist and engineer (1835–1910)

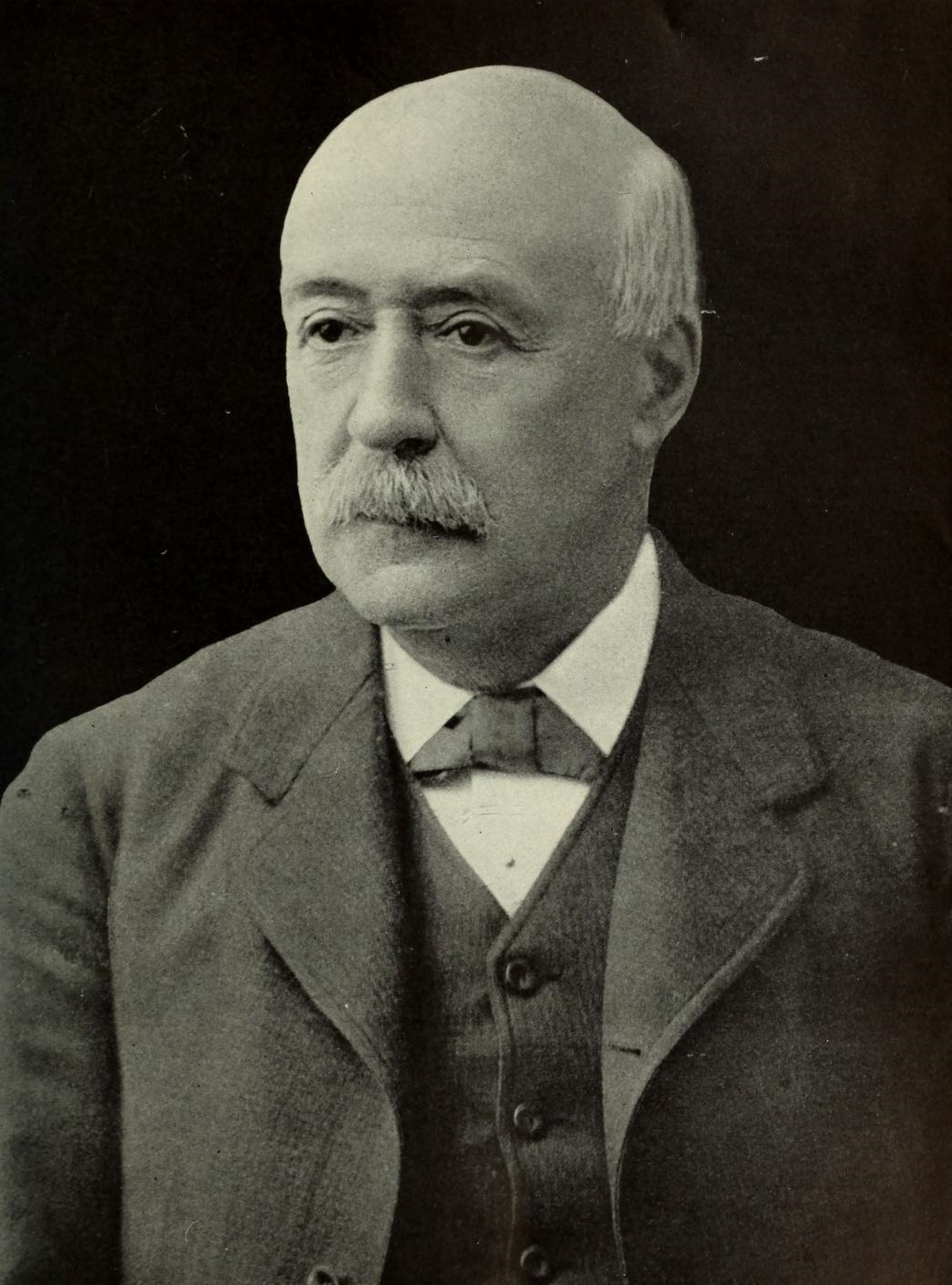
- Born: Alexander Emmanuel Rodolphe Agassiz; December 17, 1835; Neuchâtel, Switzerland
- Died: March 27, 1910 (aged 74); North Atlantic Ocean (aboard the RMS Adriatic)
- Education: Harvard University (AB, BS)
- Children: 3, including Rodolphe Louis Agassiz
- Father: Louis Agassiz
- Scientific career
- Author abbrev. (zoology): A.Agassiz, A.Ag.

Alexander Emmanuel Rodolphe Agassiz (December 17, 1835 – March 27, 1910), was an American scientist and engineer. He was the son of Louis Agassiz and stepson of Elizabeth Cabot Agassiz.

== Biography ==
Agassiz was born in Neuchâtel, Switzerland, and immigrated to the United States in 1849, joining his father Louis Agassiz, after his mother Cecile (Braun) Agassiz died in 1848. Thereupon, his father enrolled him in the Cambridge High School, before entering Harvard at the age of 15. He graduated from Harvard University in 1855, subsequently studying engineering and chemistry, and taking the degree of Bachelor of Science at the Lawrence Scientific School of the same institution in 1857; in 1859 became an assistant in the United States Coast Survey, onboard the Fauntleroy. In 1860, he became an agent for the Museum of Comparative Zoology, and married Anna Russell. Thenceforward he became a specialist in marine ichthyology. Agassiz was elected a Fellow of the American Academy of Arts and Sciences in 1862. Up until the summer of 1866, Agassiz worked as assistant curator in the museum of natural history that his father founded at Harvard.

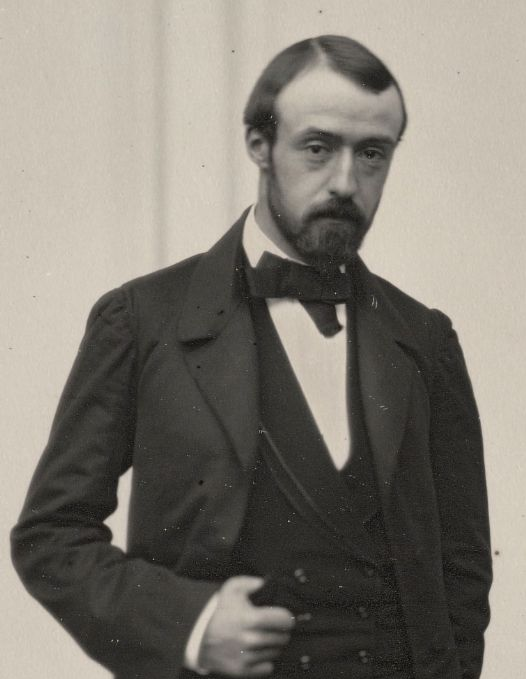
Agassiz c. 1860

E. J. Hulbert persuaded Agassiz's brother-in-law, Quincy Adams Shaw, and friends to invest in a rich copper lode discovered on Michigan's Keweenaw Peninsula, called the Calumet Mine. In 1866, Agassiz visited the outcrop and noted that the Calumet Conglomerate was a porphyry almost fourteen feet wide, dipping to the northwest at a 35 degree angle. The rich nature of the deposit convinced Shaw to purchase the land to the south, forming the Hecla Mining Company. Agassiz was then made treasurer of both companies. Disappointed in Hulbert's management of the Calumet, Agassiz replaced Hulbert with a new manager called Davis in December. Agassiz states, "I have put in every cent of mine into these two mines." Convinced the deposit could be developed at a profit, Agassiz was made superintendent of both mines, and arrived on site in March 1867. Upon arrival, Agassiz noted that Hulbert earlier that year was "...concealing the true nature of things and making estimates out of all proportion with what he must have known the expenses to be." One of the first projects Agassiz undertook was to change the openings of both mines so "the rock could be extracted with legitimate mining methods." With further investment from John Simpkins, improvements were made to the mills and almost 5 miles of railroad. In July, Agassiz's family joined him. By September 1868, Hecla was producing 185 tons of ingot, the Calumet 140, and both mills stamping 4000 tons of rock per month. Agassiz was able to place George Hardie in charge, and returned to Cambridge in October. Agassiz continued to visit the mines every spring and fall.

In December 1869, the Hecla paid its first dividend, and the Calumet did so in August 1870. In May 1871, the Calumet and Hecla Mining Company was formed after consolidating with the Portland and Scott Mining Companies. Shaw was the first president, but soon retired to the board of directors, when Agassiz assumed the presidency until his death.

In 1883, Agassiz innovated by installing a giant engine, known as the Superior, which was able to lift 24 tons of rock from a depth of 1,200 metres (3,900 feet). He also built a railroad and dredged a channel to navigable waters. With Erasmus Darwin Leavitt Jr. employed as his mechanical engineer, Agassiz installed state of the art hoisting engines. Out of his copper fortune, he gave some US$500,000 to Harvard for the museum of comparative zoology and other purposes.

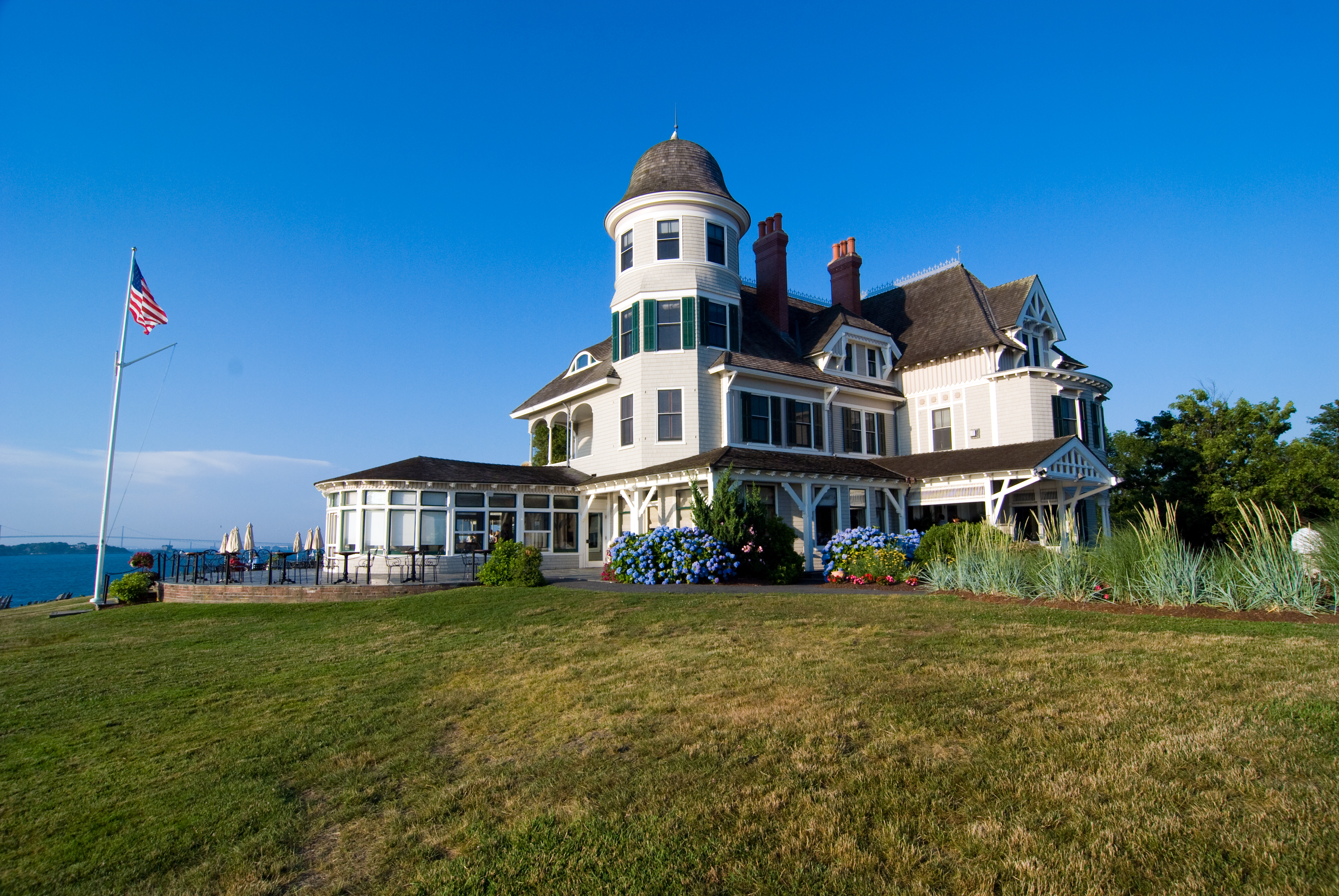
Castle Hill Inn, Agassiz's Newport cottage

In 1875, Agassiz built a marine laboratory on his summer estate located at Castle Hill, Newport, Rhode Island, hoping to carry on the work his father started at Penikese Island. In 1877, Agassiz opened the Newport Marine Zoological Laboratory. Agassiz hosted grad students there until 1897, and continued to use the lab until his death.

He was a member of the scientific-expedition to South America in 1875, where he inspected the copper mines of Peru and Chile, and made extended surveys of Lake Titicaca, besides collecting invaluable Peruvian antiquities, which he gave to the Museum of Comparative Zoology (MCZ), of which he was first curator from 1874 to 1885 and then director until his death in 1910, his personal secretary Elizabeth Hodges Clark running the day-to-day management of the MCZ when his work took him abroad. He assisted Charles Wyville Thomson in the examination and classification of the collections of the 1872 Challenger Expedition, and wrote the Review of the Echini (2 vols., 1872–1874) in the reports. Between 1877 and 1880, he took part in the three dredging expeditions of the steamer Blake of the Coast Survey (renamed the United States Coast and Geodetic Survey in 1878), and presented a full account of them in two volumes (1888). Also in 1875, he was elected as a member of the American Philosophical Society.

In 1896, Agassiz visited Fiji and Queensland and inspected the Great Barrier Reef, publishing a paper on the subject in 1898.

Of Agassiz's other writings on marine zoology, most are contained in the bulletins and memoirs of the museum of comparative zoology. However, in 1865, he published with Elizabeth Cary Agassiz, his stepmother, Seaside Studies in Natural History, a work at once exact and stimulating. They also published, in 1871, Marine Animals of Massachusetts Bay.

He received the German Order Pour le Mérite for Science and Arts in August 1902. Agassiz also received the Victoria Research Medal, and the Legion of Honour.

Agassiz served as a president of the National Academy of Sciences, which since 1913 has awarded the Alexander Agassiz Medal in his memory. He died in 1910 on board the RMS Adriatic en route to New York from Southampton.

He and his wife Anna Russell (1840–1873) were the parents of three sons – George Russell Agassiz (1861–1951), Maximilian Agassiz (1866–1943) and Rodolphe Louis Agassiz (1871–1933).

== Legacy ==
Alexander Agassiz is commemorated in the scientific name of a species of lizard, Anolis agassizi, and a fish, Leptochilichthys agassizii.

A statue of Alexander Agassiz erected in 1923 is located in Calumet, Michigan, next to his summer home where he stayed while fulfilling his duties as president of the Calumet and Hecla Mining Company. The Company Headquarters, Agassiz' statue, and many other buildings and landmarks from the now defunct company are administered and maintained by the Keweenaw National Historical Park, whose headquarters overlook the statue of Agassiz.

A major building of the Hopkins Marine Station is named after him.

The RV (research vessel) Agassiz is named after him.

== Publications ==
- Agassiz, Alexander (1863). "List of the echinoderms sent to different institutions in exchange for other specimens, with annotations". Bulletin of the Museum of Comparative Zoology 1 (2): 17–28.
- Agassiz, Elizabeth C., and Alexander Agassiz (1865). Seaside Studies in Natural History. Boston: Ticknor and Fields.
- Agassiz, Alexander (1872–1874). "Illustrated Catalogue of the Museum of Comparative Zoology, at Harvard College. No. VII. Revision of the Echini. Parts 1–4". Memoirs of the Museum of Comparative Zoology 3: 1–762. Plates
- Agassiz, Alexander (1877). "North American starfishes". Memoirs of the Museum of Comparative Zoology 5 (1): 1–136.
- Agassiz, Alexander (1881). "Report on the Echinoidea dredged by H.M.S. Challenger during the years 1873–1876". Report of the Scientific Results of the Voyage of H.M.S. Challenger During the Years 1873–76. Zoology. 9: 1–321.
- Agassiz, Alexander (1903). "Three cruises of the United States Coast and Geodetic Survey steamer 'Blake' in the Gulf of Mexico, in the Caribbean Sea, and along the Atlantic coast of the United States, from 1877 to 1880. Vol I". Bulletin of the Museum of Comparative Zoology 14: 1–314.
- Agassiz, Alexander (1903). "Three cruises of the United States Coast and Geodetic Survey steamer 'Blake' in the Gulf of Mexico, in the Caribbean Sea, and along the Atlantic coast of the United States, from 1877 to 1880. Vol II". Bulletin of the Museum of Comparative Zoology 15: 1–220.
- Agassiz, Alexander (1903). "The coral reefs of the tropical Pacific". Memoirs of the Museum of Comparative Zoology 28: 1–410. Plates I. Plates II. Plates III.
- Agassiz, Alexander (1903). "The coral reefs of the Maldives". Memoirs of the Museum of Comparative Zoology 29: 1–168.
- Agassiz, Alexander (1904). "The Panamic deep sea Echini". Memoirs of the Museum of Comparative Zoology 31: 1–243. Plates.

== See also ==
- Agassiz family
