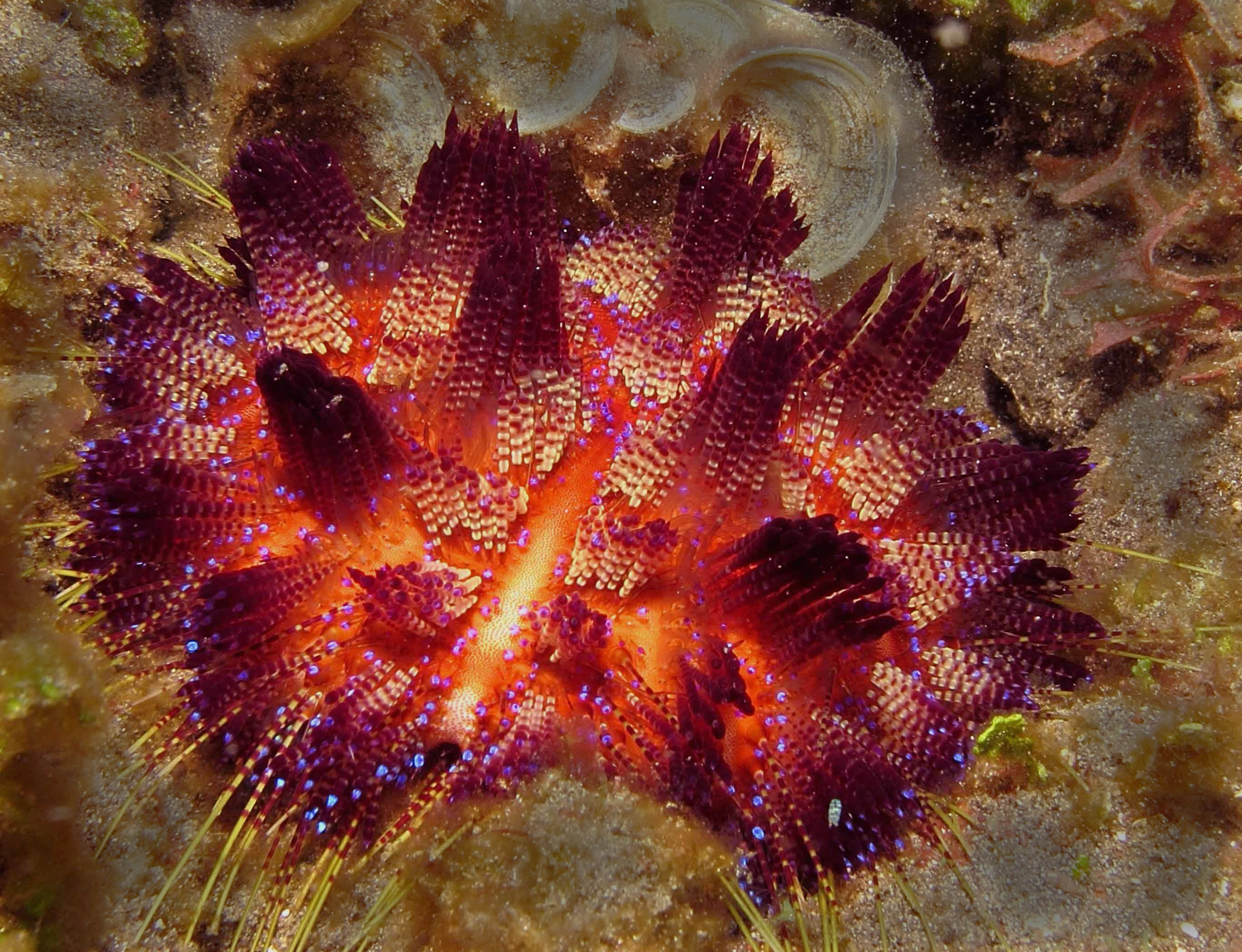
- Fire urchin (Asthenosoma varium)

Scientific classification
- Kingdom: Animalia
- Phylum: Echinodermata
- Class: Echinoidea
- Subclass: Euechinoidea
- Infraclass: Aulodonta
- Superorder: Echinothuriacea
- Order: Echinothurioida; Claus, 1880

Families
- See text

= Echinothurioida =

Echinothurioida Temporal range: Middle Jurassic–Recent

Order of sea urchins

The Echinothurioida are an order of sea urchins in the class Echinoidea. Echinothurioids are distinguished from other sea urchins by the combination of a flexible test and hollow spines. The membrane around the mouth contains only simple plates, in contrast to the more complex mouth parts of their close relatives, the Diadematoida. They are nearly all deepsea dwellers.

== Characteristics ==
Echinothurioids have regular tests (shells) with 10 columns of plates. These plates are fused in groups of three with a central primary plate and a half plate on either side. The edge of each group of plates overlaps the next one in the manner of tiles on a roof and this means the test is flexible. These animals usually collapse to a disc shape when brought to the surface. The primary tubercles which articulate with the spines are each perforated by a hole and the spines are hollow. The primary spines are usually long and are used to support the test and in locomotion. In many species, the secondary spines are tipped with poison glands and the urchins should only be handled with gloves. The fused plates continue to the edge of the jaws, covering the peristome membrane that surrounds the mouth. The mouthparts, known as the Aristotle's lantern, have simple plates and grooved teeth. The gills are relatively small, and in many species, entirely absent.

== Biology ==
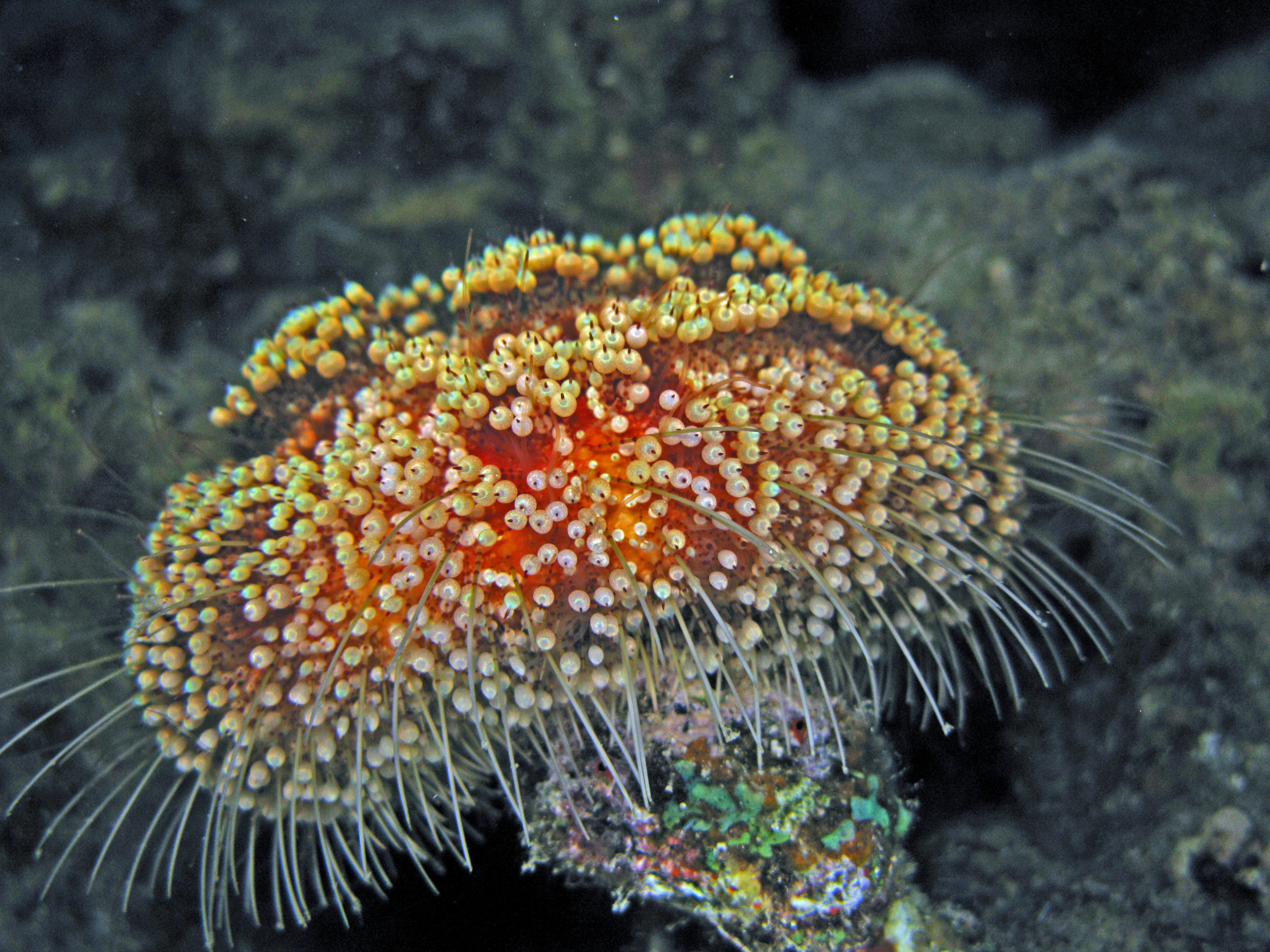
Toxic leather sea urchin (Asthenosoma marisrubri)

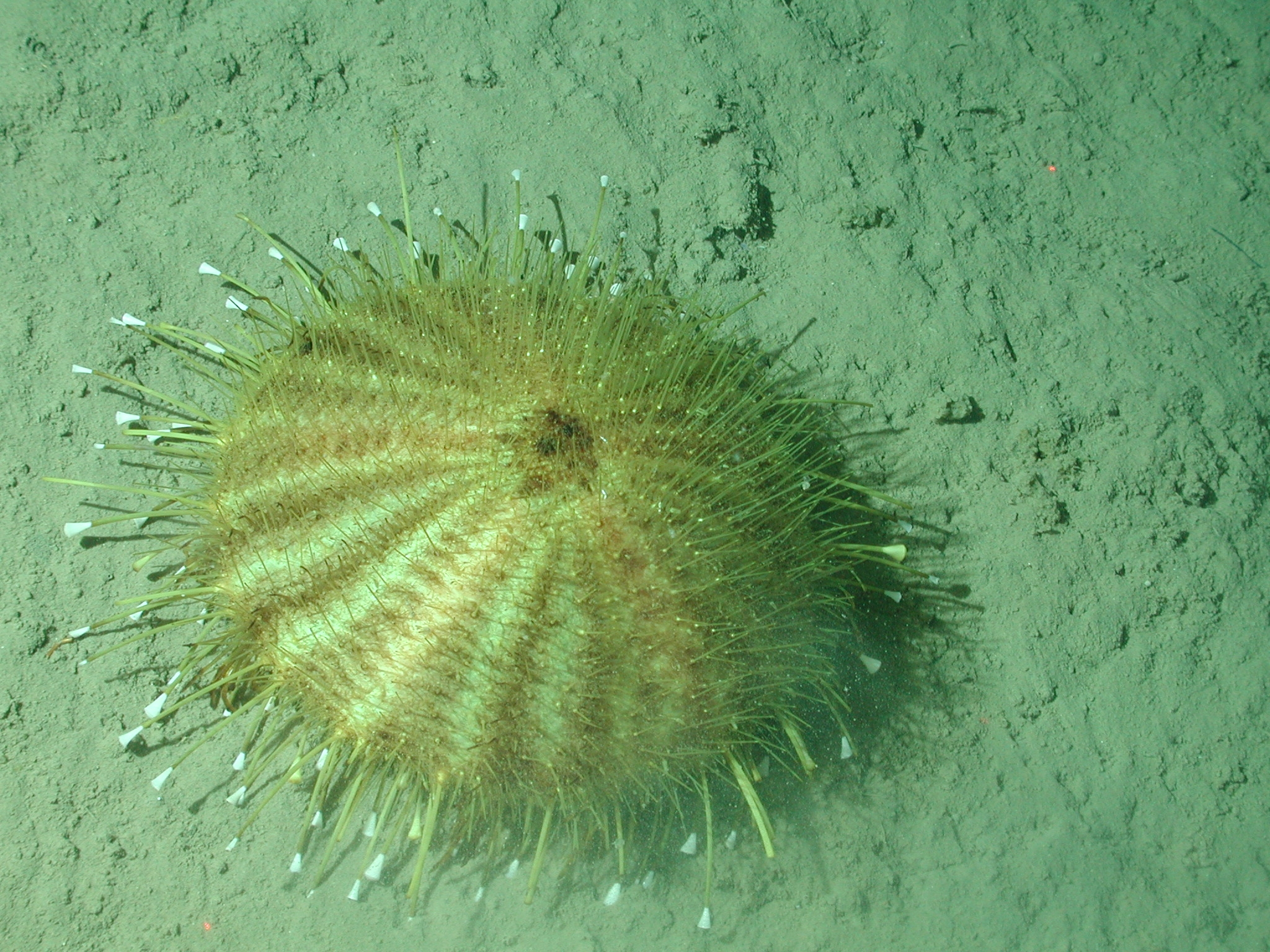
Gold sea urchin (Tromikosoma sp.) at 2,932 metres (9,619 ft)

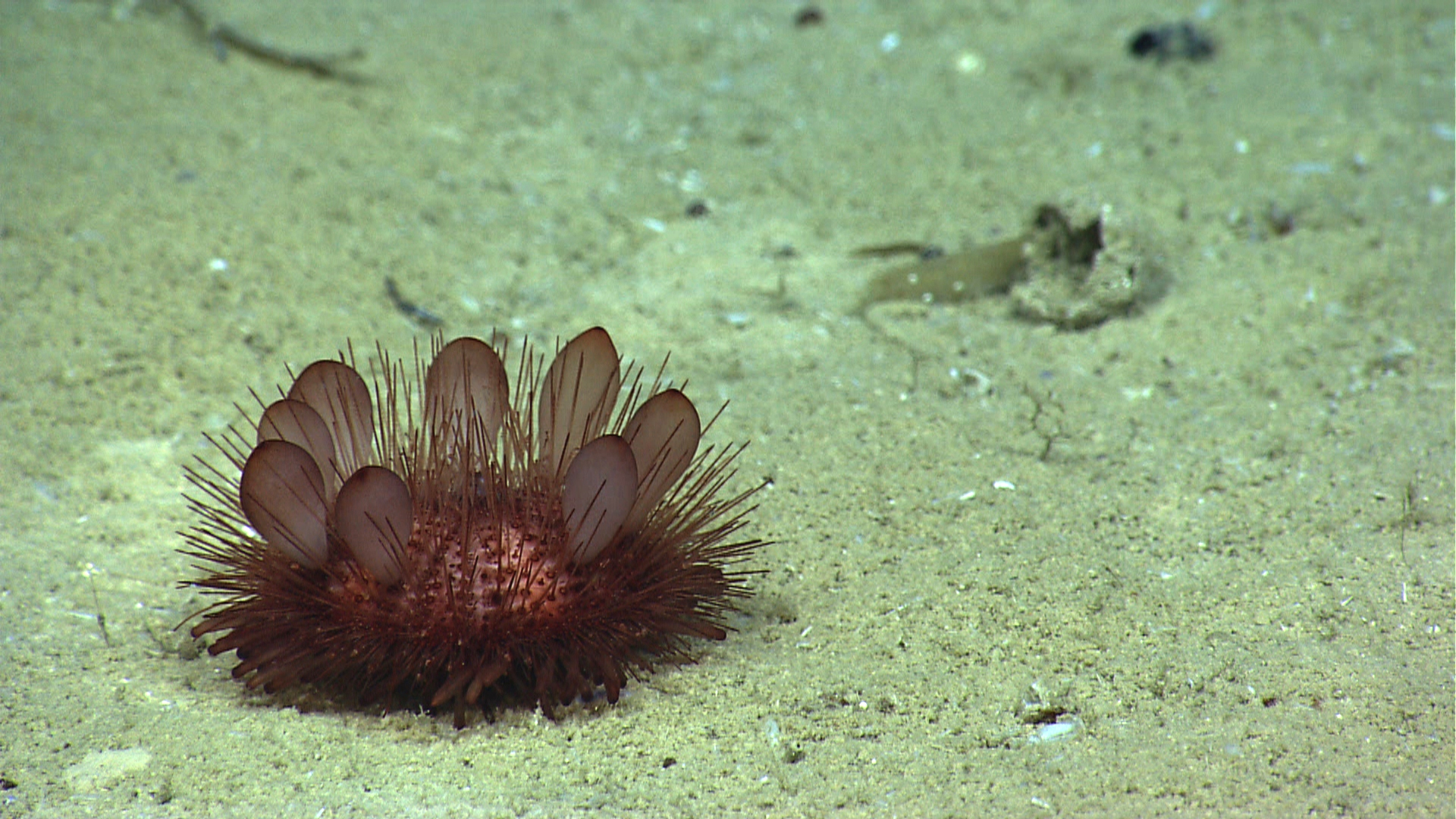
Phormosoma placenta

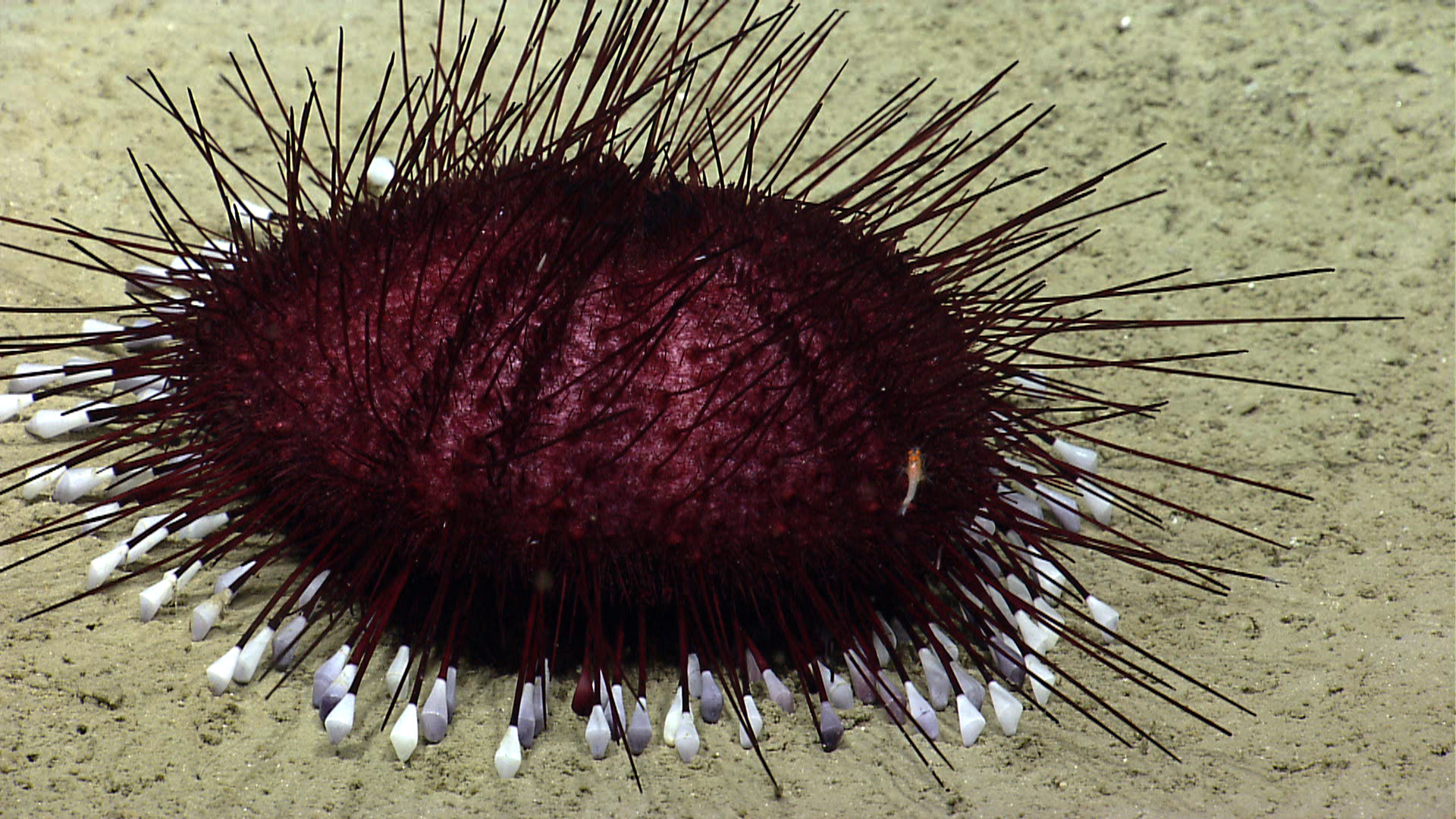
Hygrosoma sp.

Echinothurioids are nearly all found on the seabed at abyssal depths, but by way of an exception, Asthenosoma ijimai is found in shallow water. Because of the difficulty in studying these echinothurioids at such depths, little is known of their feeding habits, but examination of their stomach contents suggests they eat detritus, mostly in the form of algal fragments. Their reproduction is also relatively unstudied, but some members of the group, such as Phormosoma placenta, produce eggs with large yolks which at first rise towards the surface and later sink again. The bilaterally symmetrical larva, called an echinopluteus, is planktonic and may not feed, relying on its yolk for nourishment before descending to the seabed and undergoing metamorphosis.

== Evolutionary history ==
For many years, echinothurioids were believed to be extinct, being only known from fossils. Their fossils are rare because the test tends to disintegrate after the echinoderm dies, and the only parts to be preserved are detached plates and spines. The earliest known echinothurioid was Pelanechinus, dating back to the Middle to Late Jurassic. It had a more fused test than more recent species and was better preserved. It bridges the gap between the echinothurioids and the diadematoids. The earliest crown group example was Echinothuria, which came from the Upper Cretaceous of southern England. Living members of the group were found after the Challenger expedition of 1872–1876 began to explore the deep sea.

== Taxonomy ==
The World Echinoidea Database recognises these families and genera:

- Family Echinothuriidae Thomson, 1872a
  - Genus Araeosoma Mortensen, 1903b
  - Genus Asthenosoma Grube, 1868
  - Genus Calveriosoma Mortensen, 1934
  - Genus Echinothuria Woodward, 1863 †
  - Genus Hapalosoma Mortensen, 1903b
  - Genus Hygrosoma Mortensen, 1903b
  - Genus Retzneiosoma Kroh, 2005 †
  - Genus Sperosoma Koehler, 1897
  - Genus Tromikosoma Mortensen, 1903
- Family Kamptosomatidae Mortensen, 1934
  - Genus Kamptosoma Mortensen, 1903b
- Family Phormosomatidae Mortensen, 1934
  - Genus Hemiphormosoma Mortensen, 1934
  - Genus Paraphormosoma Mortensen, 1934
  - Genus Phormosoma Thomson, 1872b
- Family Pelanechinidae Groom, 1887 †
  - Genus Pelanechinus †

"†" means an extinct taxon

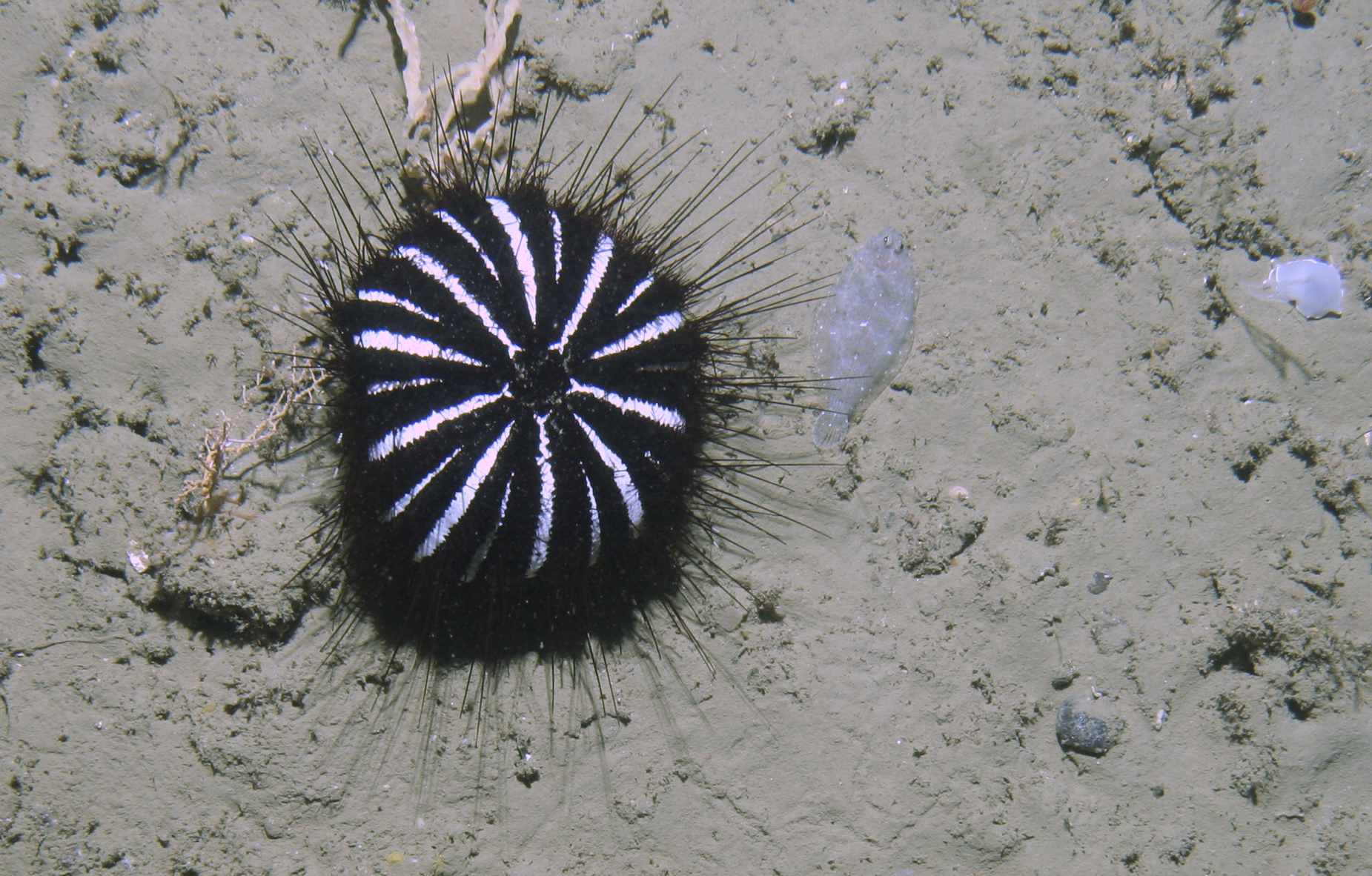
Araeosoma thetidis

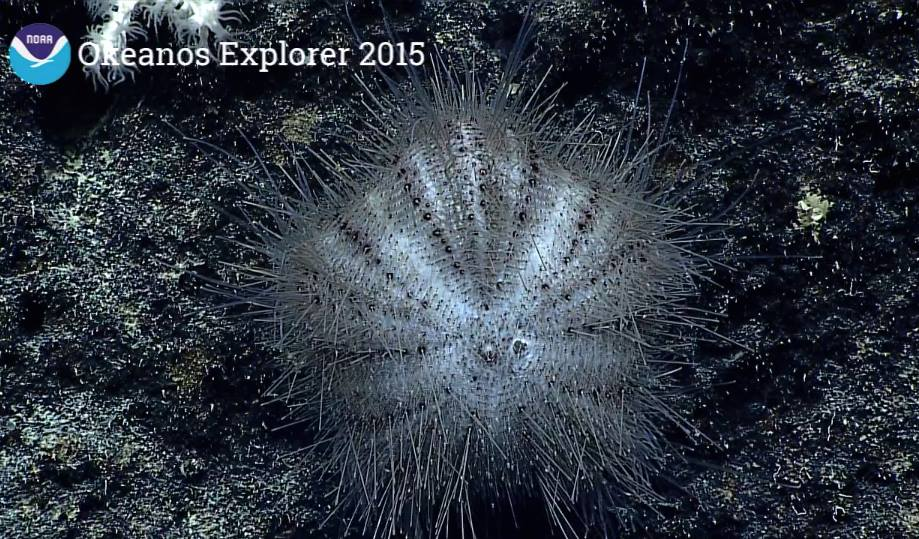
Sperosoma sp.
