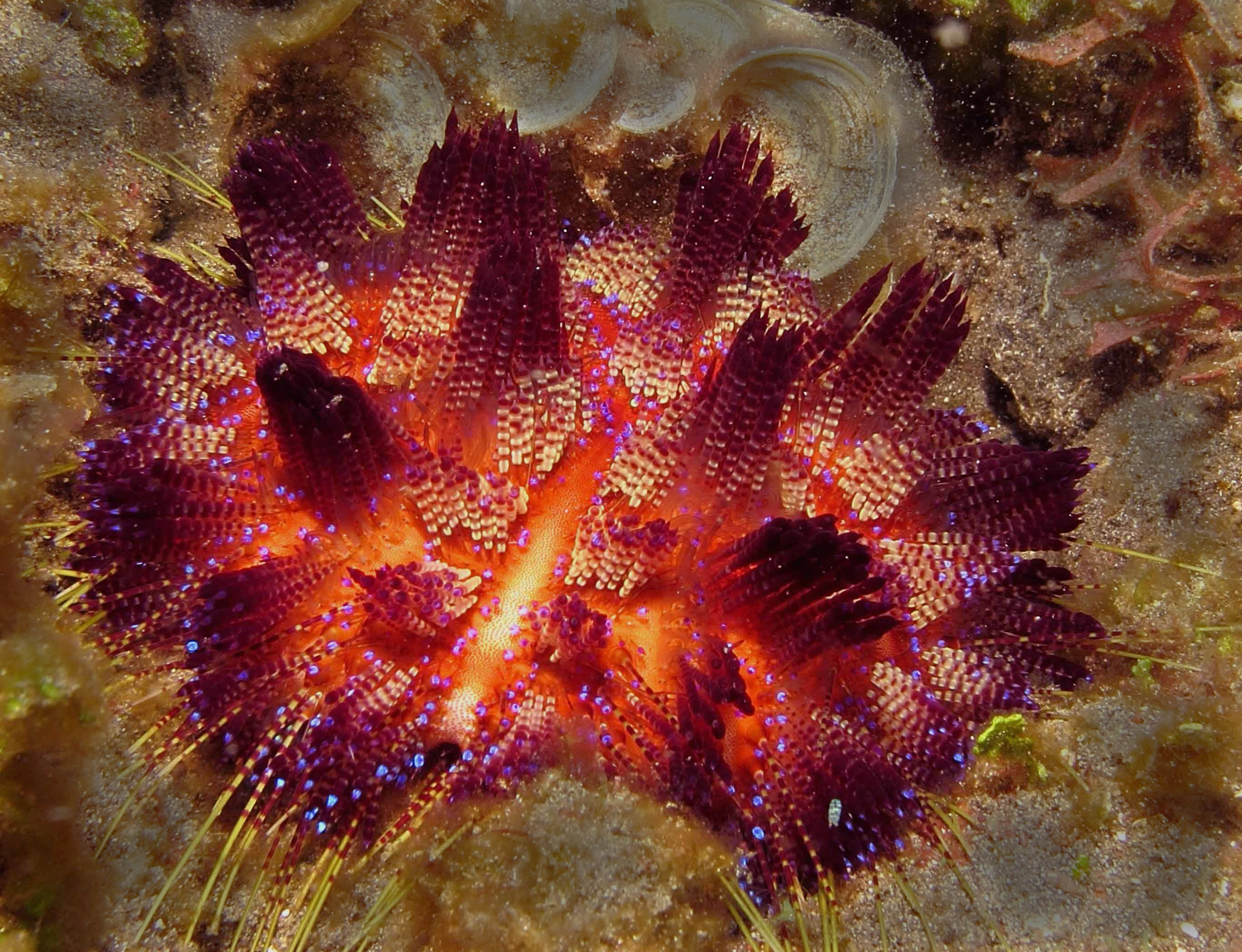
- Fire urchin (Asthenosoma varium)

Scientific classification
- Kingdom: Animalia
- Phylum: Echinodermata
- Class: Echinoidea
- Order: Echinothurioida
- Family: Echinothuriidae; Thomson, 1872

Genera
- See text

= Echinothuriidae =

Echinothuriidae Temporal range: Cretaceous–Present

Family of sea urchins

The Echinothuriidae are a family of sea urchins in the order Echinothurioida. These echinoderms are typical of the Indo-Pacific these softer-bodied "leather urchins" are found from abyssal to shallow littoral zones in the ocean. While common in the Indo-Pacific these colourful urchins can be found across the world. Some individuals within Echinothuriidae such as species in the genus Asthenosoma are also known as "fire urchins" due to their bright colours and painful, venomous sting.

== Description and characteristics ==
The order to which they belong, Echinothurioida, is defined by compound plates which cover the ambulacra and the peristome. The test is composed of thin and weakly calcified plates, not always continuous. The spines are attached to perforated and uncrenulated tubercles. Spines from the oral face end with a hyaline hoof, which allows walking on soft substrate. The jaw (Aristotle's lantern) has five aulodont teeth.

These sea urchins have a disc-like body, more or less bulging, structured by a flexible test, which is nearly unique among sea urchins. Most species can grow quite big and live in deep seas, though some genera contain shallow species (especially Asthenosoma).

This family, Echinothuriidae seems to have appeared at the end of the Cretaceous.

== Habitat ==
They are most often found in the Indo-Pacific, although they have been observed worldwide, and are among the most common urchins inhabiting deep marine environments. While they are most common at great depths (more than 200m below the surface) the genus Asthenosoma has been known to inhabit shallow zones.

== Interspecies interactions ==
Members of the Echinothuriidae have been observed to attached themselves to living and dead stony corals (Order: Scleractinia) allowing them a degree of protection from crustaceans and fish that feed on urchins. When the threat of predators is low they can be found assembling closely together which likely provides advantages for reproduction and feeding. The levels at which they seek refuge in the coral will also change based on predator presence as the tend to shift higher on the structures in the presence of decapod or crustacean predators, while an increase in fish will lead to an increase in urchins closer to the sediment.

Like other echinoids, members of the Echinothuriidae, namely those belonging to the genus Araeosoma, have been known to prey on or consume the remains of crinoids. Although the extent to which they are capable of successfully hunting the crinoids is unknown, experiments done in captivity present this predator-prey interaction as a definite possibility in nature. Gut contents have been found to also contain pieces of corals, crustacean exoskeleton, bryozoans, polychaetes, foraminifera, sponges, and a variety of other invertebrate elements. The high presence of sediment in the gut along with these elements indicates a scavenger like feeding strategy as they pick up deceased material from the sediment.

== Reproductive biology ==
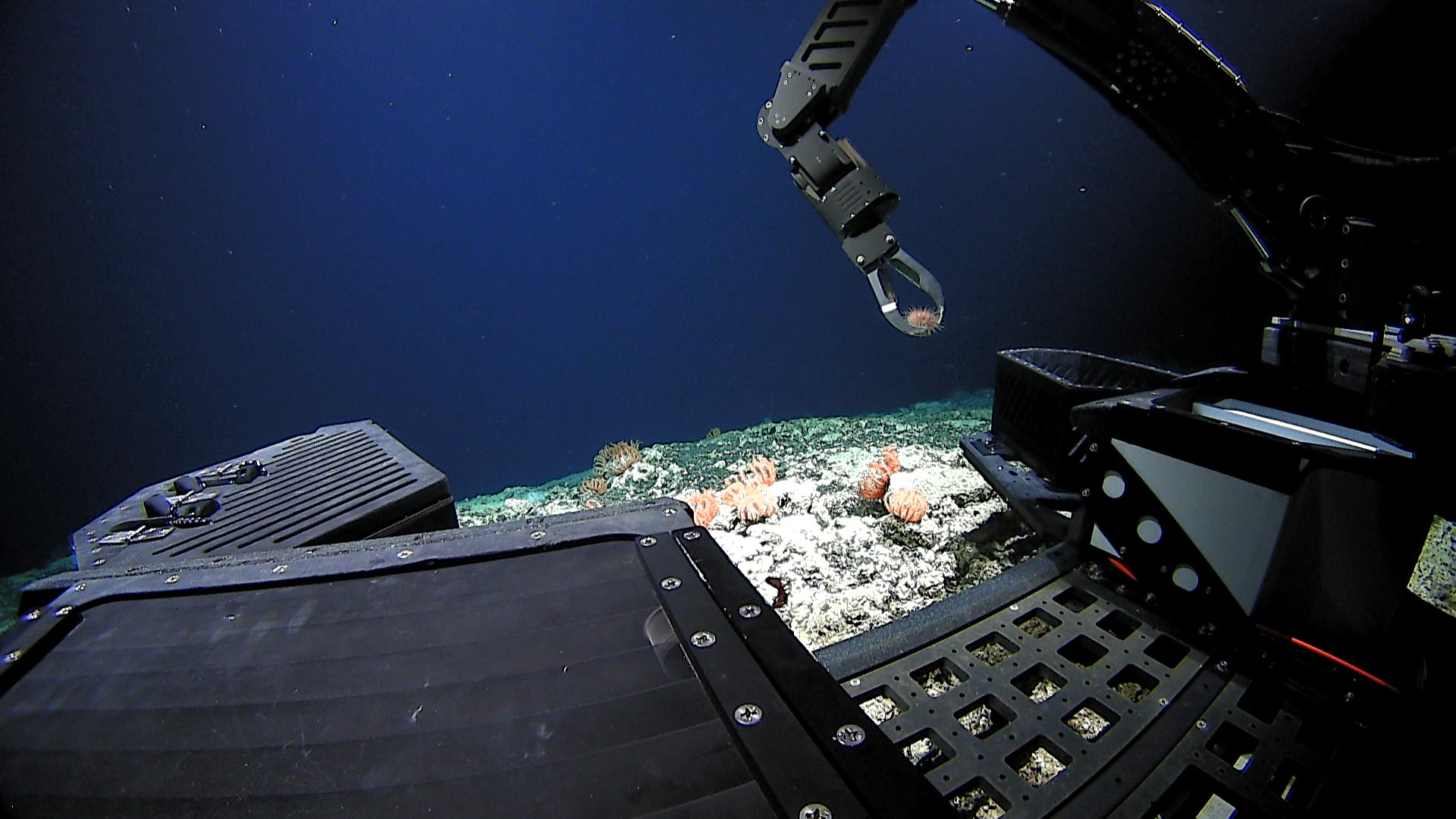
Abyssal echinothuriid collection

Echinothuriidae is separate from other members in their grouping due to having a softer test comparatively. Morphologically they are different but reproductively it is hard to tell visually without investigation. The reproductive habit of echinothuriidae is debated, from pelagic lecithotrophs to direct development, sperm from shallow water echinoid specimens demonstrate a highly conserved morph with minimal variation from species to species. Much of echinothuriidae reproductive biology is restricted to a handful of deep-sea observations of abyssal deep-sea specimens. The deep sea echinothurrid acrosomal vesicles and sperm nuclei are morphologically different from other echinoderm reproductive structures, abyssal echinothuriids showcase far more elongate sperm heads compared to littoral species.

Some members of the family, specifically those belonging to the genus Asthenosoma, produce the largest eggs of any known echinoid. The embryo and larva develop slowly while floating under the water surface. The larvae are completely lecithotrophic, meaning their yolk sustains them for the duration of their growth.

== Taxonomy ==
The World Echinoidea Database recognises these genera:

- Subfamily Echinothuriinae Thomson, 1872a
  - genus Araeosoma Mortensen, 1903b - 19 current species and two fossils
  - genus Asthenosoma Grube, 1868 - six current species and one fossil
  - genus Calveriosoma Mortensen, 1934 - two species
  - genus Hapalosoma Mortensen, 1903b - four species
- Subfamily Hygrosomatinae Smith & Wright, 1990
  - genus Hygrosoma Mortensen, 1903b - three species
- Subfamily Sperosomatinae Smith & Wright, 1990
  - genus Sperosoma Koehler, 1897 - 11 speciesEdit
  - genus Tromikosoma Mortensen, 1903 - six species
- genus Retzneiosoma Kroh, 2005 †

"†" means an extinct taxon.

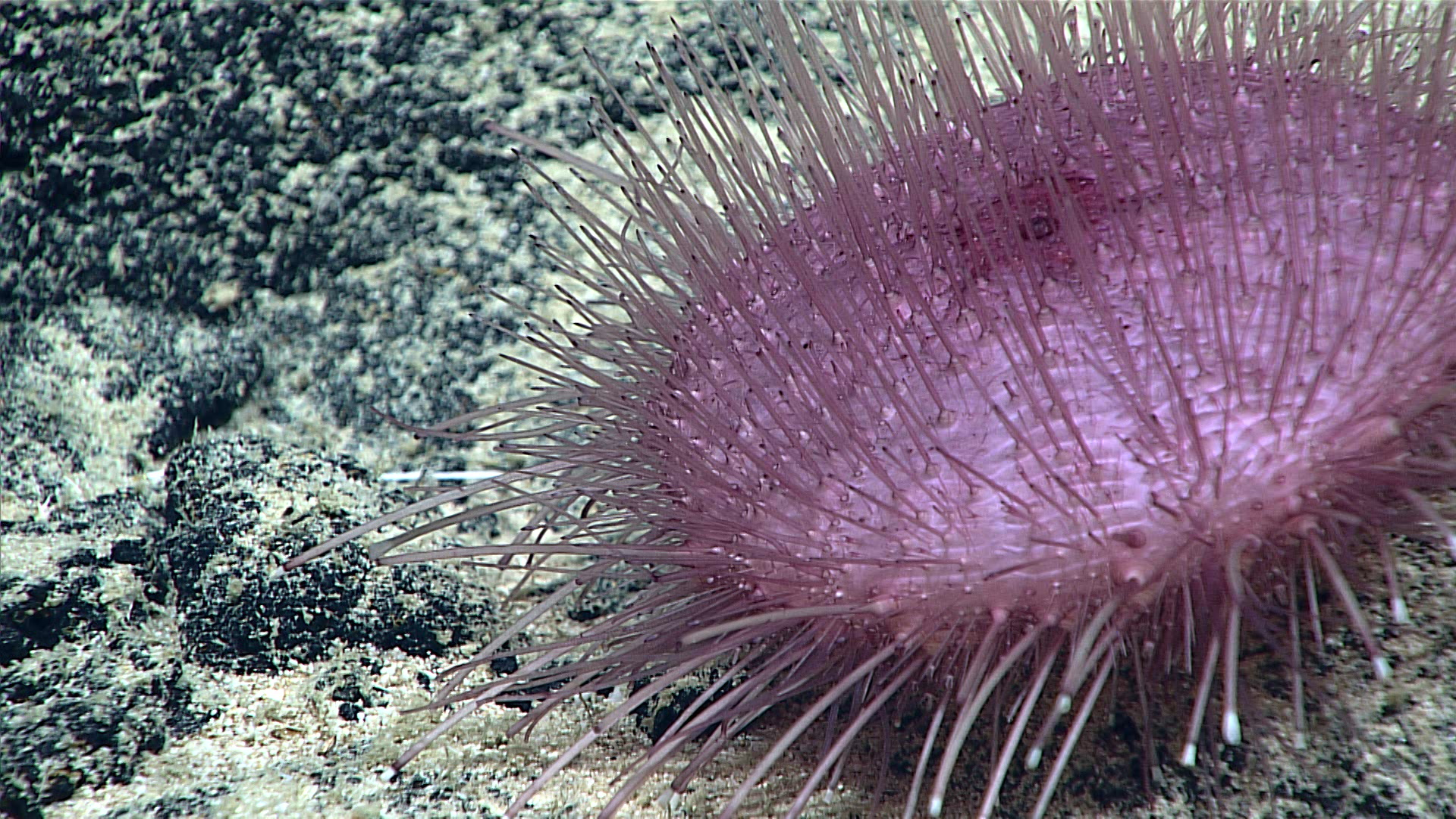
"Purple pancake urchin"

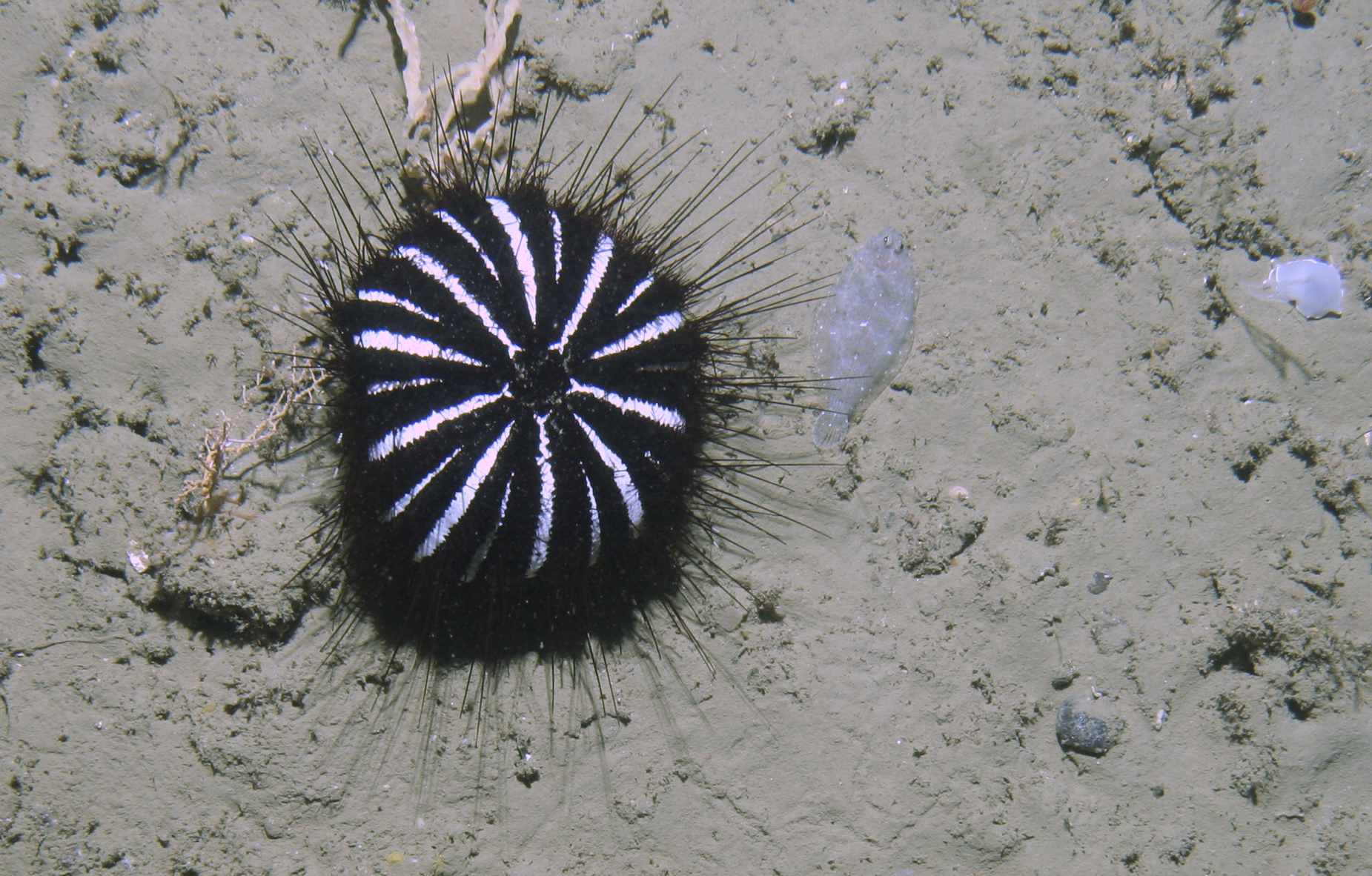
Araeosoma thetidis (New Zealand, 188 m depth)

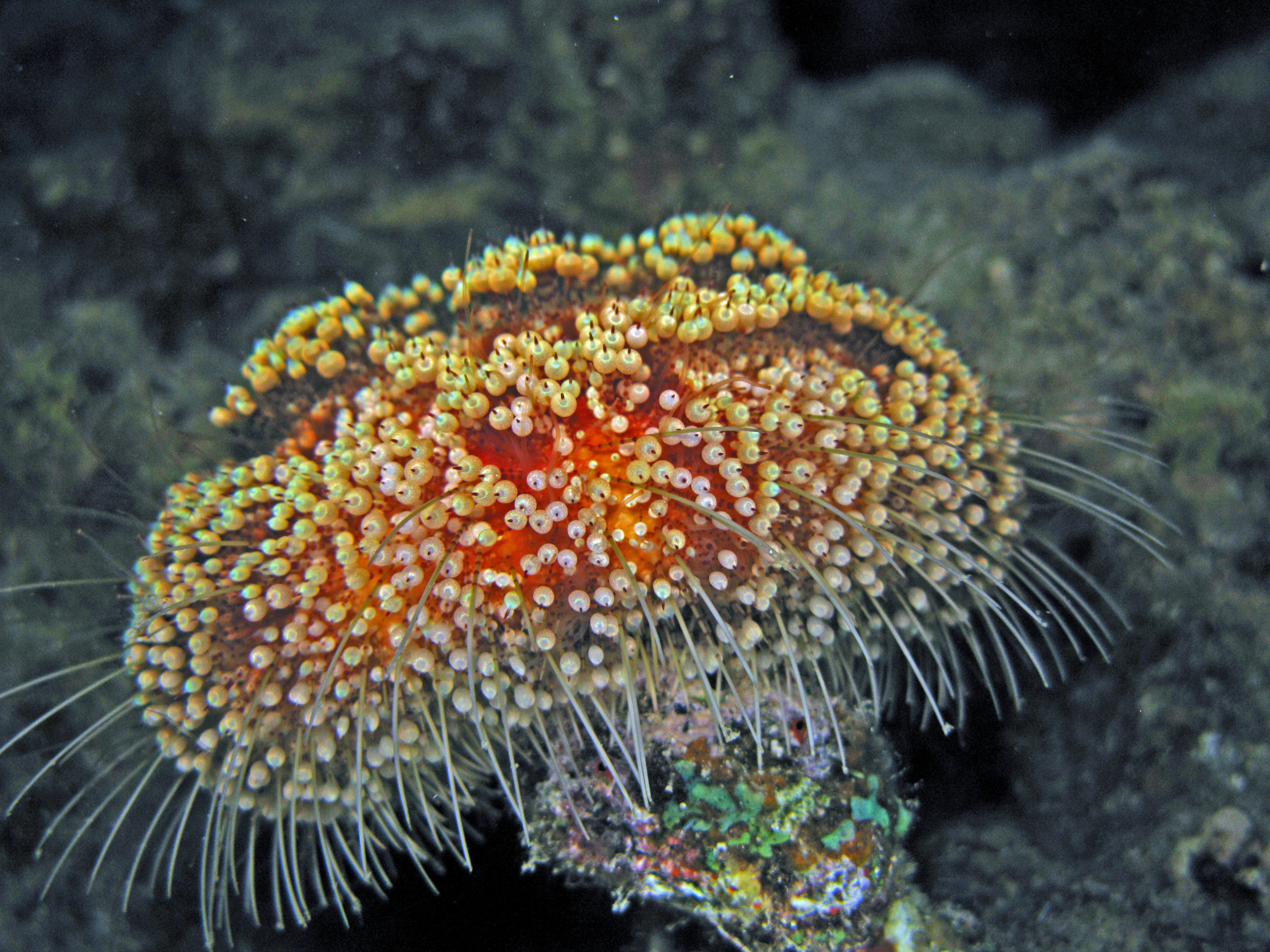
Asthenosoma marisrubri

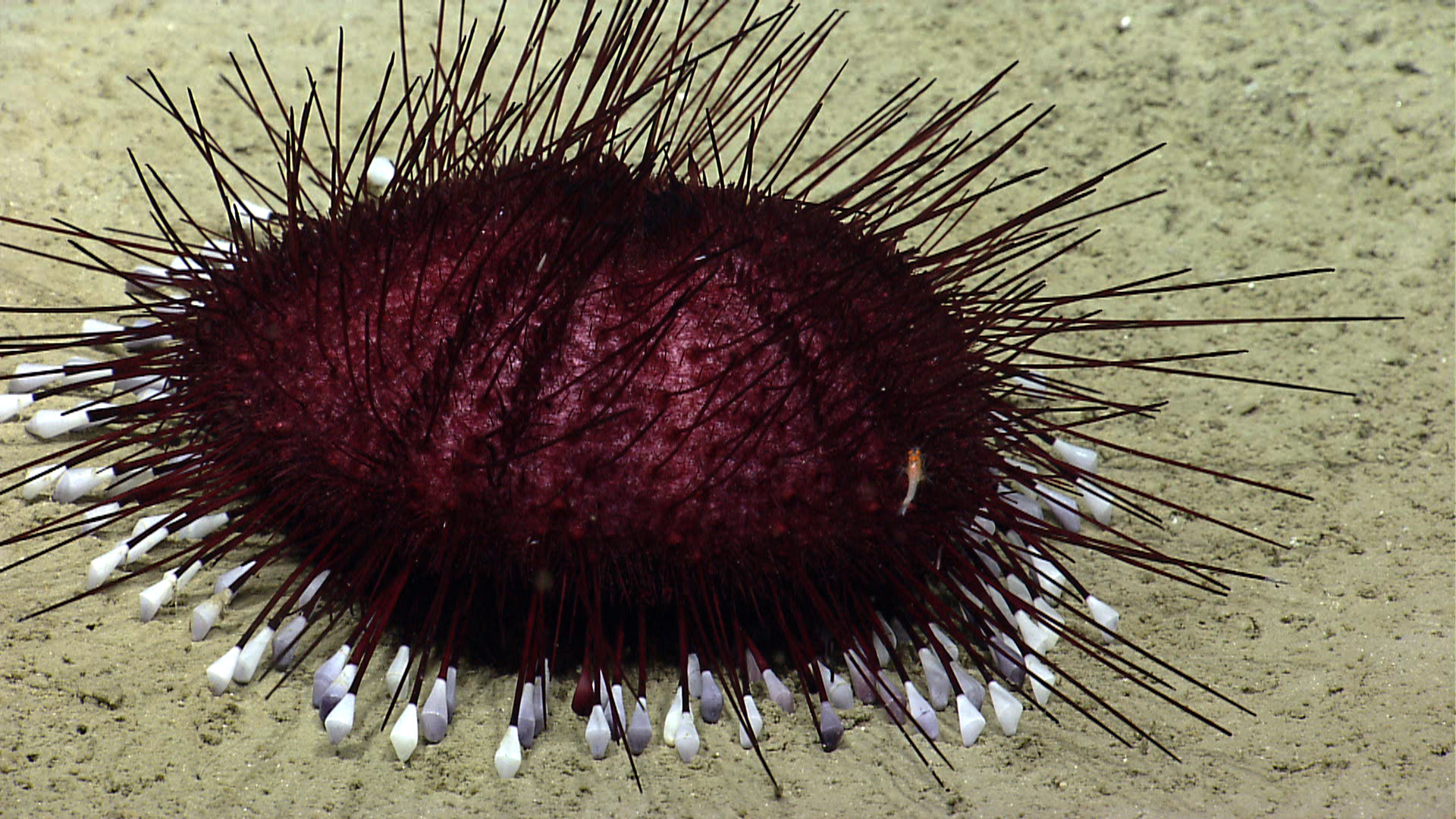
Hygrosoma sp. (abyssal species from north Atlantic)

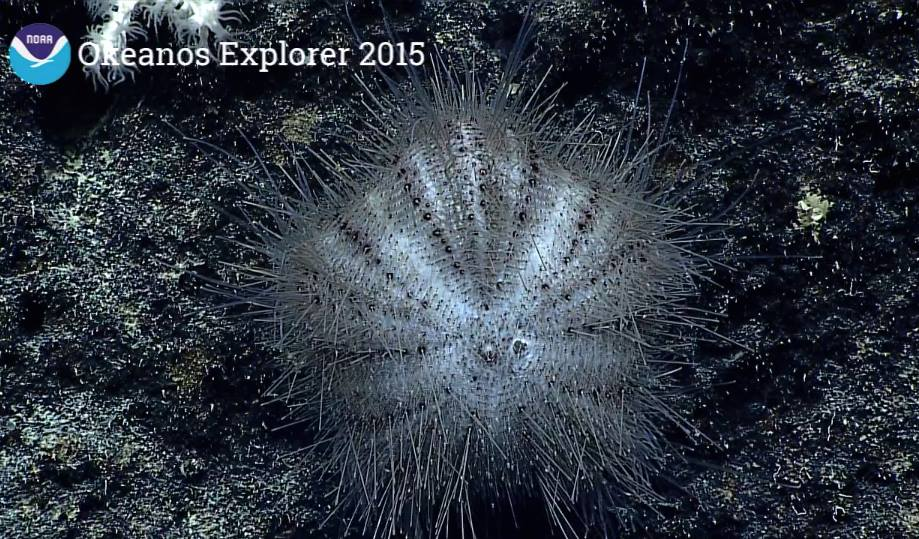
Sperosoma sp. (abyssal species taken in Hawaii)

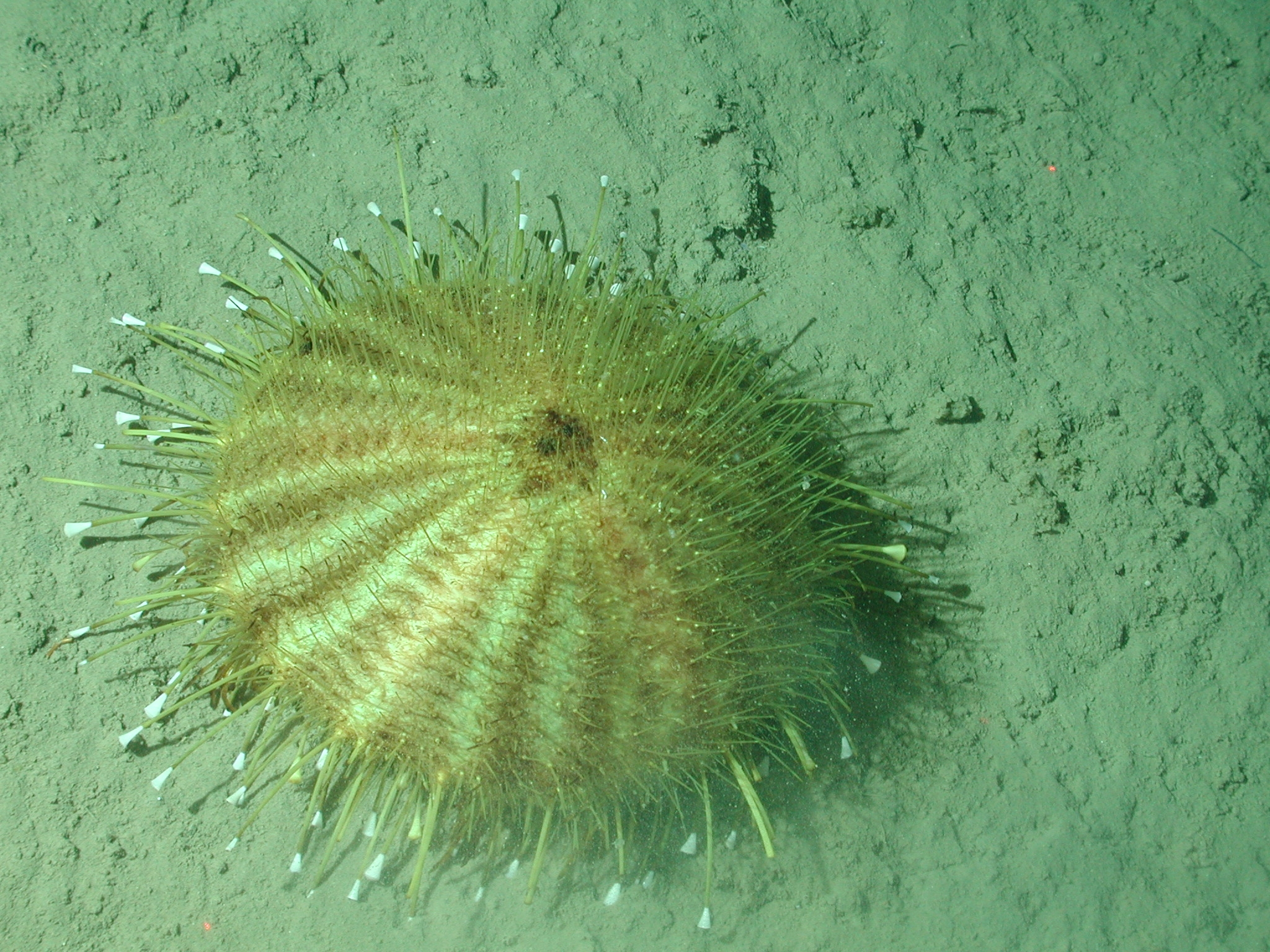
Tromikosoma sp. (3000 m deep, California)
