= March 5 =

March 5 this year in various calendars
- Thursday, 5 March 2026
Akan	Monoyaw
Armenian	18 Areg 1475
Aztec	Tecuilhuitontli 14, 3 Ehēcatl
Babylonian	15 Shabatu, 2336 SE
Balinese pawukon	Luang, Pepet, Kajeng, Laba, Umanis, Maulu, Wraspati of Ugu, Indra, Erangan, Duka
Bengali	20 Falgun, BS 1432
Chinese	Yang Earth Tiger・Horn Mansion; Fire Horse Year, Month 1, Day 17 (Jingzhe, 15 days until Chunfen)
Common Era	5 March 2026 CE
Coptic	26 Meshir, AM 1742
Egyptian	23 Epiphi, 2774 NE
Ethiopian	26 Yakātit, 2018 Amätä Məhrät
French Republican	Décade II, Quintidi de Ventôse de l'Année 234 de la République
Gregorian	5 March, AD 2026
Hebrew	16 Adar, AM 5786
Hindu	Uttaraphalgunī・Śūla; Solar: 21 Phālguna, 1947 SE; Lunisolar: Dvitīyā, Kṛishna pakṣa of Phālguna, 2082 VE; Rāudra・5126 KY・1,872,639
Icelandic	Fimmtudagur, 12 Góa 2025
Islamic	16 Ramadan, AH 1447 (using tabular method)
ISO week date	2026-W10-4
Japanese	17 Mutsuki, Reiwa 8 (Keichitsu, 15 days until Shunbun)
Julian	20 February, AD 2026 (AM 7534)
Julian day	2461105
Korean	17 Horangidal, 4359 DE
Maya	13.0.13.7.2; 0 Cumku, 3 Ik
Roman	ante diem X Kalendas Martias, MMDCCLXXIX AUC
Solar Hijri	14 Esfand, SH 1404
Tibetan	17 mchu, me pho rta 2153 or 1772 or 1000

<<	March					>>
Su	Mo	Tu	We	Th	Fr	Sa
1	2	3	4	5	6	7
8	9	10	11	12	13	14
15	16	17	18	19	20	21
22	23	24	25	26	27	28
29	30	31
2026

March 5 in recent years
2026 (Thursday)
2025 (Wednesday)
2024 (Tuesday)
2023 (Sunday)
2022 (Saturday)
2021 (Friday)
2020 (Thursday)
2019 (Tuesday)
2018 (Monday)
2017 (Sunday)

March 5 is the 64th day of the year (65th in leap years) in the Gregorian calendar; 301 days remain until the end of the year.

== Events ==
=== Pre-1600 ===
- 363 – Roman emperor Julian leaves Antioch with an army of 90,000 to attack the Sasanian Empire, in a campaign which would bring about his own death.
- 1046 – Nasir Khusraw begins the seven-year Middle Eastern journey which he will later describe in his book Safarnama.
- 1279 – The Livonian Order is defeated in the Battle of Aizkraukle by the Grand Duchy of Lithuania.
- 1496 – King Henry VII of England issues letters patent to John Cabot and his sons, authorising them to explore unknown lands.

=== 1601–1900 ===
- 1616 – Nicolaus Copernicus's book On the Revolutions of the Heavenly Spheres is added to the Index of Forbidden Books 73 years after it was first published.
- 1766 – Antonio de Ulloa, the first Spanish governor of Louisiana, arrives in New Orleans.
- 1770 – Boston Massacre: Five Americans, including Crispus Attucks, are fatally shot by British troops in an event that would contribute to the outbreak of the American Revolutionary War (also known as the American War of Independence) five years later.
- 1811 – Peninsular War: A French force under the command of Marshal Victor is routed while trying to prevent an Anglo-Spanish-Portuguese army from lifting the Siege of Cádiz in the Battle of Barrosa.
- 1824 – First Anglo-Burmese War: The British officially declare war on Burma.
- 1825 – Roberto Cofresí, one of the last successful Caribbean pirates, is defeated in combat and captured by authorities.
- 1836 – Samuel Colt establishes his first factory to produce the recently patented production-model revolver, the .34-caliber "Paterson".
- 1850 – The Britannia Bridge across the Menai Strait between the island of Anglesey and the mainland of Wales is opened.
- 1860 – Parma, Tuscany, Modena and Romagna vote in referendums to join the Kingdom of Sardinia.
- 1868 – Mefistofele, an opera by Arrigo Boito, receives its premiere performance at La Scala.
- 1872 – George Westinghouse patents the air brake.

=== 1901–present ===
- 1906 – Moro Rebellion: United States Army troops bring overwhelming force against the native Moros in the First Battle of Bud Dajo, leaving only six survivors.
- 1912 – Italo-Turkish War: Italian forces are the first to use airships for military purposes, employing them for reconnaissance behind Turkish lines.
- 1931 – The British Raj: Gandhi–Irwin Pact is signed.
- 1933 – Adolf Hitler's Nazi Party receives 43.9% at the Reichstag elections, which allows the Nazis to later pass the Enabling Act and establish a dictatorship.
- 1939 – Spanish Civil War: The National Defence Council seizes control of the republican government in a coup d'etat, with the intention of negotiating an end to the war.
- 1940 – Six high-ranking members of the Soviet politburo, including Joseph Stalin, sign an order for the execution of 25,700 Polish intelligentsia, including 14,700 Polish POWs, in what will become known as the Katyn massacre.
- 1942 – World War II: Japanese forces capture Batavia, capital of Dutch East Indies, which is left undefended after the withdrawal of the KNIL garrison and Australian Blackforce battalion to Buitenzorg and Bandung.
- 1943 – World War II: General strike and protest march in Athens against rumours of forced mobilization of Greek workers for work in Germany, resulting in clashes with the Axis occupation forces and collaborationist police. The decree is withdrawn on the next day.
- 1944 – World War II: The Red Army begins the Uman–Botoșani offensive in the western Ukrainian SSR.
- 1946 – Cold War: Winston Churchill delivers his famous "Iron Curtain" speech at Westminster College, Missouri.
- 1953 – Joseph Stalin, the longest serving leader of the Soviet Union, dies at his Volynskoe dacha in Moscow after suffering a cerebral hemorrhage four days earlier.
- 1957 – Sutton Wick air crash: A Blackburn Beverley of 53 Squadron, Royal Air Forces, crashes into the village of Sutton Wick, Berkshire (now Oxfordshire), killing most of the crew and passengers and two local residents.
- 1960 – Indonesian President Sukarno dismisses the Dewan Perwakilan Rakyat (DPR), 1955 democratically elected parliament, and replaces it with DPR-GR, the parliament of his own selected members.
- 1963 – American country music stars Patsy Cline, Hawkshaw Hawkins, Cowboy Copas and their pilot Randy Hughes are killed in a plane crash in Camden, Tennessee.
- 1963 – Aeroflot Flight 191 crashes while landing at Aşgabat International Airport, killing 12.
- 1965 – March Intifada: A Leftist uprising erupts in Bahrain against the British colonial presence.
- 1966 – BOAC Flight 911, a Boeing 707 aircraft, breaks apart in mid-air due to clear-air turbulence and crashes into Mount Fuji, Japan, killing all 124 people on board.
- 1967 – Lake Central Airlines Flight 527 crashes near Marseilles, Ohio, killing 38.
- 1968 – Air France Flight 212 crashes into La Grande Soufrière, killing all 63 aboard.
- 1970 – The Treaty on the Non-Proliferation of Nuclear Weapons goes into effect after ratification by 43 nations.
- 1973 – An Iberia McDonnell Douglas DC-9 collides in mid-air with a Spantax Convair 990 Coronado over Nantes, France, killing all 68 people aboard the DC-9, including music manager Michael Jeffery.
- 1974 – Yom Kippur War: Israeli forces withdraw from the west bank of the Suez Canal.
- 1978 – The Landsat 3 is launched from Vandenberg Air Force Base in California.
- 1979 – Soviet probes Venera 11, Venera 12 and the German-American solar satellite Helios II all are hit by "off the scale" gamma rays leading to the discovery of soft gamma repeaters.
- 1981 – The ZX81, a pioneering British home computer, is launched by Sinclair Research and would go on to sell over 1 1/2 million units around the world.
- 1982 – Soviet probe Venera 14 lands on Venus.
- 1991 – Aeropostal Alas de Venezuela Flight 109 crashes in Venezuela, killing 45.
- 1993 – Palair Macedonian Airlines Flight 301 crashes at Skopje International Airport in Petrovec, North Macedonia, killing 83.
- 2001 – In Mina, Saudi Arabia, 35 pilgrims are killed in a stampede on the Jamaraat Bridge during the Hajj.
- 2002 – An earthquake in Mindanao, Philippines, kills 15 people and injures more than 100.
- 2003 – In Haifa, 17 Israeli civilians are killed in the Haifa bus 37 suicide bombing.
- 2011 – An Antonov An-148 crashes in Russia's Alexeyevsky District, Belgorod Oblast during a test flight, killing all seven aboard.
- 2012 – Tropical Storm Irina kills over 75 as it passes through Madagascar.
- 2012 – Two people are killed and six more are injured in a shooting at a hair salon in Bucharest, Romania.
- 2018 – Syrian civil war: The Syrian Democratic Forces (SDF) pause the Deir ez-Zor campaign due to the Turkish-led invasion of Afrin.
- 2021 – Pope Francis begins a historic visit to Iraq amidst the COVID-19 pandemic.
- 2021 – Twenty people are killed and 30 injured in a suicide car bombing in Mogadishu, Somalia.
- 2023 – The 2023 Estonian parliamentary election is held, with two centre-right liberal parties gaining an absolute majority for the first time.
- 2023 – A group of four prisoners escape from the Nouakchott Civil Prison, before being caught the next day.

== Births ==
=== Pre-1600 ===
- 1133 – Henry II of England (died 1189)
- 1224 – Saint Kinga of Poland (died 1292)
- 1324 – David II of Scotland (died 1371)
- 1326 – Louis I of Hungary (died 1382)
- 1340 – Cansignorio della Scala, Lord of Verona (died 1375)
- 1451 – William Herbert, 2nd Earl of Pembroke, English Earl (died 1491)
- 1512 – Gerardus Mercator, Flemish mathematician, cartographer, and philosopher (died 1594)
- 1523 – Rodrigo de Castro Osorio, Spanish cardinal (died 1600)
- 1527 – Ulrich, Duke of Mecklenburg (died 1603)
- 1539 – Christoph Pezel, German theologian (died 1604)
- 1563 – John Coke, English civil servant and politician (died 1644)
- 1575 – William Oughtred, English minister and mathematician (died 1660)
- 1585 – John George I, Elector of Saxony (died 1656)
- 1585 – Frederick I, Landgrave of Hesse-Homburg (died 1638)

=== 1601–1900 ===
- 1637 – Jan van der Heyden, Dutch painter and engineer (died 1712)
- 1658 – Antoine de la Mothe Cadillac, French explorer and politician, 3rd Colonial Governor of Louisiana (died 1730)
- 1693 – Johann Jakob Wettstein, Swiss theologian and scholar (died 1754)
- 1696 – Giovanni Battista Tiepolo, Italian painter (died 1770)
- 1703 – Vasily Trediakovsky, Russian poet and playwright (died 1768)
- 1713 – Edward Cornwallis, English general and politician, Governor of Gibraltar (died 1776)
- 1713 – Frederick Cornwallis, English archbishop (died 1783)
- 1723 – Princess Mary of Great Britain (died 1773)
- 1733 – Vincenzo Galeotti, Italian-Danish dancer and choreographer (died 1816)
- 1739 – Benjamin Ruggles Woodbridge, American colonel and physician (died 1819)
- 1748 – Jonas Carlsson Dryander, Swedish botanist and biologist (died 1810)
- 1748 – William Shield, English violinist and composer (died 1829)
- 1750 – Jean-Baptiste-Gaspard d'Ansse de Villoison, French scholar and academic (died 1805)
- 1751 – Jan Křtitel Kuchař, Czech organist, composer, and educator (died 1829)
- 1774 – Christoph Ernst Friedrich Weyse, Danish organist and composer (died 1842)
- 1779 – Benjamin Gompertz, English mathematician and statistician (died 1865)
- 1785 – Carlo Odescalchi, Italian cardinal (died 1841)
- 1794 – Jacques Babinet, French physicist, mathematician, and astronomer (died 1872)
- 1794 – Robert Cooper Grier, American lawyer and jurist (died 1870)
- 1800 – Georg Friedrich Daumer, German poet and philosopher (died 1875)
- 1814 – Wilhelm von Giesebrecht, German historian and academic (died 1889)
- 1815 – John Wentworth, American journalist and politician, 19th Mayor of Chicago (died 1888)
- 1817 – Austen Henry Layard, English archaeologist, academic, and politician, Under-Secretary of State for Foreign Affairs (died 1894)
- 1830 – Étienne-Jules Marey, French physiologist and chronophotographer (died 1904)
- 1830 – Charles Wyville Thomson, Scottish historian and zoologist (died 1882)
- 1834 – Félix de Blochausen, Luxembourgian politician, 6th Prime Minister of Luxembourg (died 1915)
- 1834 – Marietta Piccolomini, Italian soprano (died 1899)
- 1853 – Howard Pyle, American author and illustrator (died 1911)
- 1862 – Siegbert Tarrasch, German chess player and theoretician (died 1934)
- 1867 – Louis-Alexandre Taschereau, Canadian lawyer and politician, 14th Premier of Quebec (died 1952)
- 1869 – Michael von Faulhaber, German cardinal (died 1952)
- 1870 – Frank Norris, American journalist and author (died 1902)
- 1870 – Evgeny Paton, French-Ukrainian engineer (died 1953)
- 1871 – Rosa Luxemburg, Polish-Russian economist and philosopher (died 1919)
- 1871 – Konstantinos Pallis, Greek general and politician, Minister Governor-General of Macedonia (died 1941)
- 1873 – Olav Bjaaland, Norwegian skier and explorer (died 1961)
- 1874 – Henry Travers, English-American actor (died 1965)
- 1875 – Harry Lawson, Australian politician, 27th Premier of Victoria (died 1952)
- 1876 – Thomas Inskip, 1st Viscount Caldecote, English lawyer and politician, 8th Lord Chief Justice of England (died 1947)
- 1876 – Elisabeth Moore, American tennis player (died 1959)
- 1879 – William Beveridge, English economist and academic (died 1963)
- 1879 – Andres Larka, Estonian general and politician, 1st Estonian Minister of War (died 1943)
- 1880 – Sergei Natanovich Bernstein, Russian mathematician and academic (died 1968)
- 1882 – Dora Marsden, English author and activist (died 1960)
- 1883 – Pauline Sperry, American mathematician (died 1967)
- 1885 – Marius Barbeau, Canadian ethnographer and academic (died 1969)
- 1886 – Dong Biwu, Chinese judge and politician, Chairman of the People's Republic of China (died 1975)
- 1886 – Freddie Welsh, Welsh boxer (died 1927)
- 1887 – Heitor Villa-Lobos, Brazilian guitarist and composer (died 1959)
- 1894 – Henry Daniell, English-American actor (died 1963)
- 1898 – Zhou Enlai, Chinese politician, 1st Premier of the People's Republic of China (died 1976)
- 1898 – Misao Okawa, Japanese super-centenarian (died 2015)
- 1900 – Lilli Jahn, Jewish German doctor (died 1944)
- 1900 – Johanna Langefeld, German guard and supervisor of three Nazi concentration camps (died 1974)

=== 1901–present ===
- 1901 – Friedrich Günther, Prince of Schwarzburg (died 1971)
- 1901 – Julian Przyboś, Polish poet, essayist and translator (died 1970)
- 1904 – Karl Rahner, German priest and theologian (died 1984)
- 1905 – László Benedek, Hungarian-American director and cinematographer (died 1992)
- 1908 – Fritz Fischer, German historian and author (died 1999)
- 1908 – Irving Fiske, American author and playwright (died 1990)
- 1908 – Rex Harrison, English actor (died 1990)
- 1910 – Momofuku Ando, Taiwanese-Japanese businessman and inventor, founded Nissin Foods (died 2007)
- 1910 – Ennio Flaiano, Italian author, screenwriter, and critic (died 1972)
- 1911 – Subroto Mukerjee, Indian Air Marshall, Father of the Indian Air Force (died 1960)
- 1912 – Jack Marshall, New Zealand colonel, lawyer, and politician, 28th Prime Minister of New Zealand (died 1988)
- 1915 – Henry Hicks, Canadian academic and politician, 16th Premier of Nova Scotia (died 1990)
- 1915 – Laurent Schwartz, French mathematician and academic (died 2002)
- 1917 – Raymond P. Shafer, American attorney and politician, 39th Governor of Pennsylvania (died 2006)
- 1918 – Milt Schmidt, Canadian ice hockey player, coach, and manager (died 2017)
- 1918 – Red Storey, Canadian football player, referee, and sportscaster (died 2006)
- 1918 – James Tobin, American economist and academic (died 2002)
- 1920 – José Aboulker, Algerian surgeon and activist (died 2009)
- 1920 – Virginia Christine, American actress (died 1996)
- 1920 – Rachel Gurney, English actress (died 2001)
- 1920 – Wang Zengqi, Chinese writer (died 1997)
- 1921 – Arthur A. Oliner, American physicist and electrical engineer (died 2013)
- 1921 – Elmer Valo, American baseball player and coach (died 1998)
- 1922 – James Noble, American actor (died 2016)
- 1922 – Pier Paolo Pasolini, Italian actor, director, author, poet and screenwriter (died 1975)
- 1923 – Juan A. Rivero, Puerto Rican biologist and academic (died 2014)
- 1923 – Laurence Tisch, American businessman, co-founded the Loews Corporation (died 2003)
- 1924 – Roger Marche, French footballer (died 1997)
- 1927 – Jack Cassidy, American actor and singer (died 1976)
- 1927 – Robert Lindsay, 29th Earl of Crawford, Scottish businessman and politician (died 2023)
- 1928 – J. Hillis Miller, American academic and critic (died 2021)
- 1929 – Erik Carlsson, Swedish race car driver (died 2015)
- 1929 – J. B. Lenoir, American singer-songwriter and guitarist (died 1967)
- 1930 – John Ashley, Canadian ice hockey player and referee (died 2008)
- 1930 – Del Crandall, American baseball player and manager (died 2021)
- 1931 – Fred, French author and illustrator (died 2013)
- 1931 – Barry Tuckwell, Australian horn player and educator (died 2020)
- 1932 – Paul Sand, American actor
- 1933 – Walter Kasper, German cardinal and theologian
- 1934 – Daniel Kahneman, Israeli-American economist and psychologist, Nobel Prize laureate (died 2024)
- 1934 – James B. Sikking, American actor (died 2024)
- 1935 – Letizia Battaglia, Italian photographer and journalist (died 2022)
- 1935 – Philip K. Chapman, Australian-American astronaut and engineer (died 2021)
- 1935 – Shamsuddin Qasemi, Bangladeshi Islamic scholar and politician (died 1996)
- 1936 – Canaan Banana, Zimbabwean minister and politician, 1st President of Zimbabwe (died 2003)
- 1936 – Dale Douglass, American golfer (died 2022)
- 1936 – Dean Stockwell, American actor (died 2021)
- 1937 – Olusegun Obasanjo, Nigerian general and politician, 5th President of Nigeria
- 1938 – Paul Evans, American singer-songwriter and guitarist
- 1938 – Lynn Margulis, American biologist and academic (died 2011)
- 1938 – Fred Williamson, American football player, actor, director, producer, and screenwriter
- 1939 – Samantha Eggar, English actress (died 2025)
- 1939 – Tony Rundle, Australian politician, Premier of Tasmania (died 2025)
- 1939 – Benyamin Sueb, Indonesian actor and comedian (died 1995)
- 1939 – Peter Woodcock, Canadian serial killer (died 2010)
- 1939 – Pierre Wynants, Belgian chef
- 1940 – Tom Butler, English bishop
- 1940 – Ken Irvine, Australian rugby league player (died 1990)
- 1940 – Graham McRae, New Zealand race car driver (died 2021)
- 1940 – Sepp Piontek, German footballer and manager (died 2026)
- 1941 – Des Wilson, New Zealand-English businessman and activist
- 1942 – Felipe González, Spanish lawyer and politician, Prime Minister of Spain
- 1942 – Mike Resnick, American author and editor (died 2020)
- 1943 – Lucio Battisti, Italian singer-songwriter and guitarist (died 1998)
- 1944 – Peter Brandes, Danish painter and sculptor
- 1944 – Roy Gutman, American journalist and author
- 1945 – Wilf Tranter, English footballer
- 1946 – Richard Bell, Canadian pianist (died 2007)
- 1946 – Guerrino Boatto, Italian illustrator and painter (died 2018)
- 1946 – Graham Hawkins, English footballer and manager (died 2016)
- 1946 – Murray Head, English actor and singer
- 1947 – Clodagh Rodgers, Northern Irish singer and actress (died 2025)
- 1947 – Kent Tekulve, American baseball player and sportscaster
- 1948 – Eddy Grant, Guyanese-British singer-songwriter and musician
- 1948 – Richard Hickox, English conductor and scholar (died 2008)
- 1948 – Elaine Paige, English singer and actress
- 1948 – Paquirri, Spanish bullfighter (died 1984)
- 1948 – Jan van Beveren, Dutch footballer and coach (died 2011)
- 1949 – Bernard Arnault, French businessman, philanthropist, and art collector
- 1949 – Franz Josef Jung, German lawyer and politician, German Federal Minister of Defence
- 1949 – Tom Russell, American singer-songwriter and guitarist
- 1950 – Bernard Vera, French politician
- 1951 – Rodney Hogg, Australian cricketer and coach
- 1952 – Petar Borota, Serbian footballer and coach (died 2010)
- 1952 – Alan Clark, English musician and songwriter
- 1952 – Robin Hobb, American author
- 1952 – Mike Squires, American baseball player and scout
- 1953 – Katarina Frostenson, Swedish poet and author
- 1953 – Michael J. Sandel, American philosopher and academic
- 1953 – Tokyo Sexwale, South African businessman and politician, 1st Premier of Gauteng
- 1954 – João Lourenço, Angolan politician, 3rd President of Angola
- 1954 – Marsha Warfield, American actress
- 1955 – Penn Jillette, American magician, actor, and author
- 1956 – Adriana Barraza, Mexican actress
- 1956 – Teena Marie, American singer-songwriter and producer (died 2010)
- 1956 – Christopher Snowden, English engineer and academic
- 1957 – Mark E. Smith, English singer, songwriter and musician (died 2018)
- 1957 – Ray Suarez, American journalist and author
- 1958 – Volodymyr Bezsonov, Ukrainian footballer and manager
- 1958 – Bob Forward, American director, producer, and screenwriter
- 1958 – Andy Gibb, English-Australian singer-songwriter and actor (died 1988)
- 1959 – Talia Balsam, American actress
- 1959 – Vazgen Sargsyan, Armenian colonel and politician, 8th Prime Minister of Armenia (died 1999)
- 1960 – Paul Drayson, Baron Drayson, English businessman and politician, Minister for Defence Equipment, Support and Technology
- 1960 – Mike Munchak, American football player and coach
- 1960 – David Tibet, English musician, poet and songwriter.
- 1963 – Joel Osteen, American pastor, author, and television host
- 1964 – Bertrand Cantat, French singer-songwriter
- 1964 – Scott Skiles, American basketball player and coach
- 1964 – Gerald Vanenburg, Dutch footballer and manager
- 1964 – Reggie Williams, American basketball player and coach
- 1965 – José Semedo, Portuguese footballer and coach
- 1966 – Oh Eun-sun, South Korean mountaineer
- 1966 – Bob Halkidis, Canadian ice hockey player and coach
- 1966 – Michael Irvin, American football player, sportscaster, and actor
- 1966 – Aasif Mandvi, Indian-American actor, producer, and screenwriter
- 1966 – Zachary Stevens, American singer-songwriter
- 1968 – Gordon Bajnai, Hungarian businessman and politician, 7th Prime Minister of Hungary
- 1968 – Theresa Villiers, English lawyer and politician, Secretary of State for Northern Ireland
- 1969 – Paul Blackthorne, English actor and producer
- 1969 – Danny King, English author and playwright
- 1969 – Moussa Saïb, Algerian footballer and manager
- 1969 – M.C. Solaar, Senegalese-French rapper
- 1970 – Mike Brown, American basketball player and coach
- 1970 – John Frusciante, American singer-songwriter, guitarist, and producer
- 1970 – Yuu Watase, Japanese illustrator
- 1970 – Aleksandar Vučić, Serbian president
- 1971 – Greg Berry, English footballer and coach
- 1971 – Jeffrey Hammonds, American baseball player and scout
- 1971 – Yuri Lowenthal, American voice actor, producer, and screenwriter
- 1971 – Filip Meirhaeghe, Belgian cyclist
- 1971 – Mark Protheroe, Australian rugby league player
- 1972 – Brian Grant, American basketball player
- 1973 – Yannis Anastasiou, Greek footballer and manager
- 1973 – Nelly Arcan, Canadian author (died 2009)
- 1973 – Juan Esnáider, Argentine footballer and manager
- 1973 – Ryan Franklin, American baseball player
- 1973 – Nicole Pratt, Australian tennis player, coach, and sportscaster
- 1973 – Špela Pretnar, Slovenian skier
- 1974 – Kevin Connolly, American actor and director
- 1974 – Jens Jeremies, German footballer
- 1974 – Matt Lucas, English actor, comedian, writer, and television personality
- 1974 – Eva Mendes, American model and actress
- 1975 – Jolene Blalock, American model and actress
- 1975 – Luciano Burti, Brazilian race car driver and sportscaster
- 1975 – Sasho Petrovski, Australian footballer
- 1975 – Chris Silverwood, English cricketer and coach
- 1976 – Neil Jackson, English actor, producer, and screenwriter
- 1976 – Šarūnas Jasikevičius, Lithuanian basketball player and coach
- 1976 – Paul Konerko, American baseball player
- 1976 – Norm Maxwell, New Zealand rugby player
- 1977 – Taismary Agüero, Cuban-Italian volleyball player
- 1977 – Bryan Berard, American ice hockey player
- 1977 – Wally Szczerbiak, American basketball player and sportscaster
- 1978 – Jared Crouch, Australian footballer
- 1978 – Mike Hessman, American baseball player and coach
- 1978 – Kimberly McCullough, American actress, singer, and dancer
- 1978 – Carlos Ochoa, Mexican footballer
- 1979 – Martin Axenrot, Swedish drummer
- 1979 – Érik Bédard, Canadian baseball player
- 1979 – Lee Mears, English rugby player
- 1980 – Shay Carl, American businessman, co-founded Maker Studios
- 1981 – Barret Jackman, Canadian ice hockey player
- 1981 – Paul Martin, American ice hockey player
- 1981 – Karolina Wydra, Polish-American actress and model
- 1982 – Dan Carter, New Zealand rugby player
- 1982 – Philipp Haastrup, German footballer
- 1983 – Édgar Dueñas, Mexican footballer
- 1984 – Branko Cvetković, Serbian basketball player
- 1984 – Guillaume Hoarau, French footballer
- 1985 – David Marshall, Scottish footballer
- 1985 – Kenichi Matsuyama, Japanese actor
- 1985 – Brad Mills, American baseball player
- 1986 – Alexandre Barthe, French footballer
- 1986 – Corey Brewer, American basketball player and coach
- 1986 – Matty Fryatt, English footballer
- 1986 – Shikabala, Egyptian footballer
- 1987 – Anna Chakvetadze, Russian tennis player
- 1987 – Chris Cohen, English footballer
- 1988 – Jovana Brakočević, Serbian volleyball player
- 1988 – Liassine Cadamuro-Bentaïba, Algerian footballer
- 1989 – Sterling Knight, American actor, singer, and dancer
- 1989 – Jake Lloyd, American actor
- 1990 – Danny Drinkwater, English footballer
- 1990 – Mason Plumlee, American basketball player
- 1990 – Alex Smithies, English footballer
- 1991 – Ramiro Funes Mori, Argentine footballer
- 1991 – Daniil Trifonov, Russian pianist and composer
- 1992 – Sam Bankman-Fried, American businessman and fraudster
- 1993 – El Hadji Ba, French footballer
- 1993 – Joshua Coyne, American violinist and composer
- 1993 – Fred, Brazilian footballer
- 1993 – Ahmed Hassan, Egyptian footballer
- 1993 – Harry Maguire, English footballer
- 1993 – Kyle Schwarber, American baseball player
- 1994 – Daria Saville, Russian-Australian tennis player
- 1994 – MJ, South Korean singer and actor
- 1996 – Taylor Hill, American model
- 1996 – Emmanuel Mudiay, Congolese-American basketball player
- 1997 – Milena Venega, Cuban rower
- 1998 – Bo Bichette, American baseball player
- 1999 – Madison Beer, American singer-songwriter
- 1999 – Justin Fields, American football player
- 1999 – Yeri, South Korean singer and actress
- 2000 – Doug Edert, American basketball player
- 2007 – Roman Griffin Davis, English actor

== Deaths ==
=== Pre-1600 ===
- 254 – Pope Lucius I
- 824 – Suppo I, Frankish nobleman
- 1239 – Hermann Balk, German knight
- 1410 – Matthew of Kraków, Polish reformer (born 1335)
- 1417 – Manuel III Megas Komnenos, Emperor of Trebizond (born 1364)
- 1534 – Antonio da Correggio, Italian painter and educator (born 1489)
- 1539 – Nuno da Cunha, Portuguese admiral and politician, Governor of Portuguese India (born 1487)
- 1539 – Kaspar Ursinus Velius, German humanist scholar, poet and historian (1493).
- 1599 – Guido Panciroli, Italian historian and jurist (born 1523)

=== 1601–1900 ===
- 1611 – Shimazu Yoshihisa, Japanese daimyō (born 1533)
- 1622 – Ranuccio I Farnese, Duke of Parma (born 1569)
- 1695 – Henry Wharton, English writer and librarian (born 1664)
- 1726 – Evelyn Pierrepont, 1st Duke of Kingston-upon-Hull, English politician, Lord President of the Council (born 1655)
- 1770 – Crispus Attucks, American slave, sailor, and stevedore, generally regarded as the first victim of the Boston Massacre (born 1723)
- 1778 – Thomas Arne, English composer and educator (born 1710)
- 1815 – Franz Mesmer, German physician and astrologist (born 1734)
- 1827 – Pierre-Simon Laplace, French mathematician and astronomer (born 1749)
- 1827 – Alessandro Volta, Italian physicist and academic (born 1745)
- 1829 – John Adams, English sailor and mutineer (born 1766)
- 1849 – David Scott, Scottish historical painter (born 1806)
- 1876 – Marie d'Agoult, German-French historian and author (born 1805)
- 1889 – Mary Louise Booth, American writer, editor and translator (born 1831)
- 1893 – Hippolyte Taine, French historian and critic (born 1828)
- 1895 – Nikolai Leskov, Russian author, playwright, and journalist (born 1831)
- 1895 – Sir Henry Rawlinson, 1st Baronet, English general and scholar (born 1810)

=== 1901–present ===
- 1907 – Friedrich Blass, German philologist, scholar, and academic (born 1843)
- 1925 – Johan Jensen, Danish mathematician and engineer (born 1859)
- 1927 – Franz Mertens, Polish-Austrian mathematician and academic (born 1840)
- 1929 – David Dunbar Buick, Scottish-American businessman, founded Buick (born 1854)
- 1934 – Reşit Galip, Turkish academic and politician, 6th Turkish Minister of National Education (born 1893)
- 1935 – Roque Ruaño, Spanish priest and engineer (born 1877)
- 1940 – Cai Yuanpei, Chinese philosopher and academic (born 1868)
- 1942 – George Plant, executed Irish Republican (born 1904)
- 1944 – Max Jacob, French poet and author (born 1876)
- 1945 – Lena Baker, African American held captive post slavery-era (born 1900)
- 1947 – Alfredo Casella, Italian pianist, composer, and conductor (born 1883)
- 1950 – Edgar Lee Masters, American poet, author, and playwright (born 1868)
- 1950 – Roman Shukhevych, Ukrainian general and politician (born 1907)
- 1953 – Herman J. Mankiewicz, American screenwriter and producer (born 1897)
- 1953 – Sergei Prokofiev, Russian pianist, composer, and conductor (born 1891)
- 1953 – Joseph Stalin, Soviet dictator and politician of Georgian descent, 2nd leader of the Soviet Union (born 1878)
- 1955 – Antanas Merkys, Lithuanian lawyer and politician, 14th Prime Minister of Lithuania (born 1888)
- 1962 – Nell W. Walker, American politician and banker (born 1888)
- 1963 – Patsy Cline, American singer-songwriter (born 1932)
- 1963 – Cowboy Copas, American singer-songwriter and guitarist (born 1913)
- 1963 – Hawkshaw Hawkins, American singer-songwriter and guitarist (born 1921)
- 1965 – Chen Cheng, Chinese general and politician, 27th Premier of the Republic of China (born 1897)
- 1965 – Pepper Martin, American baseball player and manager (born 1904)
- 1966 – Anna Akhmatova, Ukrainian-Russian poet, author, and translator (born 1889)
- 1967 – Mischa Auer, Russian-American actor (born 1905)
- 1967 – Mohammad Mosaddegh, Iranian political scientist and politician, 60th Prime Minister of Iran (born 1882)
- 1967 – Georges Vanier, Canadian general and politician, 19th Governor General of Canada (born 1888)
- 1971 – Allan Nevins, American journalist and author (born 1890)
- 1973 – Robert C. O'Brien, American journalist and author (born 1918)
- 1974 – John Samuel Bourque, Canadian colonel and politician (born 1894)
- 1974 – Billy De Wolfe, American actor (born 1907)
- 1974 – Sol Hurok, Ukrainian-American businessman (born 1888)
- 1976 – Otto Tief, Estonian lawyer and politician, Prime Minister of Estonia (born 1889)
- 1977 – Tom Pryce, Welsh race car driver (born 1949)
- 1980 – Jay Silverheels, Canadian-American actor (born 1912)
- 1981 – Yip Harburg, American songwriter and composer (born 1896)
- 1982 – John Belushi, American actor (born 1949)
- 1984 – Tito Gobbi, Italian operatic baritone (born 1913)
- 1984 – William Powell, American actor (born 1892)
- 1988 – Alberto Olmedo, Argentine comedian and actor (born 1933)
- 1990 – Gary Merrill, American actor and director (born 1915)
- 1995 – Vivian Stanshall, English singer-songwriter and musician (born 1943)
- 1996 – Whit Bissell, American character actor (born 1909)
- 1997 – Samm Sinclair Baker, American writer (born 1909)
- 1997 – Jean Dréville, French director and screenwriter (born 1906)
- 1999 – Richard Kiley, American actor and singer (born 1922)
- 2000 – Lolo Ferrari, French dancer, actress and singer (born 1963)
- 2005 – David Sheppard, English cricketer and bishop (born 1929)
- 2008 – Joseph Weizenbaum, German computer scientist and author (born 1923)
- 2010 – Charles B. Pierce, American director, producer, and screenwriter (born 1938)
- 2010 – Richard Stapley, British actor and writer (born 1923)
- 2011 – Manolis Rasoulis, Greek singer-songwriter (born 1945)
- 2012 – Paul Haines, New Zealand-Australian author (born 1970)
- 2012 – Philip Madoc, Welsh-English actor (born 1934)
- 2012 – William O. Wooldridge, American sergeant (born 1922)
- 2013 – Paul Bearer, American wrestler and manager (born 1954)
- 2013 – Hugo Chávez, Venezuelan colonel and politician, President of Venezuela (born 1954)
- 2013 – Duane Gish, American biochemist and academic (born 1921)
- 2014 – Geoff Edwards, American actor and game show host (born 1931)
- 2014 – Ailsa McKay, Scottish economist and academic (born 1963)
- 2014 – Leopoldo María Panero, Spanish poet and translator (born 1948)
- 2014 – Ola L. Mize, American colonel, Medal of Honor recipient (born 1931)
- 2015 – Vlada Divljan, Serbian singer-songwriter and guitarist (born 1958)
- 2015 – Edward Egan, American cardinal and former Archbishop of New York (born 1932)
- 2016 – Hassan Al-Turabi, Sudanese activist and politician (born 1932)
- 2016 – Ray Tomlinson, American computer programmer and engineer (born 1941)
- 2016 – Al Wistert, American football player and coach (born 1920)
- 2017 – Kurt Moll, German opera singer (born 1938)

== Holidays and observances ==
- Christian feast day:
  - Ciarán of Saigir
  - John Joseph of the Cross
  - Piran
  - Theophilus, bishop of Caesarea
  - Thietmar of Minden
  - March 5 (Eastern Orthodox liturgics)
- Learn from Lei Feng Day (China)
- St Piran's Day (Cornwall)
