= Marburg (electoral district) =

Federal electoral district of Germany

Coordinates: 50.8368°N 8.7380°E

170 Marburg
- Electoral district for the Bundestag
- Marburg in 2025
- State: Hesse
- Population: 247,100 (2019)
- Electorate: 181,588 (2021)
- Major settlements: Marburg; Stadtallendorf; Kirchhain
- Area: 1,262.4 km^{2}

Current electoral district
- Created: 1949
- Party: SPD
- Member: Sören Bartol
- Elected: 2002, 2005, 2009, 2013, 2017, 2021, 2025

Marburg is an electoral constituency (German: Wahlkreis) represented in the Bundestag. It elects one member via first-past-the-post voting. Under the current constituency numbering system, it is designated as constituency 170. It is located in northern Hesse, comprising the Marburg-Biedenkopf district.

Marburg was created for the inaugural 1949 federal election. Since 2002, it has been represented by Sören Bartol of the Social Democratic Party (SPD).

== Geography ==
Marburg is located in northern Hesse. As of the 2021 federal election, it is coterminous with the Marburg-Biedenkopf district.

== History ==
Marburg was created in 1949. In the 1949 election, it was Hesse constituency 6 in the numbering system. In the 1953 through 1976 elections, it was number 131. From 1980 through 1998, it was number 129. In 2002 and 2005, it was number 173. In the 2009 election, it was number 172. In the 2013 through 2021 elections, it was number 171. From the 2025 election, it has been number 170.

Originally, the constituency comprised the independent city of Marburg and the districts of Biedenkopf and Landkreis Marburg. In the 1965 election, it lost the municipality of Schiffelbach from the Landkreis Marburg district. It acquired its current borders in the 1976 election.

Election	No.	Name	Borders
1949	6	Marburg	Marburg city; Biedenkopf district; Landkreis Marburg district
1953	131	Marburg	Marburg city; Biedenkopf district; Landkreis Marburg district
1957	131	Marburg	Marburg city; Biedenkopf district; Landkreis Marburg district
1961	131	Marburg	Marburg city; Biedenkopf district; Landkreis Marburg district
1965	131	Marburg	Marburg city; Biedenkopf district; Landkreis Marburg district (excluding Schiffelbach municipality)
1969	131	Marburg	Marburg city; Biedenkopf district; Landkreis Marburg district (excluding Schiffelbach municipality)
1972	131	Marburg	Marburg city; Biedenkopf district; Landkreis Marburg district (excluding Schiffelbach municipality)
1976	131	Marburg	Marburg-Biedenkopf district
1980	129	Marburg	Marburg-Biedenkopf district
1983	129	Marburg	Marburg-Biedenkopf district
1987	129	Marburg	Marburg-Biedenkopf district
1990	129	Marburg	Marburg-Biedenkopf district
1994	129	Marburg	Marburg-Biedenkopf district
1998	129	Marburg	Marburg-Biedenkopf district
2002	173	Marburg	Marburg-Biedenkopf district
2005	173	Marburg	Marburg-Biedenkopf district
2009	172	Marburg	Marburg-Biedenkopf district
2013	171	Marburg	Marburg-Biedenkopf district
2017	171	Marburg	Marburg-Biedenkopf district
2021	171	Marburg	Marburg-Biedenkopf district
2025	170	Marburg	Marburg-Biedenkopf district

== Members ==
The constituency was first represented by Ludwig Preiß from 1949 to 1961. In the 1949 and 1953 elections, he represented by Free Democratic Party (FDP); in 1957, he was elected for the German Party (DP). Gerhard Jahn of the Social Democratic Party (SPD) was elected in 1961, but former member Preiß won the constituency in 1965, this time representing the Christian Democratic Union (CDU). Jahn was elected again in 1969 and served until 1983. Friedrich Bohl of the CDU was elected in 1983 and was representative until 1994. Brigitte Lange regained the constituency for the SPD in 1994, and served until 2002. Sören Bartol was elected in 2002, and re-elected in 2005, 2009, 2013, 2017, and 2021.

Election	Member	Party	%
1949	Ludwig Preiß	FDP	36.2
1953	Ludwig Preiß	FDP	33.6
1957	Ludwig Preiß	DP	41.9
1961	Gerhard Jahn	SPD	41.5
1965	Ludwig Preiß	CDU	44.9
1969	Gerhard Jahn	SPD	49.2
1972	Gerhard Jahn	SPD	53.4
1976	Gerhard Jahn	SPD	47.3
1980	Gerhard Jahn	SPD	49.6
1983	Friedrich Bohl	CDU	47.6
1987	Friedrich Bohl	CDU	43.6
1990	Friedrich Bohl	CDU	42.3
1994	Brigitte Lange	SPD	43.1
1998	Brigitte Lange	SPD	47.7
2002	Sören Bartol	SPD	47.8
2005	Sören Bartol	SPD	47.5
2009	Sören Bartol	SPD	38.9
2013	Sören Bartol	SPD	43.7
2017	Sören Bartol	SPD	35.7
2021	Sören Bartol	SPD	36.9
2025	Sören Bartol	SPD	30.3

== Election results ==
=== 2025 election ===
Federal election (2025): Marbueg
Notes:	Blue background denotes the winner of the electorate vote. Pink background denotes a candidate elected from their party list. Yellow background denotes an electorate win by a list member, or other incumbent. A ✓ or ✗ denotes status of any incumbent, win or lose respectively.						
Party	Candidate	Votes	%	±%	Party votes	%	±%
SPD	✓ Sören Bartol	45,774	30.3	▼6.6	31,104	20.5	▼9.5
CDU	Stefan Heck	44,013	29.1	▲3.0	39,797	26.3	▲4.2
AfD	Julian Schmidt	27,634	18.3	▲9.3	27,522	18.2	▲9.2
Greens	Andreas May	13,738	9.1	▼4.3	19,597	12.9	▼3.0
Left	Philipp Henning	11,452	7.6	▲2.9	16,006	10.6	▲4.8
BSW					5,923	3.9	New
FDP	Alexander Keller	3,481	2.3	▼4.4	5,910	3.9	▼6.6
FW	Gökhan Özdemir	2,642	1.7	▲0.2	1,877	1.2	0.0
Tierschutzpartei					1,690	1.1	▼0.2
Volt	Kai Malyska	1,494	1.0	New	944	0.4	▲0.3
PARTEI					651	0.4	▼0.4
Independent	Jürgen Reitz	471	0.3	New			
Independent	Jack Wächter	258	0.2	New			
BD					213	0.1	New
Independent	Jan Sollwedel	206	0.1	New			
Humanists					115	0.1	0.0
MLPD					32	<0.1	0.0
Informal votes		1,188			970		
Total valid votes		151,163			151,381		
Turnout		152,351	84.7	▲6.7			
SPD hold	Majority	1,761	1.2	▼9.6			

=== 2021 election ===
Federal election (2021): Marburg
Notes:	Blue background denotes the winner of the electorate vote. Pink background denotes a candidate elected from their party list. Yellow background denotes an electorate win by a list member, or other incumbent. A ✓ or ✗ denotes status of any incumbent, win or lose respectively.						
Party	Candidate	Votes	%	±%	Party votes	%	±%
SPD	✓ Sören Bartol	51,630	36.9	▲1.1	42,098	30.0	▲3.6
CDU	Stefan Heck	36,528	26.1	▼7.3	31,042	22.1	▼8.0
Greens	Stephanie Theiss	18,709	13.4	▲7.0	22,347	15.9	▲6.6
AfD	Julian Schmidt	12,591	9.0	▼1.2	12,558	9.0	▼2.5
FDP	Niklas Hannott	9,334	6.7	▲2.4	14,789	10.5	▲1.9
Left	Maximilian Peter	6,588	4.7	▼3.5	8,089	5.8	▼4.5
Tierschutzpartei					1,863	1.3	▲0.5
FW	Gökhan Özdemir	2,178	1.6	▲0.1	1,767	1.3	▲0.6
dieBasis	Rüdiger Schapner	2,146	1.5		1,828	1.3	
PARTEI					1,178	0.8	▼0.1
Team Todenhöfer					497	0.4	
Pirates					453	0.3	▼0.1
Volt					434	0.3	
ÖDP					291	0.2	0.0
Bündnis C					275	0.2	
Independent	Simon Carstensen	271	0.2				
Gesundheitsforschung					177	0.1	
NPD					176	0.1	▼0.1
Humanists					133	0.1	
V-Partei3					115	0.1	0.0
Independent	Karin Marinello	103	0.1				
DKP					61	0.0	0.0
Bündnis 21					43	0.0	
LKR					32	0.0	
MLPD					23	0.0	0.0
Informal votes		1,503			1,312		
Total valid votes		140,078			140,269		
Turnout		141,581	78.0	▲0.3			
SPD hold	Majority	15,102	10.8	▲8.4			

=== 2017 election ===
Federal election (2017): Marburg
Notes:	Blue background denotes the winner of the electorate vote. Pink background denotes a candidate elected from their party list. Yellow background denotes an electorate win by a list member, or other incumbent. A ✓ or ✗ denotes status of any incumbent, win or lose respectively.						
Party	Candidate	Votes	%	±%	Party votes	%	±%
SPD	✓ Sören Bartol	50,214	35.7	▼8.0	37,202	26.4	▼7.0
CDU	Stefan Heck	46,888	33.4	▼6.2	42,377	30.1	▼6.6
AfD	Julian Schmidt	14,378	10.2		16,125	11.5	▲6.9
Left	Elisabeth Kula	11,557	8.2	▲3.0	14,420	10.2	▲3.4
Greens	Rainer Flohrschütz	8,989	6.4	▲0.5	13,088	9.3	▼1.2
FDP	Hanke Friedrich Bokelmann	6,044	4.3	▲2.6	12,191	8.7	▲4.7
PARTEI					1,296	0.9	▲0.4
Tierschutzpartei					1,148	0.8	
FW	Daniel Baron	2,005	1.4		950	0.7	▲0.2
Pirates					527	0.4	▼1.4
Independent	Rainer Schmidtke	491	0.3				
NPD					357	0.3	▼0.6
ÖDP					312	0.2	
BGE					297	0.2	
DM					180	0.1	
V-Partei³					174	0.1	
DKP					64	0.0	
MLPD					45	0.0	0.0
BüSo					33	0.0	0.0
Informal votes		1,799			1,579		
Total valid votes		140,566			140,786		
Turnout		142,365	77.7	▲6.8			
SPD hold	Majority	3,326	2.3	▼1.8			

=== 2013 election ===
Federal election (2013): Marburg
Notes:	Blue background denotes the winner of the electorate vote. Pink background denotes a candidate elected from their party list. Yellow background denotes an electorate win by a list member, or other incumbent. A ✓ or ✗ denotes status of any incumbent, win or lose respectively.						
Party	Candidate	Votes	%	±%	Party votes	%	±%
SPD	✓ Sören Bartol	55,982	43.7	▲4.8	42,749	33.4	▲4.8
CDU	Stefan Heck	50,683	39.6	▲4.0	46,993	36.7	▲5.7
Greens	Matthias Knoche	7,595	5.9	▼1.9	13,443	10.5	▼2.2
Left	Janis Ehling	6,746	5.3	▼2.9	8,720	6.8	▼3.1
AfD					5,858	4.6	
Pirates	Michael Weber	2,581	2.0		2,206	1.7	▼0.2
FDP	Jörg Hartmut Behlen	2,229	1.7	▼6.5	5,111	4.0	▼9.1
NPD	Alfred Hermann Horst	1,459	1.1	▼0.1	1,034	0.8	▼0.2
PARTEI	Marcus-Alexander Assmann	727	0.6		645	0.5	
FW					593	0.5	
REP					313	0.2	▼0.4
PRO					109	0.1	
SGP					62	0.0	
BüSo					47	0.0	▼0.1
MLPD					26	0.0	0.0
Informal votes		2,943			3,036		
Total valid votes		128,002			127,909		
Turnout		130,945	70.9	▼2.2			
SPD hold	Majority	5,299	4.1	▲0.8			

=== 2009 election ===
Federal election (2009): Marburg
Notes:	Blue background denotes the winner of the electorate vote. Pink background denotes a candidate elected from their party list. Yellow background denotes an electorate win by a list member, or other incumbent. A ✓ or ✗ denotes status of any incumbent, win or lose respectively.						
Party	Candidate	Votes	%	±%	Party votes	%	±%
SPD	✓ Sören Bartol	51,712	38.9	▼8.6	38,139	28.7	▼10.2
CDU	Stefan Heck	47,322	35.6	▼1.0	41,356	31.1	▼0.8
FDP	Jörg Behlen	10,964	8.2	▲4.4	17,410	13.1	▲3.7
Left	Hans Köster-Sollwedel	10,857	8.2	▲3.3	13,181	9.9	▲3.7
Greens	Matthias Knoche	10,366	7.8	▲3.8	16,884	12.7	▲2.6
Pirates					2,625	2.0	
NPD	Manuel Mann	1,690	1.3	▲0.2	1,290	1.0	▼0.1
Tierschutzpartei					1,116	0.8	▲0.2
REP					843	0.6	▼0.6
BüSo					151	0.1	0.0
DVU					76	0.1	
MLPD					27	0.0	0.0
Informal votes		2,382			2,195		
Total valid votes		132,911			133,098		
Turnout		135,293	73.1	▼5.2			
SPD hold	Majority	4,390	3.3	▼7.6			

=== 2005 election ===
Federal election (2005):Margburg
Notes:	Blue background denotes the winner of the electorate vote. Pink background denotes a candidate elected from their party list. Yellow background denotes an electorate win by a list member, or other incumbent. A ✓ or ✗ denotes status of any incumbent, win or lose respectively.						
Party	Candidate	Votes	%	±%	Party votes	%	±%
SPD	✓ Sören Bartol	67,136	47.5	▼0.3	54,957	38.9	▼3.4
CDU	Frank Gotthardt	51,653	36.6	▼2.0	45,080	31.9	▼3.4
Left	Peter Metz	6,826	4.8	▲3.1	8,758	6.2	▲4.3
Greens	Elke Siebler	5,685	4.0	▼1.1	14,231	10.1	▼0.4
FDP	Heinrich Dingeldein	5,423	3.8	▼1.0	13,246	9.4	▲2.3
REP	Günter Haemer	1,858	1.3	▼0.3	1,807	1.3	▲0.1
NPD	Alfred Horst	1,517	1.1		1,560	1.1	▲0.9
Independent	Peter Shäfer	1,102	0.8				
Tierschutzpartei					924	0.7	▲0.2
GRAUEN					485	0.3	▲0.2
BüSo					139	0.1	0.0
SGP					128	0.1	
MLPD					43	0.0	
Informal votes		2,778			2,620		
Total valid votes		141,200			141,358		
Turnout		143,978	78.3	▼1.4			
SPD hold	Majority	15,483	10.9				
