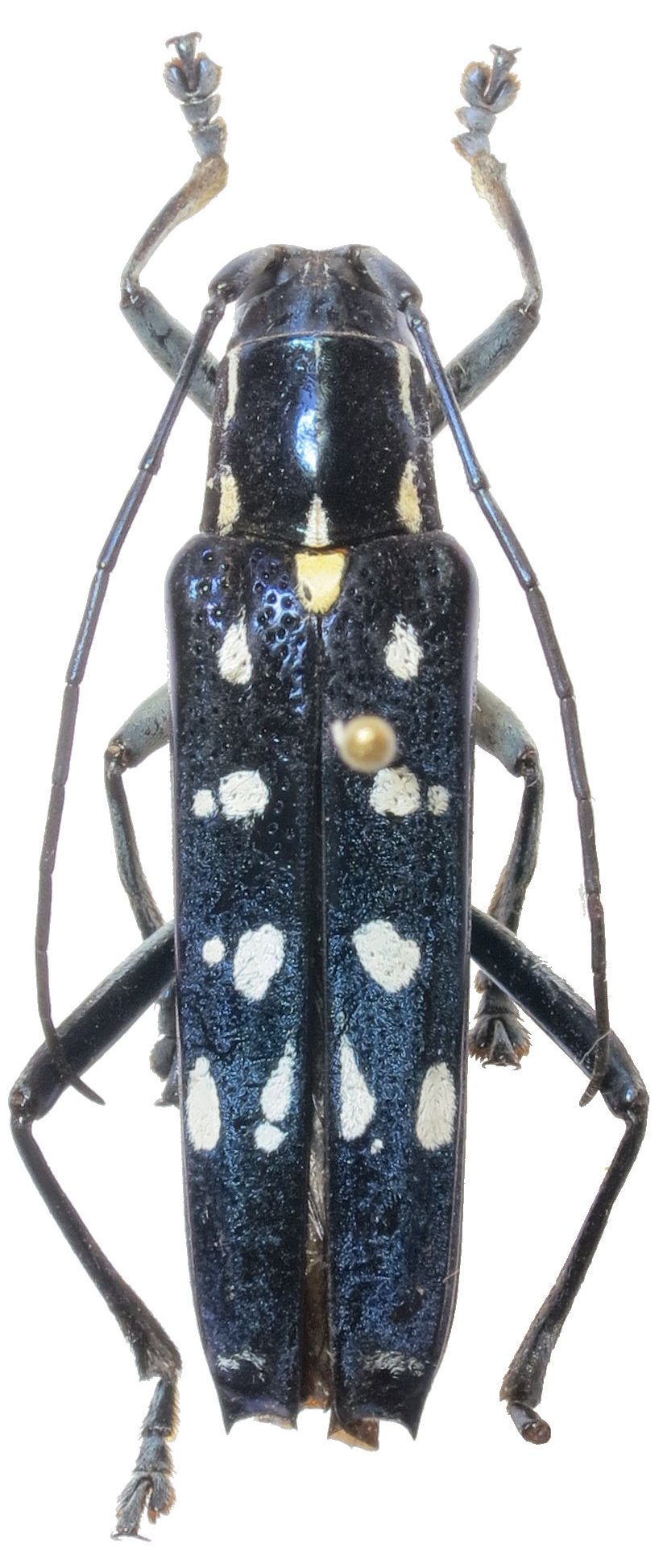
- Glenea beatrix from Philippines

Scientific classification
- Domain: Eukaryota
- Kingdom: Animalia
- Phylum: Arthropoda
- Class: Insecta
- Order: Coleoptera
- Suborder: Polyphaga
- Infraorder: Cucujiformia
- Family: Cerambycidae
- Genus: Glenea
- Species: G. beatrix

Binomial name
- Glenea beatrix Thomson, 1879

= Glenea beatrix =

Species of beetle

Glenea beatrix is a species of beetle in the family Cerambycidae. It was described by James Thomson in 1879. It is known from the Philippines.

== Subspecies ==
- Glenea beatrix beatrix Thomson, 1879
- Glenea beatrix obiensis Breuning, 1956
