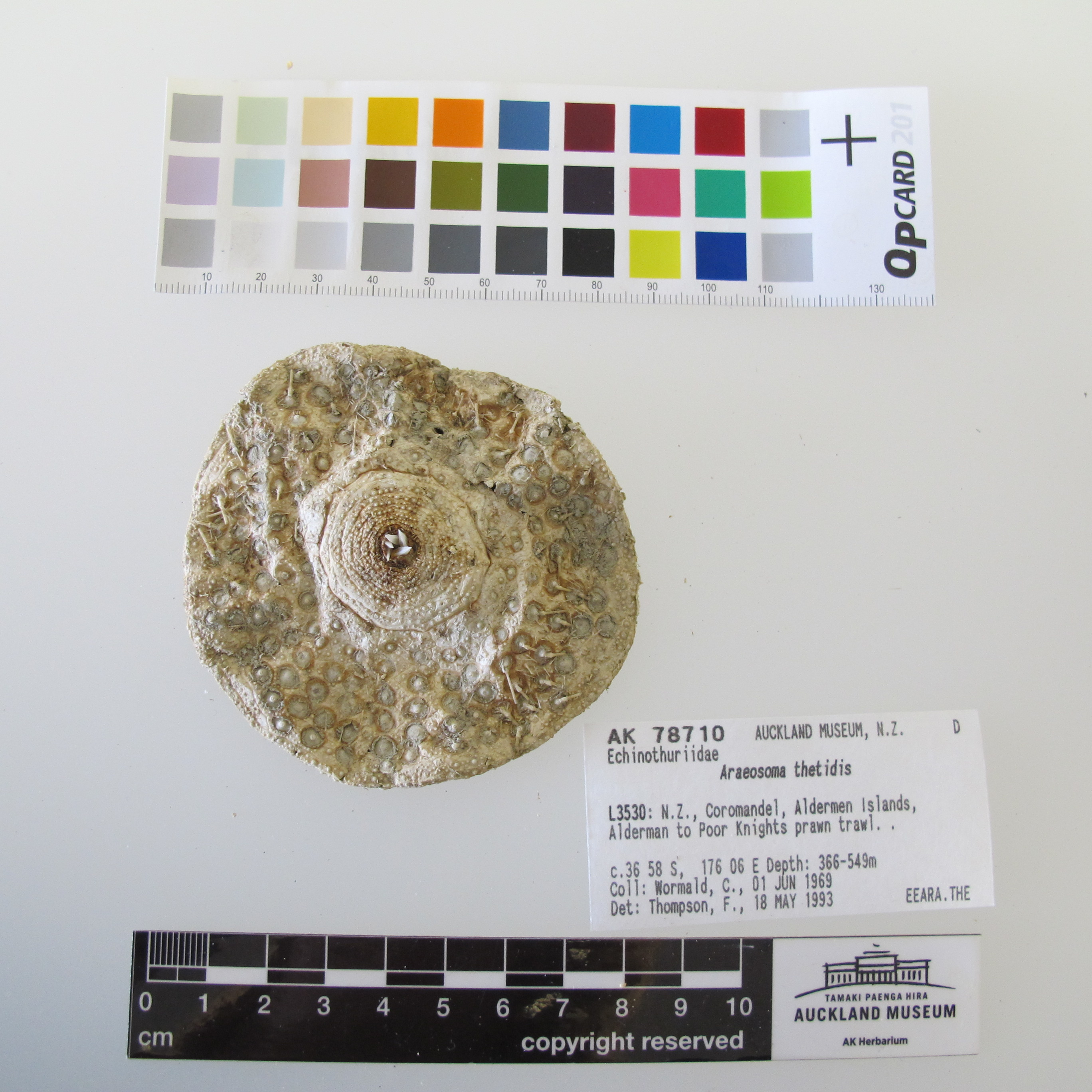
- Phormosoma bursarium (AM MA78710)

Scientific classification
- Domain: Eukaryota
- Kingdom: Animalia
- Phylum: Echinodermata
- Class: Echinoidea
- Order: Echinothurioida
- Family: Phormosomatidae
- Genus: Phormosoma; Thomson, 1872

= Phormosoma =

Genus of sea urchins

Phormosoma is a genus of echinoderms belonging to the family Phormosomatidae.

The genus was first described in 1872 by Charles Wyville Thomson. The type species is Phormosoma placenta.

== Description ==
Thomson describes the genus:

Plates overlapping slightly and forming a continuous shell, the corona coming to a sharp edge at the periphery, and the upper surface of body differing greatly in character from the lower.

== Species ==
Species accepted by WoRMS are:

1. Phormosoma bursarium A. Agassiz, 1881
2. Phormosoma placenta Thomson, 1872
3. Phormosoma rigidum A. Agassiz, 1881
4. Phormosoma verticillatum Mortensen, 1904
