= Ludwig Preiß =

German politician (1910–1996)

Member of the Bundestag; from Hesse
- In office 24 November 1964 – 13 December 1972
- Preceded by: Heinrich von Brentano
- Succeeded by: Multi-member district
- Constituency: Bergstraße (1964–1965); Marburg (1965–1969); State list (1969–1972)
- In office 7 September 1949 – 17 October 1961
- Preceded by: Constituency established
- Succeeded by: Gerhard Jahn
- Constituency: Marburg

Personal details
- Born: 25 July 1910 Leidenhofen, Germany
- Died: 14 May 1996 (aged 85) Ebsdorfergrund, Germany
- Party: Christian Democratic Union (1960–1996)
- Other political affiliations: FDP (1948–1956); FVP (1956–1957); DP (1957–1960)
- Education: University of Giessen; University of Göttingen

Ludwig Preiß (25 July 1910 – 14 May 1996) was a German politician of the Christian Democratic Union (CDU) and former member of the German Bundestag.

== Career ==
Preiß was a member of the German Bundestag from its first election in 1949 to 1961 and again from 24 November 1964, when he succeeded the late Heinrich von Brentano, until 1972. In 1949 and 1953 he represented the FDP, in 1957 the DP and again in 1965 the CDU in the constituency of Marburg. In 1969 he entered the Bundestag via the state list of the Hessian CDU.

== Literature ==
Herbst, Ludolf; Jahn, Bruno (2002). Vierhaus, Rudolf (ed.). Biographisches Handbuch der Mitglieder des Deutschen Bundestages. 1949–2002 [Biographical Handbook of the Members of the German Bundestag. 1949–2002] (in German). München: De Gruyter - De Gruyter Saur. p. 1715. ISBN 978-3-11-184511-1.
