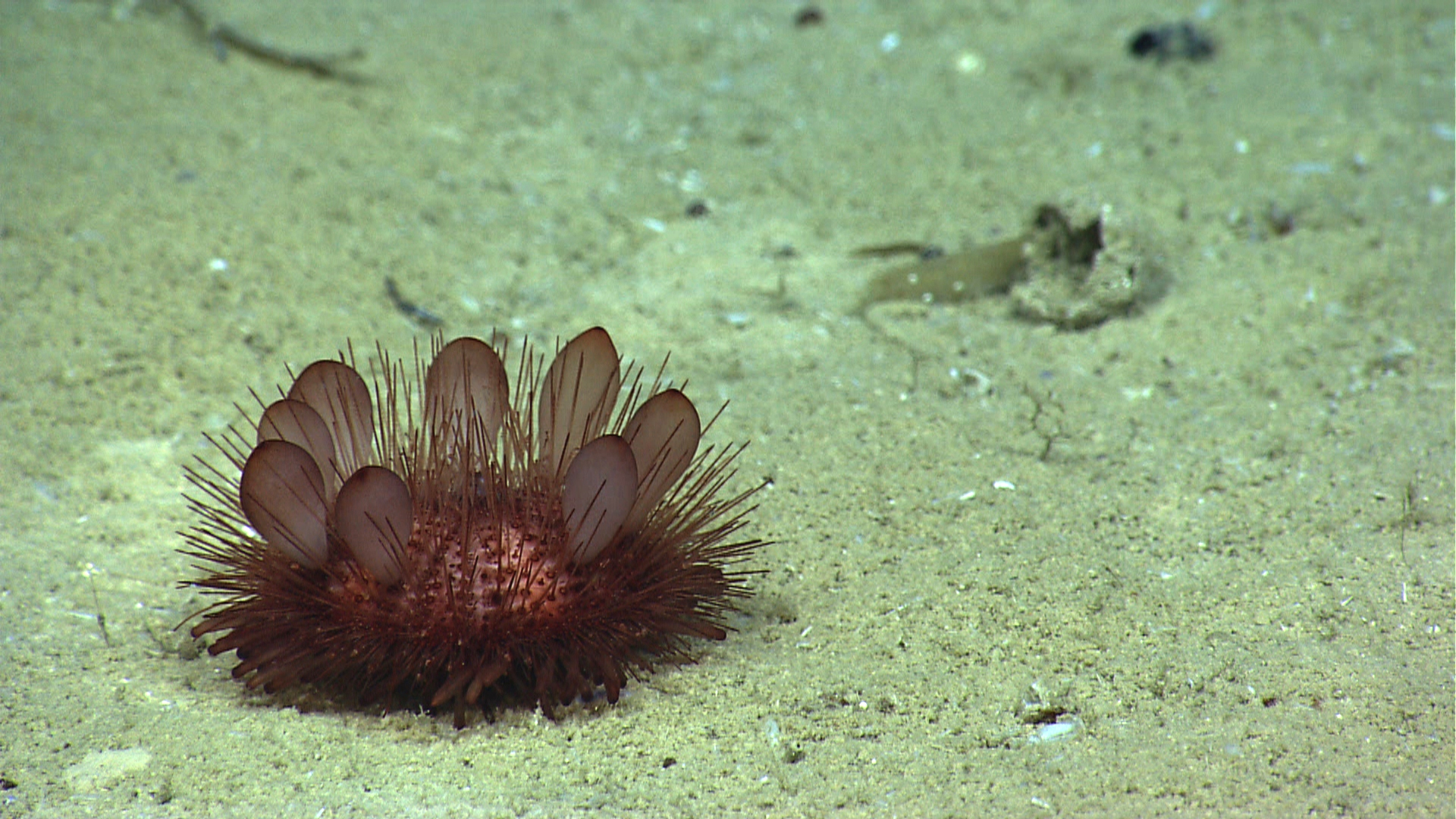

Conservation status
- Secure (NatureServe)

Scientific classification
- Kingdom: Animalia
- Phylum: Echinodermata
- Class: Echinoidea
- Order: Echinothurioida
- Family: Phormosomatidae
- Genus: Phormosoma
- Species: P. placenta

Binomial name
- Phormosoma placenta Thomson, 1872

= Phormosoma placenta =

Species of sea urchin

Phormosoma placenta is a species of sea urchin in the order Echinothurioida. It is a deepwater species, seldom being found at depths less than 500 m (1,600 ft), and occurs on either side of the Atlantic Ocean on the continental slope.

== Description ==
Phormosoma placenta is a yellowish-brown colour and can grow to a diameter of 12 cm (5 in). The flexible test is dome-shaped above and flattened beneath. The plates from which the test is made overlap each other and are bound together by a membranous connection. Specimens removed from the water usually collapse into disc shapes. The upper (aboral) surface has few primary tubercles and spines but the lower (oral) surface is densely covered in perforated tubercles from which slender, club-shaped spines project, each one embedded in a membranous sac. These spines articulate with the tubercles and are used to support the animal and also in locomotion. Observations of live individuals on the seabed show that the few spines on the aboral surface are also enclosed in large membranous sacs, but these are usually destroyed in bringing the animal to the surface.

== Distribution and habitat ==
P. placenta is found in the Atlantic Ocean from Iceland and Greenland south to the Caribbean Sea in the west and the Gulf of Guinea in the east. The three recognised subspecies are: P. p. placenta, which occurs in the northerly part of the range, P. p. sigsbei in the Caribbean, and P. p. africana off the coast of Africa. The depth range is normally 500 to 3,700 m (1,600 to 12,100 ft), but individuals are occasionally found at shallower depths.

== Biology ==
Phormosoma placenta is a gregarious species and can sometimes be found aggregating in large groups on sand and coral rubble substrates. It is believed to be an omnivore, primarily eating algal fragments which sink to the seabed or other detritus. Examination of its stomach contents has found 3 mm (0.1 in) pellets of mud bound together by mucus.

Juvenile cusk-eels have been found to associate with P. placenta, either hiding underneath it or between the long spines on its aboral surface. The fish are believed to receive protection from predators among the spines and may be able to feed in areas with few natural refugia.

Like other sea urchins, P. placenta is gonochoristic, individual animals being either male or female. The eggs contain large yolks and are buoyant. They are fertilised by sperm released by males and rise at the rate of 25 cm (9.8 in) per minute, taking two days to ascend from bathyal depths to the surface. They later lose their buoyancy and sink to the seabed. The embryos feed on their yolks and develop directly without a planktonic larval stage. P. placenta does not seem to be seasonal in its reproductive activities, spawning at any time of year. The aggregation of many individuals in one area increases the chances of fertilisation taking place and the buoyancy of the eggs should aid in their dispersal.

== Taxonomy ==
The species was first described in 1872 by Charles Wyville Thomson, from a specimen dredged from a depth of 500 fathoms of the Butt of Lews, and from fragments taken in deep waters of the Rockall Channel.
