= Glenea corona =

Scientific classification
- Domain: Eukaryota
- Kingdom: Animalia
- Phylum: Arthropoda
- Class: Insecta
- Order: Coleoptera
- Suborder: Polyphaga
- Infraorder: Cucujiformia
- Family: Cerambycidae
- Genus: Glenea
- Species: G. corona

Binomial name
- Glenea corona Thomson, 1879

Species of beetle

Glenea corona is a species of beetle in the family Cerambycidae. It was described by James Thomson in 1879. It is known from the Nicobar and Andaman Islands.
