= Cottunculus sadko =

Scientific classification
- Kingdom: Animalia
- Phylum: Chordata
- Class: Actinopterygii
- Order: Perciformes
- Suborder: Cottoidei
- Family: Psychrolutidae
- Genus: Cottunculus
- Species: C. sadko

Binomial name
- Cottunculus sadko Essipov, 1937

Species of fish

Cottunculus sadko is a species of marine ray-finned fish belonging to the family Psychrolutidae, the fatheads. This species is found from Greenland to the Norwegian and Kara Seas in the northeast Atlantic Ocean. However, some authorities regard this taxon as a synonym of the Polar sculpin (C. microps).
