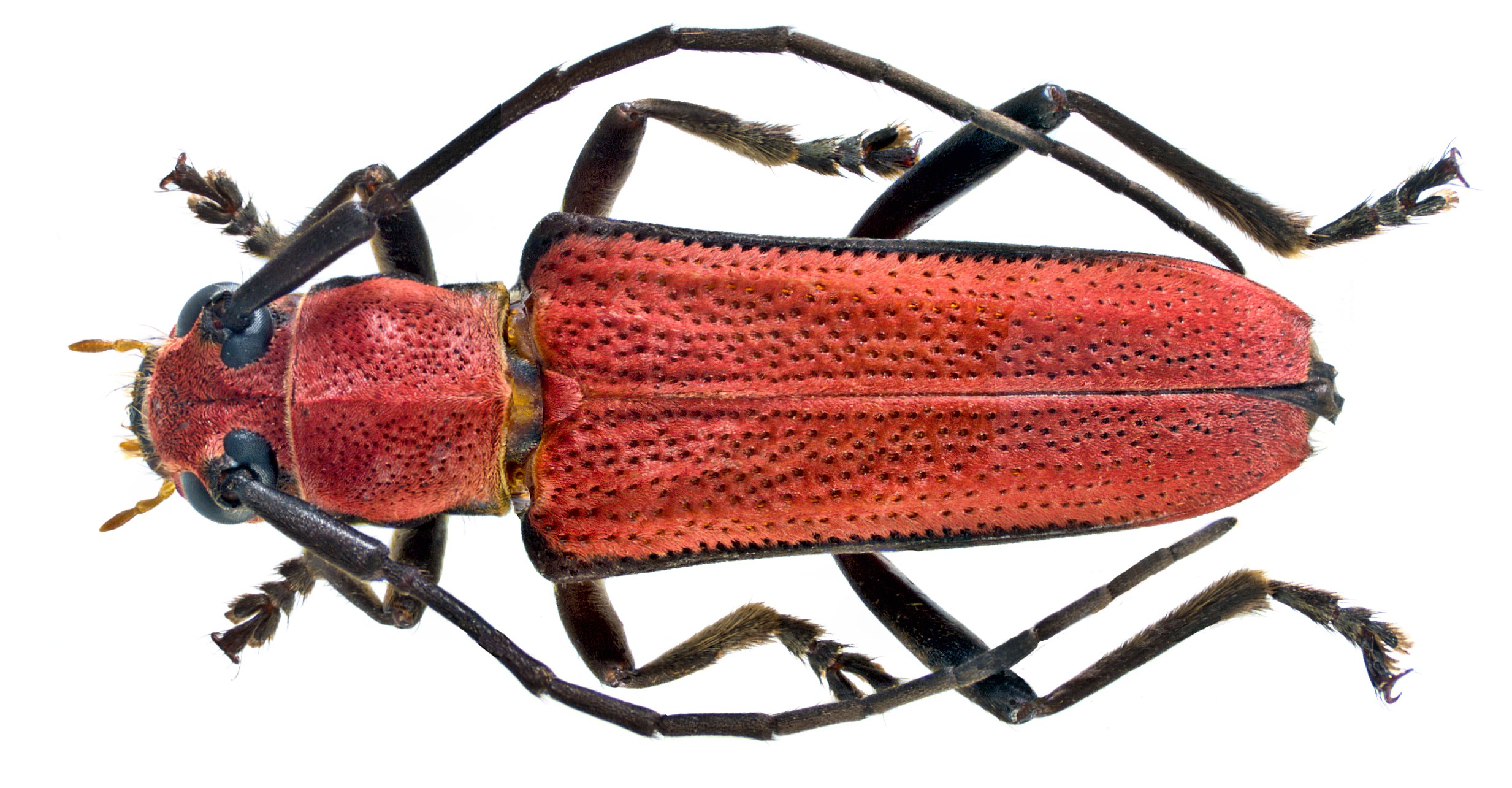

Scientific classification
- Domain: Eukaryota
- Kingdom: Animalia
- Phylum: Arthropoda
- Class: Insecta
- Order: Coleoptera
- Suborder: Polyphaga
- Infraorder: Cucujiformia
- Family: Cerambycidae
- Genus: Glenea
- Species: G. cardinalis

Binomial name
- Glenea cardinalis Thomson, 1860

Synonyms
- Glenea cardinalis cardinalis Thomson, 1860

= Glenea cardinalis =

Species of beetle

Glenea cardinalis is a species of beetle in the family Cerambycidae. It was described by Charles Wyville Thomson in 1860. It is known from India, Cambodia, and Myanmar.
