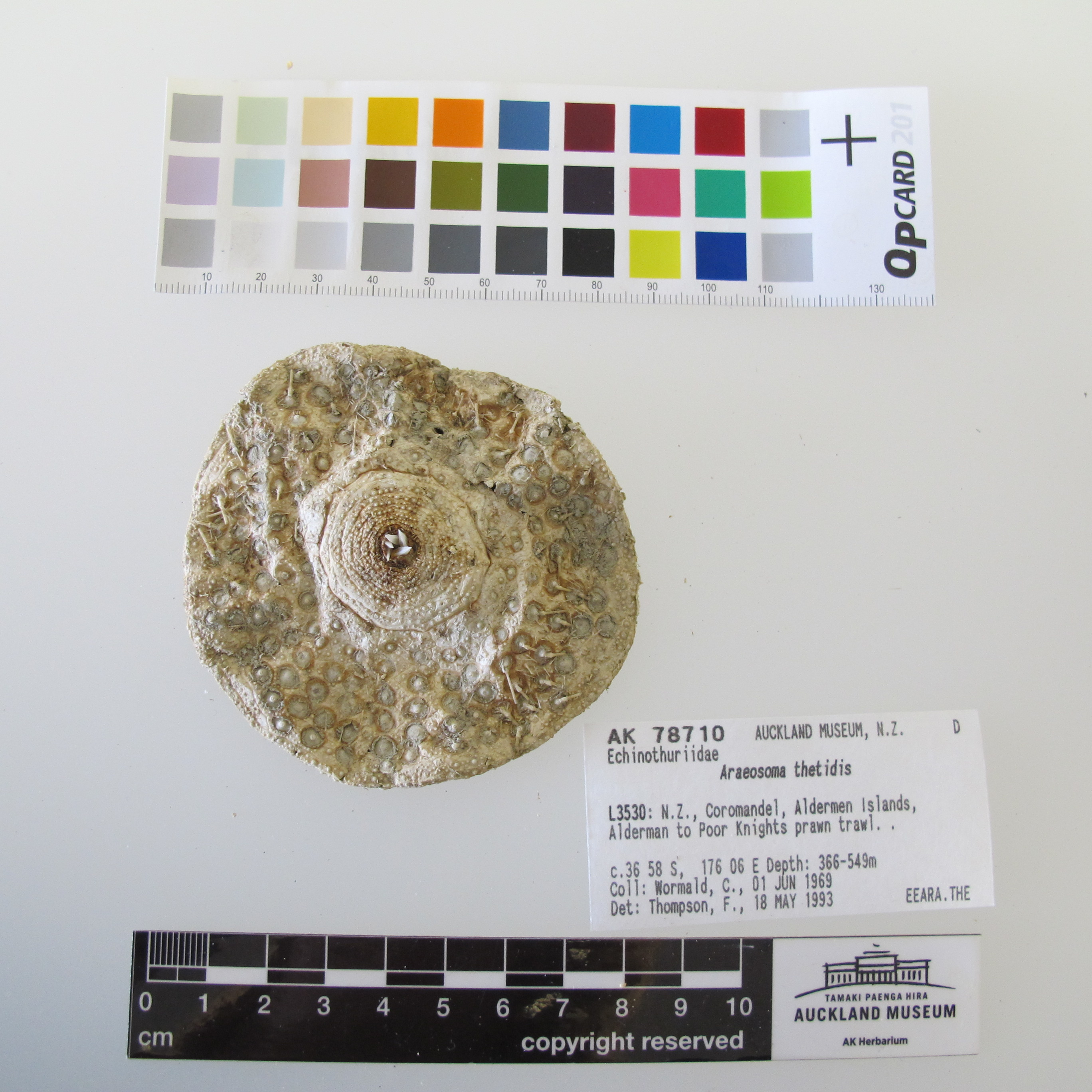
- Specimen AM MA78710

Scientific classification
- Kingdom: Animalia
- Phylum: Echinodermata
- Class: Echinoidea
- Order: Echinothurioida
- Family: Phormosomatidae
- Genus: Phormosoma
- Species: P. bursarium

Binomial name
- Phormosoma bursarium A. Agassiz, 1881
- Type site: Challenger station 200, 255 fathoms

= Phormosoma bursarium =

Species of sea urchin

Phormosoma bursarium is a species of sea urchin in the order Echinothurioida, which is found at depths between 170 metre to 2340 metre.

The species was first described in 1881 by Alexander Agassiz.

== Distribution ==
In Australia it is found in waters off Batemans Bay, NSW, and off Port Hedland, WA. It is a benthic species, found in both temperate and tropical waters.
