= Cottunculus nudus =

Scientific classification
- Domain: Eukaryota
- Kingdom: Animalia
- Phylum: Chordata
- Class: Actinopterygii
- Order: Perciformes
- Suborder: Cottoidei
- Family: Psychrolutidae
- Genus: Cottunculus
- Species: C. nudus

Binomial name
- Cottunculus nudus J. S. Nelson, 1989

Species of fish

Cottunculus nudus, the bonyskull toadfish, is a species of fish in the blobfish family Psychrolutidae. It is found in the south-western Pacific Ocean off New Zealand at depths down to 1,123 m (3,684 ft).
