= Cottunculus subspinosus =

Scientific classification
- Kingdom: Animalia
- Phylum: Chordata
- Class: Actinopterygii
- Division: Teleostei
- Order: Perciformes
- Suborder: Cottoidei
- Family: Psychrolutidae
- Genus: Cottunculus
- Species: C. subspinosus

Binomial name
- Cottunculus subspinosus A. S. Jensen, 1902

Synonyms
- Psychrolutes subspinosus (A. S. Jensen, 1902)

Species of fish

Cottunculus subspinosus is a species of marine ray-finned fish belonging to the family Psychrolutidae, the fatheads. This is a bathydemersal fish which is found at depths of 1,337 to 1,750 m (4,390 to 5,740 ft) in the northeastern Atlantic Ocean off Iceland. This species reaches a maximum published total length of 12 cm (4.7 in)
