= Cottunculus spinosus =

Conservation status
- Data Deficient (IUCN 3.1)

Scientific classification
- Kingdom: Animalia
- Phylum: Chordata
- Class: Actinopterygii
- Order: Perciformes
- Suborder: Cottoidei
- Family: Psychrolutidae
- Genus: Cottunculus
- Species: C. spinosus

Binomial name
- Cottunculus spinosus Gilchrist, 1906

Synonyms
- Cottunculoides spinosus (Gilchrist, 1906)

Species of fish

Cottunculus spinosus is a species of fish in the blobfish family Psychrolutidae. It is found in the south-eastern Atlantic Ocean off South Africa at depths of 1,460 to 2,180 m (4,790 to 7,150 ft).

== Description ==
This species reaches a length of 4.5 cm (1.8 in).
