= Frank Wyville Thomson =

Lt Colonel Frank Wyville Thomson FRSE IMS (1860 – 27 May 1918) was a 19th/20th century Scottish military surgeon and expert on tropical medicine who advanced public health in India and a noted amateur naturalist.

== Life ==
He was born in Belfast in Ireland the only son of Jane Ramage Dawson and her husband Professor Charles Wyville Thomson. The family moved to Dublin before returning to their ancestral home in Edinburgh in 1870 when his father accepted a position as Professor of Botany at the University of Edinburgh.

He studied medicine at the University of Edinburgh graduating with an MB ChB around 1881 and became a Surgeon Captain in the 3rd Bengal Cavalry in India. He later joined the Indian Medical Service.

When his father died in 1882 he inherited the family estate of Bonyside near Linlithgow.

In 1910 he was elected a fellow of the Royal Society of Edinburgh. His proposers were Sir John Murray, a close colleague of his father, Sir William Turner, Alexander Crum Brown and George Chrystal.

He died at Bonyside on 27 May 1918 and is buried in Dean Cemetery in Edinburgh. He left an estate of £20,576 in his will.

== Family ==
In 1887 he married Ada Isabella Ramage Dawson (1864-1929) from Linlithgow, a cousin, and daughter of Colonel John Ramage Dawson of Balado (1831-1892)
