= Cottunculus granulosus =

Scientific classification
- Domain: Eukaryota
- Kingdom: Animalia
- Phylum: Chordata
- Class: Actinopterygii
- Order: Perciformes
- Suborder: Cottoidei
- Family: Psychrolutidae
- Genus: Cottunculus
- Species: C. granulosus

Binomial name
- Cottunculus granulosus Karrer, 1968

Species of fish

Cottunculus granulosus is a species of fish in the blobfish family Psychrolutidae found in the south-western Atlantic Ocean.

== Description ==
This species reaches a length of 21.7 cm (8.5 in).
