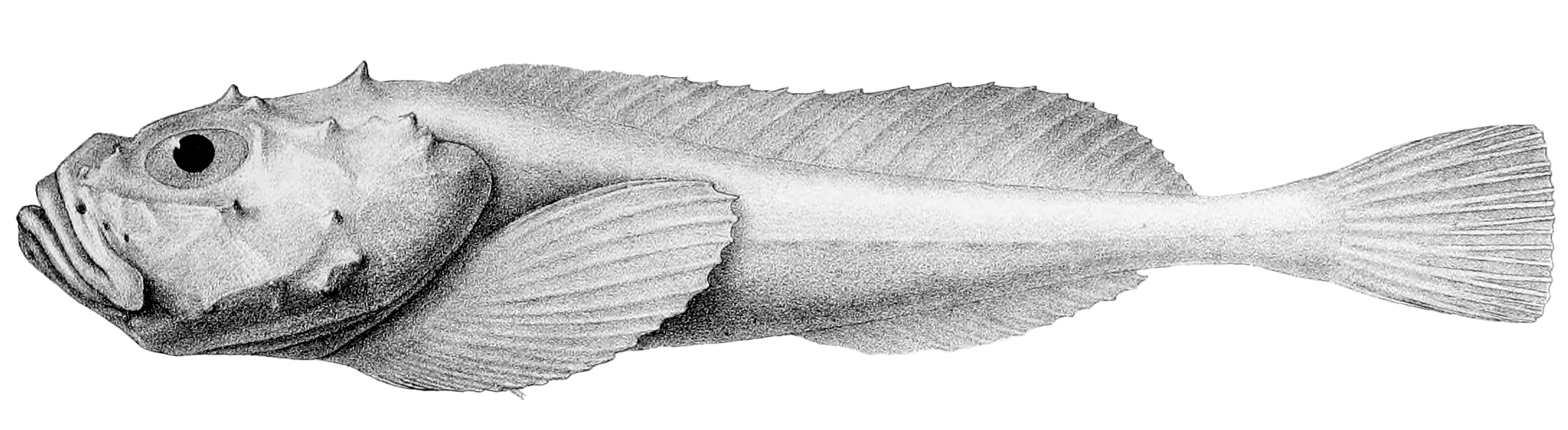

Conservation status
- Least Concern (IUCN 3.1)

Scientific classification
- Kingdom: Animalia
- Phylum: Chordata
- Class: Actinopterygii
- Order: Perciformes
- Suborder: Cottoidei
- Family: Psychrolutidae
- Genus: Cottunculus
- Species: C. thomsonii

Binomial name
- Cottunculus thomsonii (Günther, 1882)

Synonyms
- Cottus thomsonii Günther, 1882; Cottunculus torvus Goode & T. H. Bean, 1883

= Pallid sculpin =

Species of fish

The pallid sculpin (Cottunculus thomsonii) is a species of fish in the family Psychrolutidae (blobfishes).

== Etymology ==
The specific name refers to Charles Wyville Thomson.

== Description ==
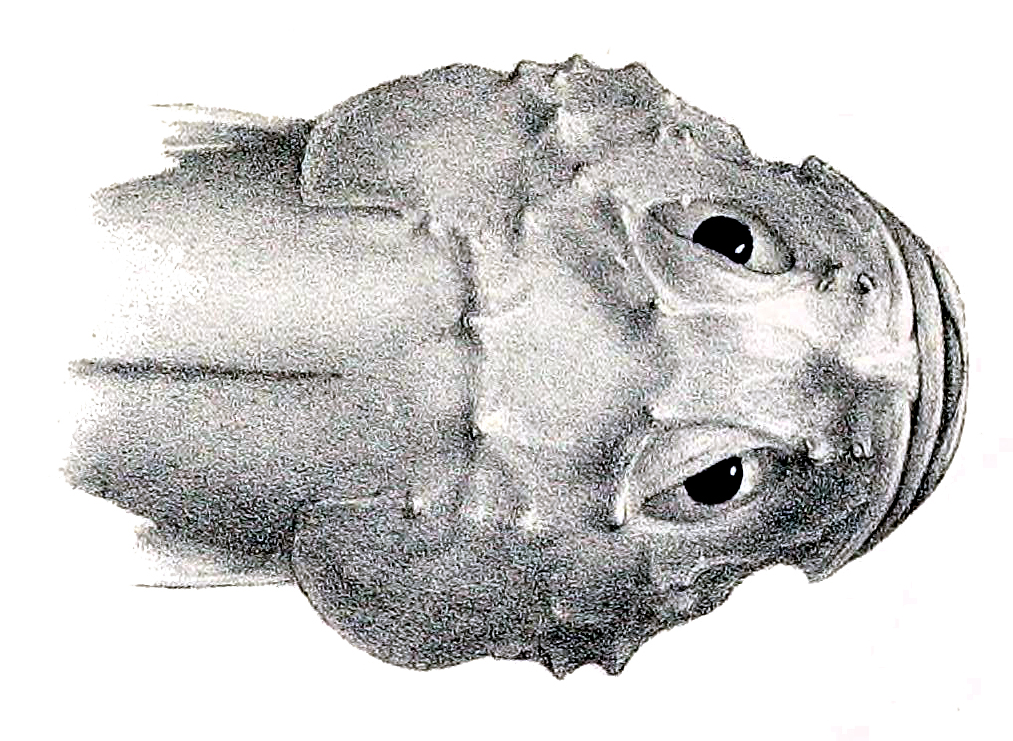
Dorsal view of the pallid sculpin's head

The pallid sculpin is up to 43 cm (17 in) in length and up to 1.4 kg (3.1 lb) in weight. It is greyish-brown in colour.

== Habitat ==
The pallid sculpin is bathydemersal, living at depths of 100–1,600 m (330–5,250 ft) in the North Atlantic Ocean.

== Behaviour ==
Feeds on small invertebrates.
