= Cottunculus tubulosus =

Scientific classification
- Domain: Eukaryota
- Kingdom: Animalia
- Phylum: Chordata
- Class: Actinopterygii
- Order: Perciformes
- Suborder: Cottoidei
- Family: Psychrolutidae
- Genus: Cottunculus
- Species: C. tubulosus

Binomial name
- Cottunculus tubulosus Byrkjedal & Orlov, 2007

Species of fish

Cottunculus tubulosus is a species of fish in the blobfishe family Psychrolutidae. It is found in the north-eastern Atlantic Ocean. It was described in 2007 by Ingvar Byrkjedal and Alexei Markovich Orlov.

== Description ==
This species reaches a length of 4.7 cm (1.9 in).
