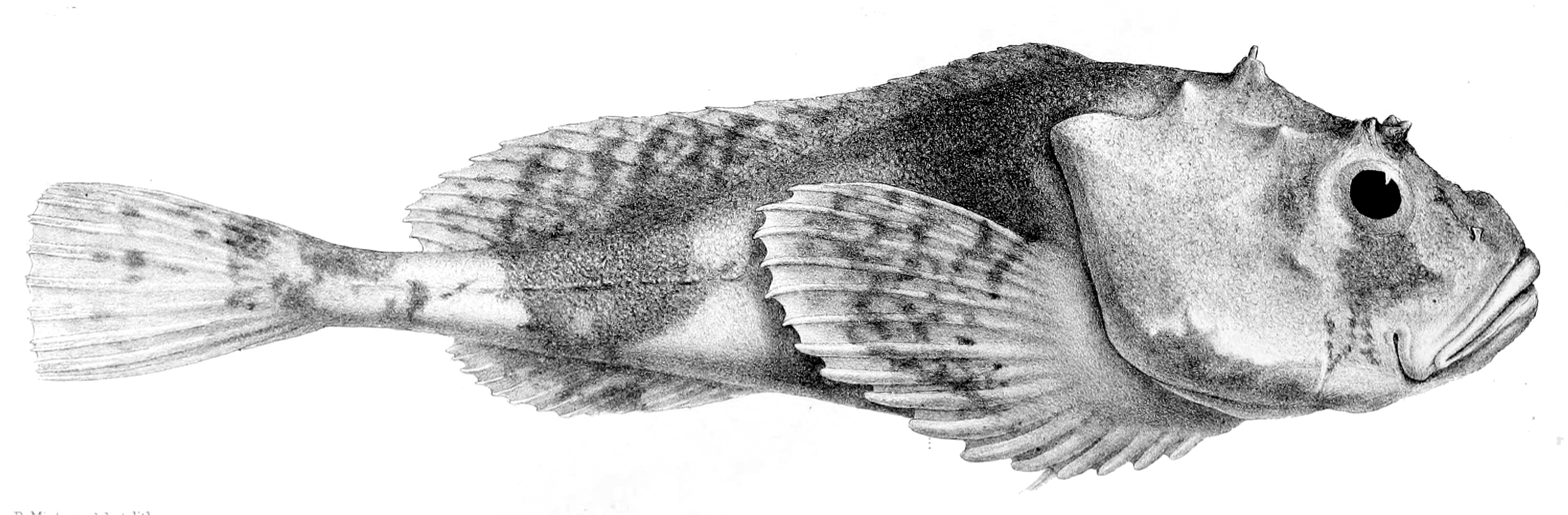
- Cottunculus microps
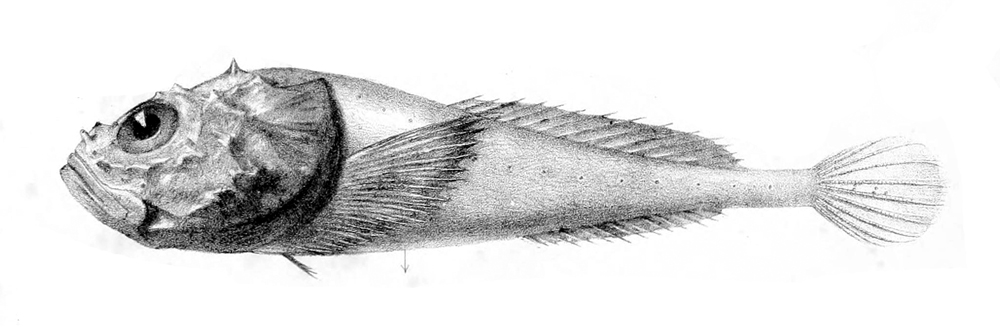
- Cottunculus thomsonii

Scientific classification
- Kingdom: Animalia
- Phylum: Chordata
- Class: Actinopterygii
- Division: Teleostei
- Order: Perciformes
- Suborder: Cottoidei
- Family: Psychrolutidae
- Genus: Cottunculus; Collett, 1875

Type species
- Cottunculus microps Collett, 1875

= Cottunculus =

Genus of fish

Cottunculus is a genus of marine ray-finned fish belonging to the family Psychrolutidae. These fishes are found in the Atlantic, Pacific and Arctic oceans.

== Species ==
There are currently 7 recognized species in this genus:

- Cottunculus granulosus Karrer, 1968 (Fathead)
- Cottunculus microps Collett, 1875 (Polar sculpin)
- Cottunculus nudus J. S. Nelson, 1989 (Bonyskull toadfish)
- Cottunculus spinosus Gilchrist, 1906
- Cottunculus subspinosus Jensen, 1902
- Cottunculus thomsonii (Günther, 1882) (Pallid sculpin)
- Cottunculus tubulosus Byrkjedal & Orlov, 2007

Synoyms

- Cottunculus sadko Essipov, 1937; valid as C. microps
