= Sören Bartol =

German politician

Sören Bartol MdB
- Bartol in 2021

Member of the Bundestag; for Marburg
- Incumbent
- Assumed office 17 October 2002
- Preceded by: Brigitte Lange

Personal details
- Born: 4 September 1974 (age 52) Hamburg, West Germany
- Party: Social Democratic
- Education: Marburg University

Sören Bartol (born 4 September 1974) is a German politician of the Social Democratic Party (SPD) who has been serving as a member of the German Parliament since 2002.

In addition to his parliamentary work, Bartol has been serving as Parliamentary State Secretary at the Federal Ministry for Housing, Urban Development and Building in the coalition government of Chancellor Olaf Scholz (2021–2025) and in the coalition government of Chancellor Friedrich Merz (since 2025).

== Political career ==
Bartol has been a member of the German Bundestag since the 2002 federal election, representing the electoral district of Marburg.

In the negotiations to form a Grand Coalition of Chancellor Angela Merkel's Christian Democrats (CDU together with the Bavarian CSU) and the SPD following the 2013 federal elections, Bartol was part of the SPD delegation in the working group on transport, building and infrastructure, led by Peter Ramsauer and Florian Pronold.

From 2013 until 2021, Bartol served as deputy chairman of the SPD parliamentary group under the leadership of successive chairpersons Thomas Oppermann (2013–2017), Andrea Nahles (2017–2019) and Rolf Mützenich (2019–2021). In the negotiations to form a fourth coalition government under Merkel following the 2017 federal elections, he again led the working group on transport and infrastructure, this time alongside Thomas Strobl and Alexander Dobrindt.

Bartol is a member of the Parliamentary Friendship Group for Relations with the States of Central America, the Parliamentary Friendship Group for Relations with the States of South America – which is in charge of maintaining inter-parliamentary relations with Argentina, Bolivia, Chile, Ecuador, Guyana, Colombia, Paraguay, Peru, Suriname, Uruguay, Venezuela – and the German-Brazilian Parliamentary Friendship Group.

== Other activities ==
=== Corporate boards ===
- KfW, Member of the Board of Supervisory Directors (2018–2021)
- INOSOFT AG, Member of the Supervisory Board (–2013)

=== Non-profit organizations ===
- Business Forum of the Social Democratic Party of Germany, Member of the Political Advisory Board (since 2020)
- Evangelical Church of Hesse Electorate-Waldeck School Foundation, Member of the Board (since 2005)
- Gegen Vergessen – Für Demokratie, Member
- Federal Foundation of Baukultur, Member of the Board of Trustees (2009–2012)
- Federal Network Agency for Electricity, Gas, Telecommunications, Post and Railway (BNetzA), Member of the Rail Infrastructure Advisory Council (2009–2014)
- German United Services Trade Union (ver.di), Member
