= Guerrino Boatto =

Italian Artist

Guerrino Boatto (Codroipo March 5, 1946 - Venice April 22, 2018) was an Italian illustrator and painter, specialized in Airbrush or spray painting.

== Early life ==
Boatto was born in Codroipo, Udine, Italy, the son of a rail engineer. In 1949 his family moved to Venice, where he studied art at the Art School of Venice (Liceo Artistico Statale "Michelangelo Guggenheim") until 1969 and industrial design at the Venice's University IUAV until 1971. His uncle, Louis Bosa (his mother’s elder brother), himself an artist who was exhibited at Metropolitan Museum of Art - New York and Whitney Museum of American Art - New York among others, encouraged his family to allow Boatto to pursue a career in painting.

== Career ==
Boatto started his career as an art director with an advertising company, but soon after left for the United States, where he went to San Francisco to attend the Academy of Art College. After graduation he turned down a teaching position in favour of moving back to Venice and starting a new career as a painter. Initially he provided art for advertising billboards.

During his career as an illustrator, he created art works for several companies including Barilla, Coca-Cola, Fiat, Ford, IBM, Levi's, Volkswagen, Zanussi, Lamborghini, Mercedes-Benz, Nestlé, Pirelli, Sony and Swatch.

Guerrino Boatto is represented by Hilary Bradford and Ass. in Italy, Margarethe Hubauer in Germany and ICO HQ Publishing House (Japan) ICO HQ in Japan.

In 2000, Boatto was awarded the Gold Award for design and illustration in Venice, Italy by the then rector of the Art School of Venice (Liceo Artistico Statale "Michelangelo Guggenheim"), from which he graduated in 1969.

== Style ==
For most of his career, Boatto worked predominantly with airbrush, finishing with pastels, markers or oil ink. During the course of his career he largely abandoned commercial airbrush works in favor of more artistic ones. Boatto's illustration work is generally considered to be in the hyperrealistic style.

In 2009 Boatto's work appeared on the cover of Aero Art Action Magazine (#pdf).

He cited Walt Disney as an influence.

While he continued to live and work in Venice, a progressive illness slowed down his activities starting in 1998. He died on April 22, 2018, while he was being treated at the hospital in Venice, assisted by his adopted son.

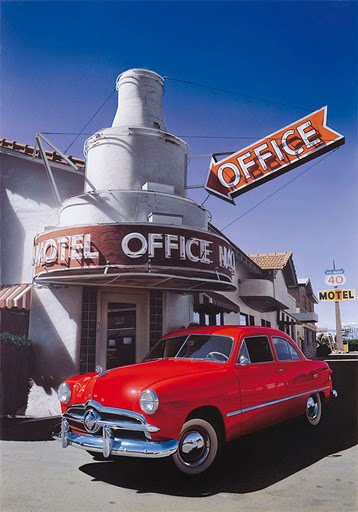
Motel Office, Acrylic on board, 100x70, 1987.

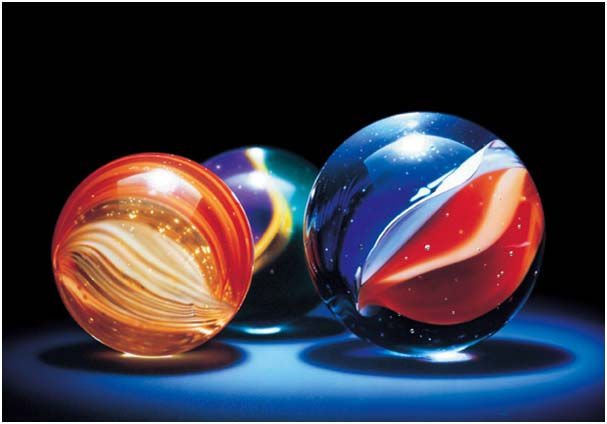
Marbles, one of the G.Boatto icons; Acrylic on board, 70x100, 1985.

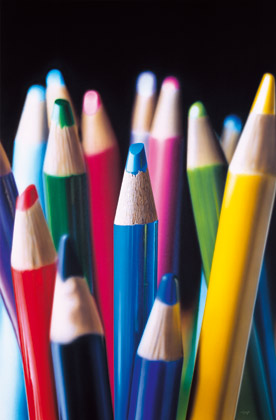
Pencils, another G.Boatto icon; Acrylic on board, 70x50, 1989.

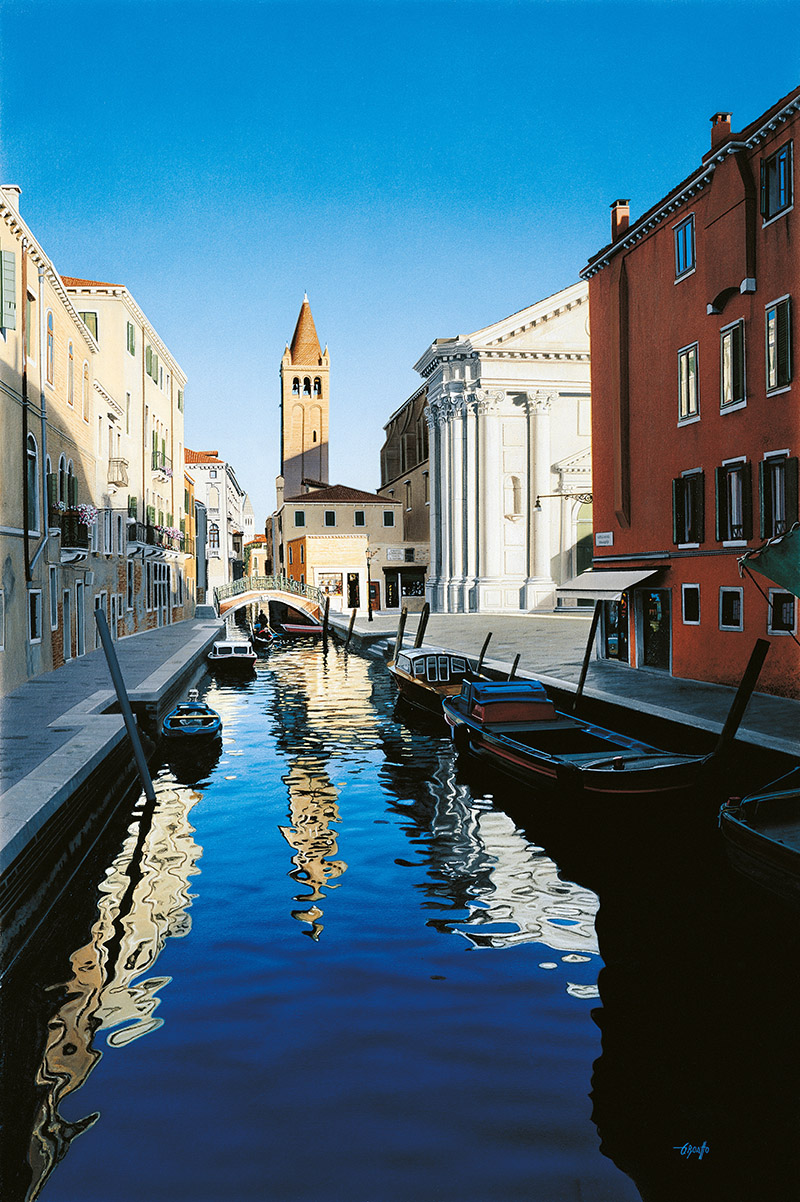
One of the G.Boatto works on Venice: San Barnaba church and canal; Acrylic on canvas, 100x70, 2004.

== Commercial works for advertisement ==
Golia. Art Directors Club Italiano: 1986

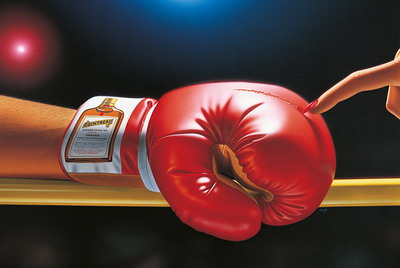
Cointreau Italia. Art Directors Club Italiano: 1987

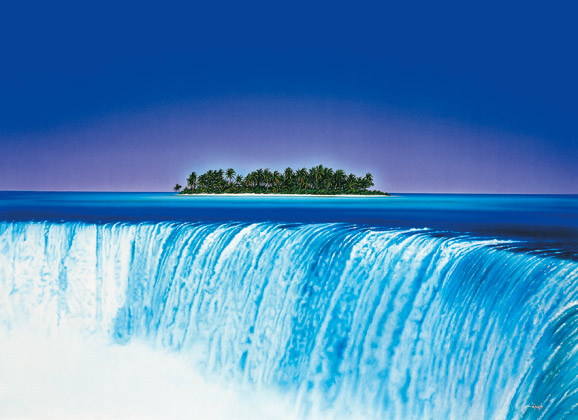
UNICEF. Art Directors Club Italiano: 1990
