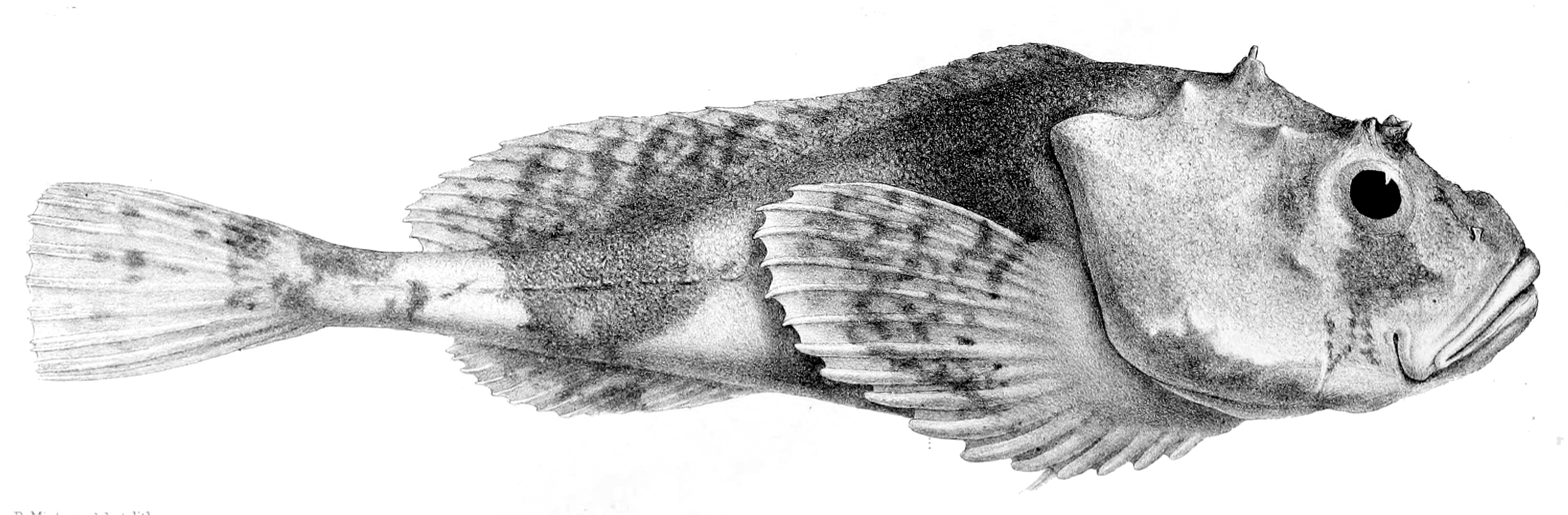

Conservation status
- Data Deficient (IUCN 3.1)

Scientific classification
- Kingdom: Animalia
- Phylum: Chordata
- Class: Actinopterygii
- Division: Teleostei
- Order: Perciformes
- Suborder: Cottoidei
- Family: Psychrolutidae
- Genus: Cottunculus
- Species: C. microps

Binomial name
- Cottunculus microps Collett, 1875

Synonyms
- Cottunculus konstantinovi Myagkov, 1991; Cottunculus sadko Essipov, 1937

= Cottunculus microps =

Species of fish

Cottunculus microps, the polar sculpin, is a species of fathead sculpin, a deepwater fish found in the North Atlantic and Arctic Oceans. It was first described in 1875 by the Norwegian zoologist Robert Collett, curator of the Natural History Museum at the University of Oslo.

== Description ==
Like other members of its family, the polar sculpin has a large head, a short tapering body and a small tail. The skin is loosely attached and there is a gelatinous layer beneath it. This fish has a maximum length of about 30 cm (12 in) but a more usual length is between 9 and 14 cm (3.5 and 5.5 in). The head is rounded when viewed from above; its width is usually greater than its length. There are four rounded bony knobs behind and between the eyes and the skin is very rough. The colour of this fish is greyish-brown and there are three or four broad, dark-coloured vertical bands on the sides of the body. The dorsal fin has about 7 spines and 14 soft rays and the anal fin 10 to 11 soft rays. The pectoral fins are pale-coloured with a few dark spots and have 17 to 19 soft rays.

== Distribution and habitat ==
The polar sculpin is native to the North Atlantic Ocean and the Arctic Ocean. In the western Atlantic it is found from New Jersey in the United States northward to the Gulf of Saint Lawrence in Canada and Greenland. In the eastern Atlantic it is found in the English Channel, the North Sea, Norway, the Barents Sea, Svalbard, the Faroe Islands and Iceland. It is a demersal, deep sea fish found near the sea bed at depths ranging between 165 and 1,340 m (540 and 4,400 ft), but mostly no deeper than 215 m (700 ft).

== Ecology ==
The polar sculpin is a demersal fish and feeds on various invertebrates that live on the seabed including polychaete worms, amphipods, mysid shrimps, sea spiders and other crustaceans. The life history of this fish is little known; females have been caught containing 124 to 220 nearly ripe eggs, each measuring up to 4.5 mm (0.2 in) in diameter. It is likely that like some of its close relatives, the eggs of the polar sculpin develop on the seabed and the larvae may also be demersal.
