= Lilli Jahn =

German Jewish doctor known for posthumously published letters documenting the Holocaust

- Born: Lilli Schlüchterer; 5 March 1900; Germany
- Died: c. 19 June 1944 (aged 44); Auschwitz concentration camp, Oświęcim, Poland
- Occupation: Medical doctor
- Children: 5 (including Gerhard Jahn)

Lilli Jahn (née Schlüchterer; 5 March 1900 – c. 19 June 1944) was a German-Jewish medical doctor and victim of Nazism in Germany. She gained international fame posthumously following the publication of her letters to her five children which she wrote during her imprisonment in the Breitenau concentration camp. She was deported to the Auschwitz concentration camp and was murdered there.

== Life ==
=== Childhood and education ===
Lilli Jahn was born as Lilli Schlüchterer, daughter of a wealthy tradesman who lived in Cologne as a liberal assimilated Jew. She got a quite progressive education for a girl at that time: She was taking her A-levels in 1919 at Kaiserin-Augusta-School in Cologne and started after that studying medicine in Würzburg, Halle (Saale), Freiburg im Breisgau and Cologne. 1924 Lilli finished her studies successfully and got her conferral of a doctorate with a thesis. Firstly she worked on a temporary employment at a doctor's practice and the Israelitisches Asyl für Kranke und Altersschwache in Cologne. After 1933, when the Nazi Party controlled the country, Lilli Jahn was not allowed to continue practicing as a medical doctor.

=== Imprisonment in Breitenau ===
At the end of August 1943, Lilli Jahn was denounced. She had omitted to add the name 'Sara' – obligatory for all female Jews – on her doorbell, but left the doctor’s degree, which was forbidden for Jews. She was arrested, interrogated and due to a violation of the name change ordinance, was sent to the Breitenau concentration camp near Guxhagen, south of Kassel. Her underage children were left to themselves more or less. Initially, Jahn worked as a forced labourer in the pharmaceutical factory of B. Braun in Melsungen. Her daughter Ilse managed to visit her already weakened mother during her arrest only once. Until today it has remained unclear to what extent Ernst Jahn tried to save the life of his ex-wife by pleas to the responsible Gestapo in Kassel or the Reich Security Main Office in Berlin.

=== Deportation to Auschwitz and death ===
In March 1944, Lilli Jahn was deported in a collective transport via Dresden to Auschwitz concentration camp. Prior to her deportation she managed to smuggle her children's letters out of Breitenau: they ended up at her son's, who kept them without the knowledge of his sisters until his death in 1998. The last preserved letter by Lilli Jahn from Auschwitz dated 6 March 1944, was written by someone else. Her children got the message of her mother's death in September 1944 in Immenhausen.

=== Remembrance ===
In memory of Lilli Jahn, the municipality of Guxhagen renamed the square in front of the former synagogue to Lilli-Jahn-Platz in 1976.

Her son Gerhard Jahn became Federal Minister of Justice in Germany in 1969.
