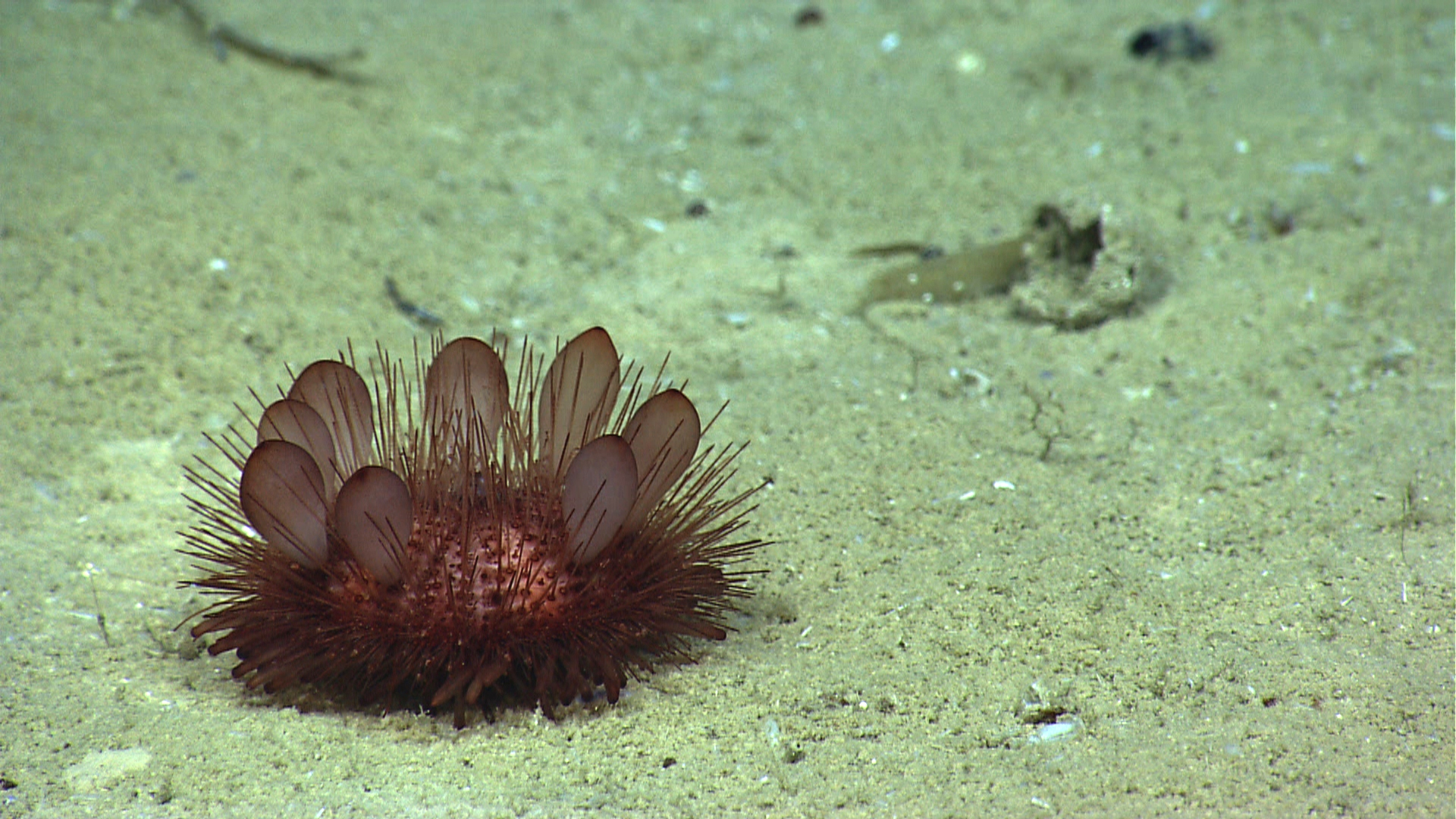
- Phormosoma placenta

Scientific classification
- Kingdom: Animalia
- Phylum: Echinodermata
- Class: Echinoidea
- Order: Echinothurioida
- Family: Phormosomatidae; Mortensen, 1934

= Phormosomatidae =

Family of sea urchins

Phormosomatidae is a family of echinoderms belonging to the order Echinothurioida.

The family was described in 1934 by Ole Theodor Jensen Mortensen.

Species from the family Phormosomatidae are found in both the Indo-Pacific and the Atlantic.

Species from this family are distinguished from the Echinothuriidae, by their polyporous ambulacral plates, their adoral spines which lack a terminal 'hoof' and acuminate teeth, but have a lantern which is similar to species of the Echinothuriidae.

Genera:

- Hemiphormosoma Mortensen, 1934
- Paraphormosoma Mortensen, 1934
- Phormosoma Thomson, 1872
