= Stefan Heck =

German politician (born 1982)

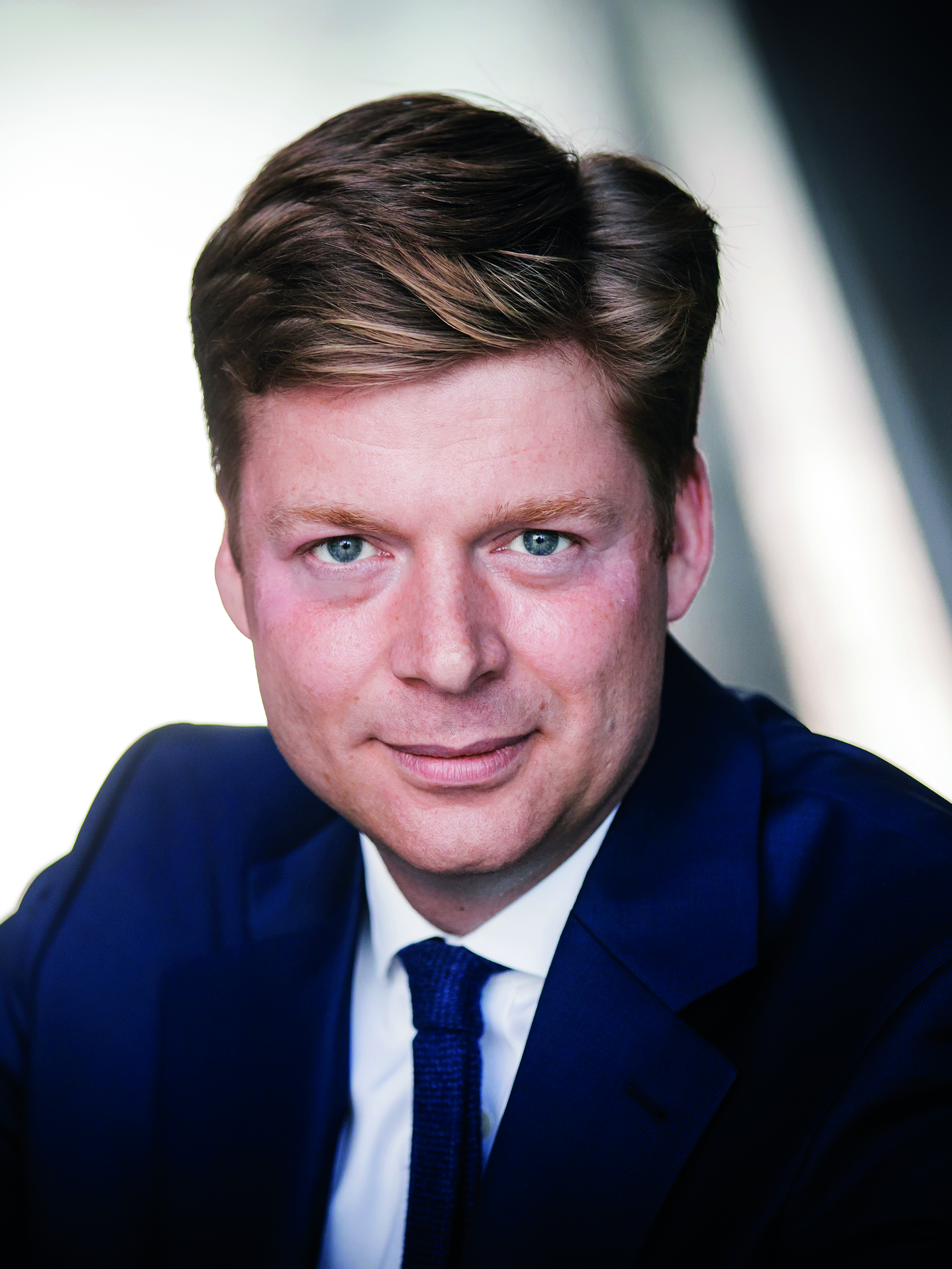

Member of Bundestag
- In office October 22, 2013 – October 24, 2017

Secretary of state in the Hessian Ministry of the Interior and Sports
- In office January 2019 – October 2021

Personal details
- Born: 18 August 1982 (age 43) Marburg, Germany
- Party: CDU
- Education: University of Marburg
- Occupation: Politician
- Website: https://www.stefan-heck.net/

Stefan Heck (born 18 August 1982 in Marburg) is a German lawyer and politician of the Christian Democratic Union (CDU) who has been a Member of the German Bundestag from 2013 to 2017 and again since 2021. From January 2019 to October 2021, Heck was Secretary of state in the Hessian State Ministry of the Interior and Sports.

== Early life and career ==
Heck was born 1982 in the West German city of Marburg and studied law to become a lawyer. After graduating from the St. Johann Amöneburg Collegiate School in 2002, Heck completed his military service and subsequent training as a reserve officer. From 2003 to 2007, he studied law in Marburg and Kraków, graduating in 2007 with the first state law examination and subsequently working as a research assistant to Steffen Detterbeck at the Institute for Public Law at the University of Marburg until 2013. From 2011 to 2012, he was a legal trainee in Frankfurt, Marburg and Speyer. In 2011, he also returned to Kraków and completed an LL.M. degree there. In 2012, he graduated from Marburg with a dissertation on Mandate and Transparency. Display and Publication of Extra-Parliamentary Professional Activities of Members of the German Bundestag.

In 2013, Heck passed the second state law examination and worked as an attorney at the international law firm Graf von Westphalen in Frankfurt am Main from March.

== Political career ==
Heck has been a member of the municipal council of the town of Amöneburg since 2001 and its chairman since 2011. Since 2006, he has also represented the CDU in the district council in Marburg-Biedenkopf. In 2013, he was elected state chairman of the Junge Union Hessen and remained so until 2019.

=== Member of the German Parliament, 2013–2017 ===
Having already run unsuccessfully in the 2009 Bundestag election in the Marburg Bundestag constituency, Heck entered the Bundestag in 2013 via 12th place on the CDU state list for Hesse. In the German Bundestag, he was a full member of the Committee on Election Scrutiny, Immunity and Rules of Procedure and the Committee on Legal Affairs and Consumer Protection. In the 2017 Bundestag election, he missed the entry into the Bundestag. According to daily newspaper Die Welt, his departure was considered "internally as perhaps the most bitter loss" in the CDU/CSU parliamentary group.

=== Career in state government ===
After leaving the German Parliament, Heck became managing director of the copyright collective VG Media in 2017.

Following his second election into the German Parliament, Heck resigned as state secretary. He was replaced as state secretary by Stefan Sauer.

=== Member of the German Parliament, 2021–present ===
In the 2021 Bundestag election, Heck was elected to the German Bundestag via position 7 on the Hessian CDU state list.

Since December 2016, Heck has been a member of the CDU federal executive committee.

== Writings ==
- "Mandate and transparency : notification and publication of sideline activities of members of the Bundestag." Frankfurt, M.: PL Acad. Research 2014 (Schriften zum deutschen und europäischen öffentlichen Recht 27) ISBN 978-3-631-63788-3 Accessed: Marburg, Univ., Diss., 2012.

== See also ==
- German politics
