= Julian Schmidt (politician) =

German politician (born 1989)

Member of the Bundestag
- Incumbent
- Assumed office March 2025
- Constituency: Hesse

Personal details
- Born: 10 December 1989 (age 36)
- Party: Alternative for Germany (since 2013)

Julian Schmidt (born 10 December 1989) is a German politician who was elected as a member of the Bundestag in 2025. He is the chairman of the Alternative for Germany in Marburg-Biedenkopf.

In November 2025 he was assaulted by a group of leftists who were opposed to the creation of Generation Germany, the AfD's new youth wing.
