= Gerhard Jahn =

German politician (1927–1998)

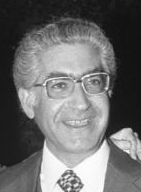
- Jahn in 1972

Minister of Justice
- In office 22 October 1969 – 7 May 1974
- Chancellor: Willy Brandt
- Preceded by: Horst Ehmke
- Succeeded by: Hans-Jochen Vogel

Member of the Bundestag; from Hesse
- In office 15 October 1957 – 20 December 1990
- Constituency: See list: State list (1957–1961); Marburg (1961–1965); State list (1965–1969); Marburg (1969–1983); State list (1983–1990)

Personal details
- Born: 10 September 1927 Kassel, Germany
- Died: 20 October 1998 (aged 71) Marburg, Germany
- Party: Social Democratic
- Children: 3
- Parent: Lilli Jahn (mother)
- Education: Friedrichsgymnasium Kassel; Marburg University
- Profession: Lawyer, politician

Gerhard Jahn (10 September 1927 – 20 October 1998) was a German politician and a member of the Social Democratic Party of Germany (SPD). He was Parliamentary Secretary to the Minister for Foreign Affairs from 1967 to 1969, and Federal Minister of Justice from 1969 to 1974.

== Early life ==
Jahn was born on 10 September 1927, at Kassel, Germany, to Ernst and Lilli Jahn, a couple of medical practitioners. Together with four younger siblings, he stayed with his mother after his parents divorced in 1942. His mother, a German Jew, had been banned from her medical occupation since the Nazi take-over, and lost her and the children's home during a bombing raid in 1943. The Nazis then subjected Lilli Jahn to forced labour, and sent her to Auschwitz in 1944, where she died in July after three months. After his mother was deported, Gerhard and his siblings lived with their father and his new wife.

Gerhard Jahn studied at a grammar school (Humanistisches Gymnasium), before the Second World War. During the war, he was drafted as an airforce auxiliary manning anti-aircraft guns in 1943–44, and later sent to the Reichsarbeitsdienst. After the war, he worked in a job in the food office of the local town hall.

== Education and law career ==
After graduating from school with Abitur in 1947, he studied law at the University of Marburg. In the same year, he joined the Social Democratic Party of Germany (SPD), and became an active member while at the university. He took multiple jobs to support himself. In 1949, he was elected leader of the student movement of the SPD, the Sozialistischer Deutscher Studentenbund (SDS). Since 1950, he held the office of a secretary of the local SPD group Marburg-Frankenberg. He graduated from Marburg University. In 1956 he qualified as a lawyer, and began practicing law.

== Political offices ==
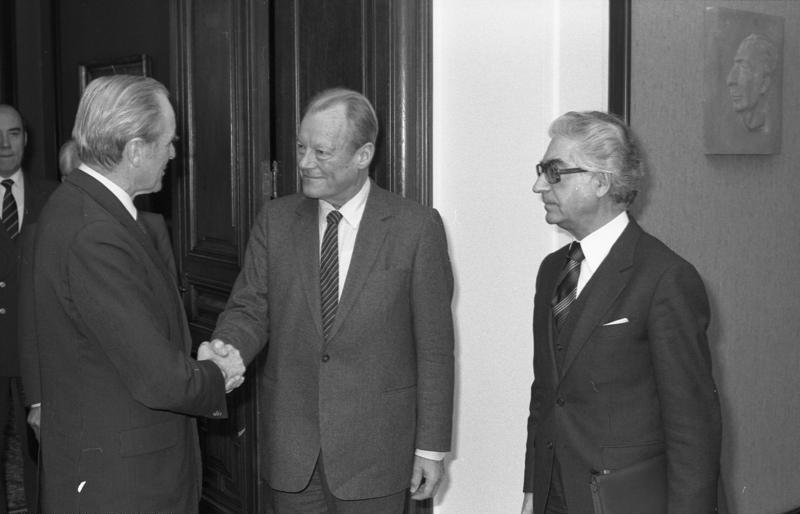
Gerhard Jahn (right) with Willy Brandt and Karl Carstens

Jahn was elected to the Federal German parliament, Bundestag, in 1957, where he was a member until 1990. He served on various parliamentary committees at the Bundestag. In 1960 he was elected to chair committee on restitution in the public service. Alfred Frenzel, who was Jahn's predecessor was exposed as a KGB spy. He represented the SPD in various legal cases.

In addition to his federal offices, he was chairmen of the SPD-fraction of the Marburg town parliament since 1962.

In 1963, while Jahn was a member of the parliamentary committee for defense, he involved himself in a scandal by handing over a confidential document to the press, which proved that the former minister for defense, Franz Josef Strauß, had knowingly made untrue statements.

Jahn was Parliamentary State Secretary to Minister for Foreign Affairs Willy Brandt from 1967 to 1969. When Brandt became Chancellor of Germany in 1969, he selected Jahn as Federal Minister of Justice. While in this position, he initiated reforms of the laws on marriage and divorce as well as on abortion. On the latter issue, Jahn favoured a modified legalising abortion in several exceptional cases - the so-called Indikationsregelung, but his cabinet colleagues insisted on a general legalisation during the first trimester. This Fristenregelung was passed by parliament but was later held up by the Constitutional Court, so that Jahn's position eventually prevailed. Jahn decided to withdraw from the office when chancellor Brandt resigned in 1974.

=== Other positions ===
Jahn was founding chairman of the German–Israeli Society (Deutsch-Israelische Gesellschaft) in 1966, and president of the German Lessee Union (Deutscher Mieterbund) from 1979 to 1995.

== Later life ==
After Jahn left his position of Minister of Justice, he continued to work in the parliamentary committees, and became the managing director of the SPD-fraction. He served as West German representative to the United Nations Human Rights Commission twice (1975–77 and 1979–82).

He was one of the signatories of the agreement to convene a convention for drafting a world constitution. As a result, for the first time in human history, a World Constituent Assembly convened to draft and adopt the Constitution for the Federation of Earth.

== Death ==
Jahn died from cancer on 20 October 1998.
