= Charles Wyville Thomson =

Scottish natural historian and marine zoologist; pioneer of oceanography

Sir Charles Wyville Thomson FRSE FRS FLS FGS FZS
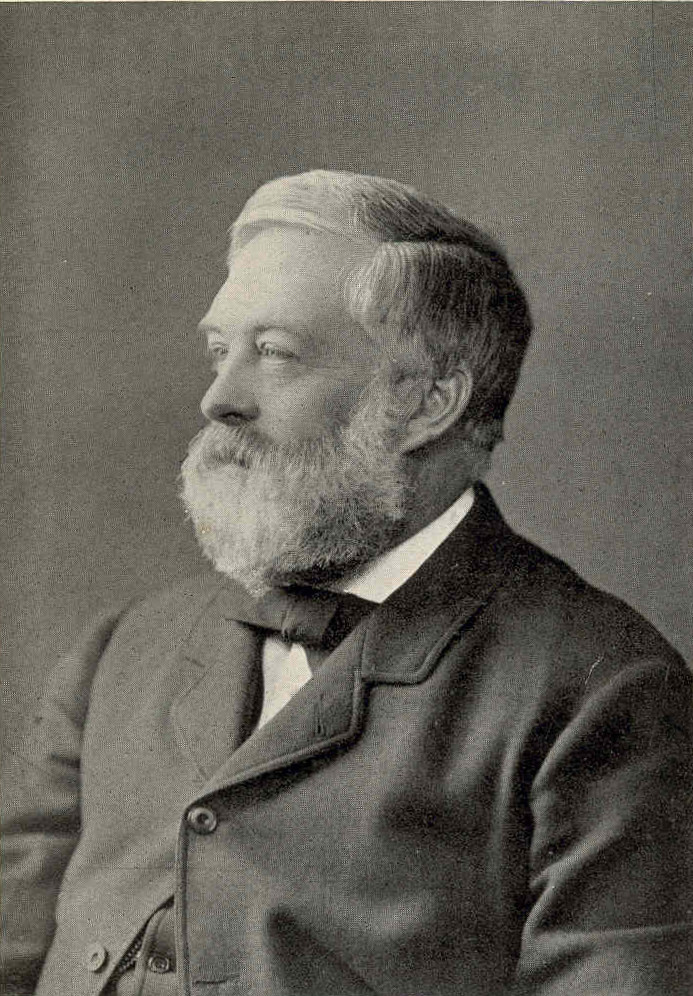
- Undated photograph of Thomson
- Born: Wyville Thomas Charles Thomson; 5 March 1830; Linlithgow, Scotland
- Died: 10 March 1882 (aged 52); Linlithgow, Scotland
- Education: Merchiston Castle School; University of Edinburgh
- Known for: Challenger expedition
- Awards: Royal Medal (1876); Knight of the Order of the Polar Star (Sweden, 1877)
- Scientific career
- Fields: Marine zoology
- Institutions: University of Aberdeen (1850–1851); Marischal College (1851–1852); Queen's College, Cork; Queen's University of Belfast

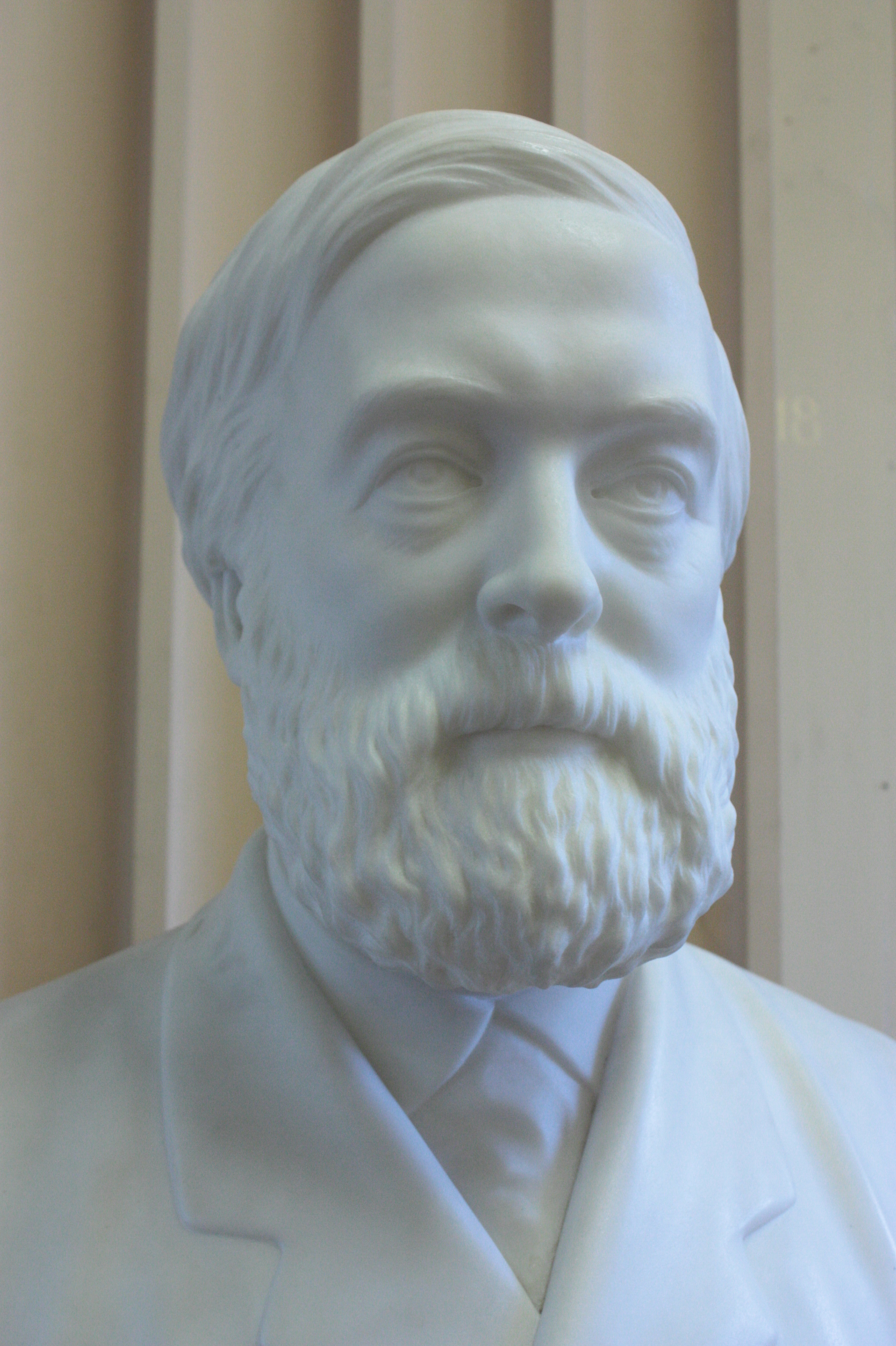
Bust of Thomson by John Hutchison

Sir Charles Wyville Thomson FRSE FRS FLS FGS FZS (5 March 1830 – 10 March 1882) was a Scottish natural historian and marine zoologist. He served as the chief scientist on the Challenger expedition; his work there revolutionized oceanography and led to his being knighted.

== Life ==
Thomson was born at Bonsyde, in Linlithgow, West Lothian, on 5 March 1830, the son of Andrew Thomson, a surgeon in the service of the East India Company, and his wife Sarah Ann Drummond Smith. He was baptised Wyville Thomas Charles Thomson, but changed his name formally upon being knighted in 1876.

He was educated under Charles Chalmers at Merchiston Castle School, then from 1845 studied medicine at the University of Edinburgh graduating with an MD. However, his focus turned from medicine to natural science, and he joined the Botanical Society of Edinburgh in 1847, and soon after became secretary to the Royal Physical Society of Edinburgh. In 1850 he was attending the botany class of John Hutton Balfour at the university.

In 1850 he was appointed lecturer of botany, and in 1851 professor of botany, at the University of Aberdeen. In 1853 he became a professor of natural history in Queen's College, Cork, Ireland, succeeding Professor Hincks. A year later he was nominated to the chair of mineralogy and geology at the Queen's University of Belfast.

In 1855 he was elected a Fellow of the Royal Society of Edinburgh, his proposer being his former tutor, John Hutton Balfour. He served as the society's vice president from 1877 to 1882. He was elected a Fellow of the Royal Society of London in 1869.

In 1860 was transferred to the chair of natural history at the same institution. In 1868 he assumed the duties of professor of botany at the Royal College of Science, Dublin, and finally in 1870 he received the natural history chair at the University of Edinburgh. Here he taught Arthur Conan Doyle.

In 1871–72 he served as President of the Botanical Society of Edinburgh.

== Interests ==
Thomson is remembered for his studies of the biological conditions of the deep seas. Being interested in crinoids, and prompted by the results of the dredgings of Michael Sars in the deep sea off the Norwegian coasts, he persuaded the Royal Navy to grant him use of HMS Lightning and HMS Porcupine for deep sea dredging expeditions in the summers of 1868 and 1869. They showed that animal life existed down to depths of 650 fathoms (1200 m), that all marine invertebrate groups are present at this depth, and that deep-sea temperatures are not as constant as had been supposed, but vary considerably, and indicate oceanic circulation. These results were described in The Depths of the Sea, which he published in 1873.

== Challenger expedition ==
The remarkable hydrographic and zoological results which Thomson had demonstrated, in addition to the growing demands of ocean telegraphy, soon led to the Royal Navy to grant use of HMS Challenger for a global expedition. Wyville Thomson was selected as chief scientist, and the ship sailed on 23 December 1872.

== Aftermath ==
The Challenger expedition was deemed a great success, and on his return Thomson received a number of academic honours, as well as a knighthood. In 1877 he published in two volumes The Voyage of the Challenger – The Atlantic, a preliminary account of the results of the voyage. He spent the next two years working on administrative duties connected with the publication of the full monograph of the voyage. Thomson had a highly strung mentality, and his health was generally poor throughout his life. He found dealing with publishers in the course of completing the full reports of the voyage to be enormously stressful. In 1879 he ceased to perform his university duties, gave up overseeing the reports of the expedition in 1881 (after publishing the introduction to the zoological series in 1880), then took to his bed and died a broken man at Bonsyde on 10 March 1882. Thomson's friend and colleague Sir John Murray took over the publication of the reports; they eventually spanned 50 volumes, the last of which was issued in 1895.

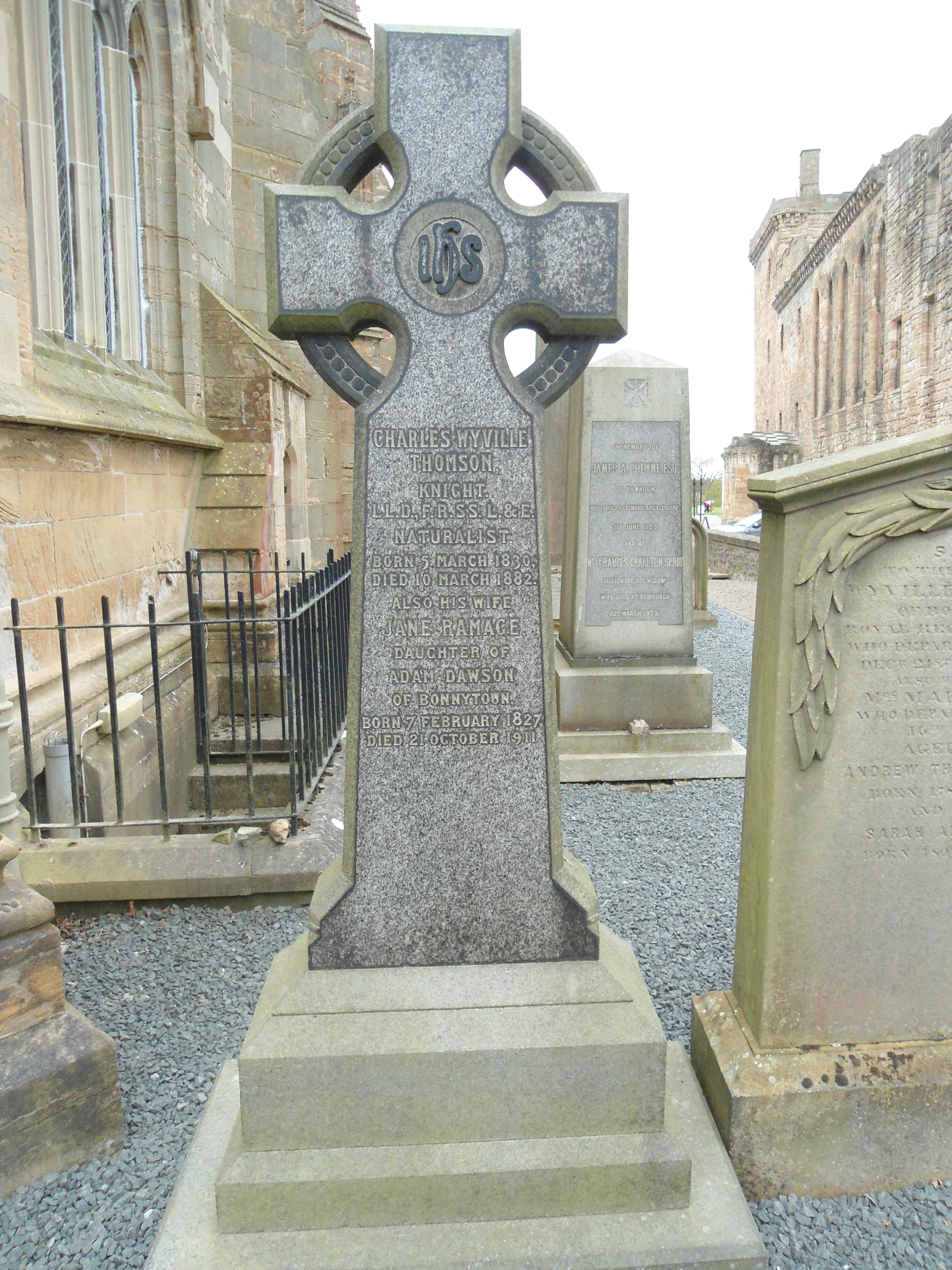
Thomson's headstone in St. Michael's Parish Churchyard.

Thomson is commemorated in the stained glass window above the altar in St. Michael's Parish Church, Linlithgow and his headstone is in the churchyard. In addition the Wyville Thomson Ridge in the North Atlantic Ocean is named after him.

== Evolution ==
Thomson had criticised natural selection, stating it was not enough to explain the evolution of species. Replying in the Nature journal, Charles Darwin commented that "I am sorry to find that Sir Wyville Thomson does not under stand the principle of natural selection, as explained by Mr. Wallace and myself... Can Sir Wyville Thomson name any one who has said that the evolution of species depends only on natural selection?"

== Publications ==
- Thomson, C. W. (1873). The Depths of the Sea: an Account of the General Results of the Dredging Cruises of H.M.SS. 'Porcupine' and 'Lightning' during the Summers of 1868, 1869, and 1870, under the Scientific Direction of Dr. Carpenter, F.R.S., J. Gwyn Jeffreys, F.R.S., and Dr. Wyville Thomson, F.R.S. London: Macmillan and Company. OCLC 11577765. OL 7246945M.
- —— (1877). The Voyage of the "Challenger" – The Atlantic, a Preliminary Account of the General Results of the Exploring Voyage of H.M.S. "Challenger" during the Year 1873 and the Early Part of the Year 1876. London: Macmillan and Company. doi:10.5962/bhl.title.79255. OCLC 4031714.
- Thomson, C. W.; Murray, J., eds. (1880–1895). Report of the Scientific Results of the Voyage of H.M.S. Challenger during the Years 1873–1876, under the Command of Captain George S. Nares, R.N., F.R.S., and Captain Frank Tourle Thomson R.N. Her Majesty's Stationery Office. doi:10.5962/bhl.title.6513. OCLC 10354084.

== Family ==
In 1853 he married Jane Ramage Dawson. They were parents to Frank Wyville Thomson FRSE (1860–1918).

== Taxon named in his honor ==
The Pallid sculpin, Cottunculus thomsonii (Günther, 1882), is named after him.

== See also ==
- European and American voyages of scientific exploration
