= Fire urchin =

Fire urchin may refer to one of several sea urchins including:

- Astropyga radiata
- Asthenosoma ijimai
- Asthenosoma marisrubri
- Asthenosoma varium
