= Allopontonia brockii =

Scientific classification
- Kingdom: Animalia
- Phylum: Arthropoda
- Clade: Pancrustacea
- Class: Malacostraca
- Order: Decapoda
- Suborder: Pleocyemata
- Infraorder: Caridea
- Family: Palaemonidae
- Genus: Allopontonia
- Species: A. brockii

Binomial name
- Allopontonia brockii (de Man, 1888)

Synonyms
- Allopontonia iani Bruce, 1972; Anchistia brockii de Man, 1888; Periclimenes signatus Kemp, 1925; Periclimenes priodactylus Bruce, 1992

Species of crustacean

Allopontonia brockii is a small commensal shrimp in the family Palaemonidae.

== Description ==
This species of shrimp can be easily confused with Allogalathea elegans (crinoid squat lobster) due to its long chelipeds, the visible shape of its cephalothorax, its abdomen slightly curved under the body and by its colours. However, Allopontonia brockii differs in several points from Allogalathea elegans:

- its rostrum is ridged, sharp and notched,
- its chelipeds are smooth without spines. The body coloration varies from light yellow to orange–red with a wide whitish longitudinal stripe sometimes lined with a dark border. It reaches a maximum length of 1 centimetre (0.4 in).

== Distribution ==
Allopontonia brockii is widespread through the Indo-Pacific, Red Sea included, and the eastern coast of the Pacific Ocean.

== Ecology ==
Allopontonia brockii is considered as a commensal species from different species of sea urchins like some of the genus Salmaciella, Salmacis, Asthenosoma or Pseudoboletiana. However, Allopontonia brockii can usually be observed on Asthenosoma varium (fire sea urchin). Allopontonia brockii takes advantage of its host when it moves on the substratum to collect its food during the way and also takes benefit of the potential food which can hang onto the sea urchin.
