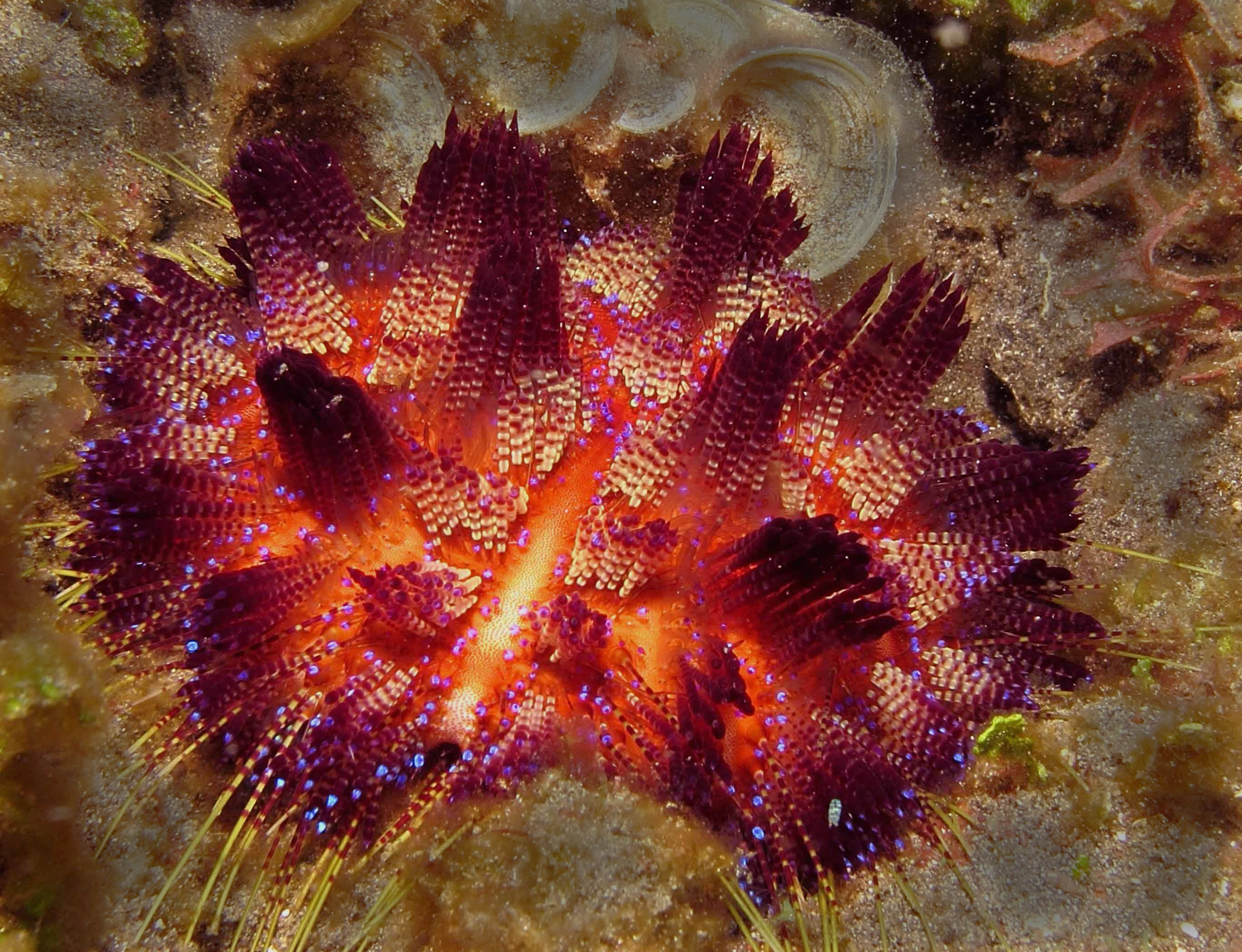

Scientific classification
- Domain: Eukaryota
- Kingdom: Animalia
- Phylum: Echinodermata
- Class: Echinoidea
- Order: Echinothurioida
- Family: Echinothuriidae
- Genus: Asthenosoma
- Species: A. varium

Binomial name
- Asthenosoma varium (Grube, 1868)

= Asthenosoma varium =

Species of sea urchin

Asthenosoma varium is a sea urchin (an echinoderm, a member of the phylum that also includes star fish). Growing up to 25 cm (10 in) in diameter, it lives on sand and rubble sea bottoms in the Indo-Pacific, from the Red Sea to Australia and Southern Japan. Its venom tipped spines, with distinctive globular swellings below the tip, can inflict a painful sting if handled; this pain lasts as long as several hours. This capacity, perhaps coupled with its reddish-brown colour, has given it the common name fire urchin; other commonly used names are Pacific fire urchin, elusive sea urchin, variable fire urchin, and electric sea urchin.

It plays host to the commensal shrimps Periclimenes colemani and Allopontonia brockii, and the zebra crab, Zebrida adamsii.

== Description ==
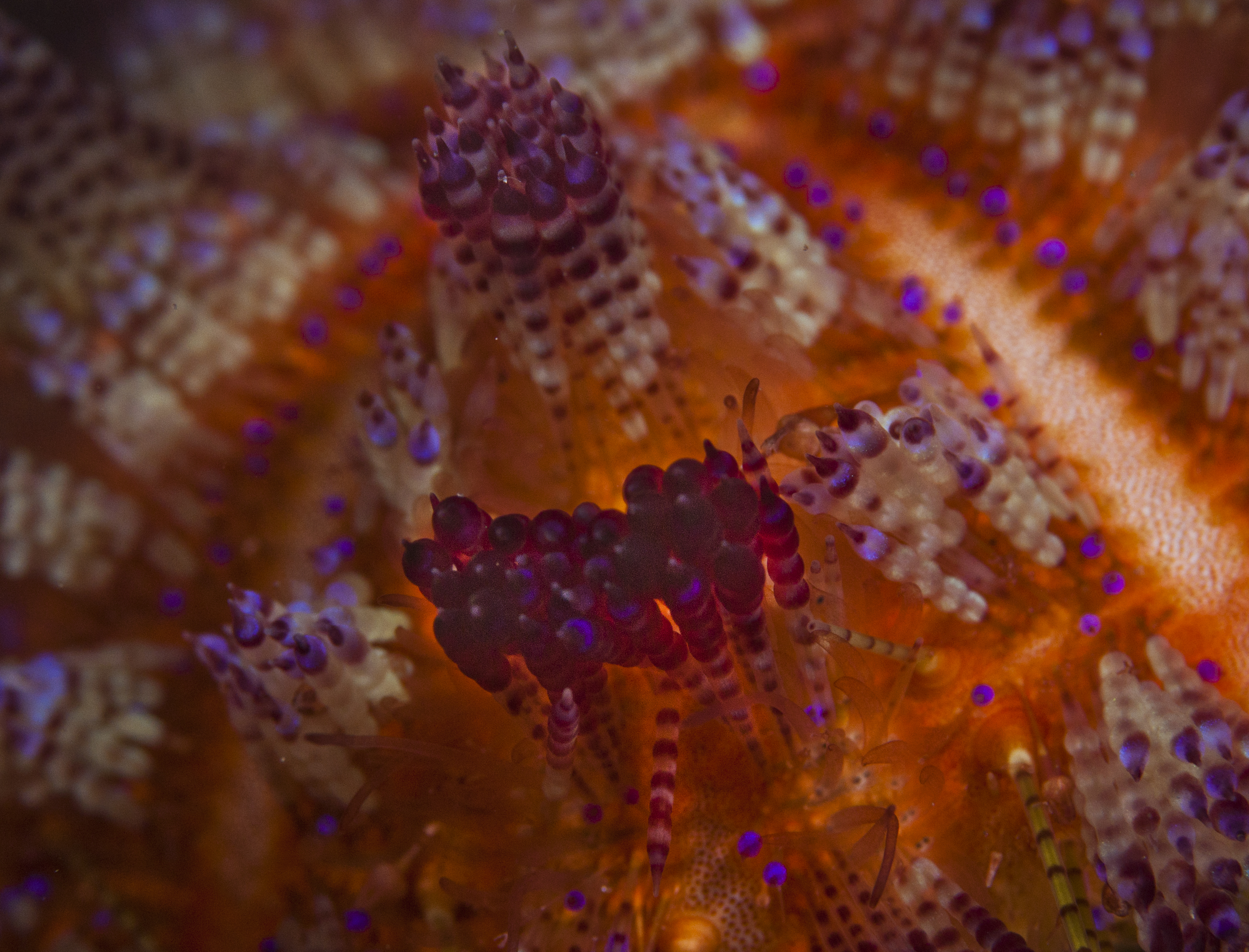
Close-up of Asthenosoma varium, showing distinctive spines

Asthenosoma varium is a large sea urchin, hemispherical in shape, and growing to a diameter of 25 cm (10 in). The plates from which the test is formed are not joined rigidly together, as is the case in most sea urchins. Instead, the plates are fused in groups of three, each group consisting of a central primary plate with a half-size plate on each side. The edge of each group of plates overlaps the next group in the same manner as tiles do on a roof, and this means the test is flexible. The test is divided into five interambulacral areas separated by five ambulacral grooves. There are two series of spines arranged in five radial bands, each spine articulating with the test in a ball-and-socket joint. The primary spines on the aboral (upper) surface are short, thick and sharply-pointed, grow in rectangular areas and are clumped together in dense bundles. Each spine has several hollow spherical capsules, separated by constrictions, which are filled with toxin; they function like hypodermic syringes. On the oral (under) surface, the primary spines have a different structure and are trumpet-shaped, the shaft being divided into four zones with different microstructure, in a similar way to the spines of some Diadematidae (especially Echinothrix) and Toxopneustidae. The secondary spines are long, flexible, slender and blunt, and mostly found near the base of the test; they are used in locomotion and righting, and have sensory cells at their tip. The general colour of this sea urchin is orangish, red, brown or purple, or occasionally beige or some shade of green. The primary spines are banded, usually with paler bases and darker tips, and the secondary spines are yellowish.

== Distribution and habitat ==
Asthenosoma varium is native to the Indo-Pacific region where its range extends from the eastern Indian Ocean to Japan, The Philippines, and New Caledonia. Records of its presence in the Red Sea are likely to be from the closely related species, Asthenosoma marisrubri. It inhabits coral environments at depths down to about 167 m (550 ft).

== Ecology ==
Several different organisms live in association with the Pacific fire urchin; these include the commensal shrimps Periclimenes colemani and Allopontonia brockii, and the parasitic snail Leutzenia asthenosomae, as well as the zebra crab, Zebrida adamsii. Siphamia tubifer is one of several small fish that make use of the protection provided by the urchin's toxic spines, as do certain cephalopods.

Asthenosoma varium is omnivorous, feeding on the algal film that covers the substrate, as well as on encrusting invertebrates such as sponges and tunicates, and also organic detritus. The sexes are separate in this species. The gametes are released into the water, where fertilisation takes place. The larvae are planktonic and drift for several months before settling on the seabed, undergoing metamorphosis and becoming juvenile sea urchins.

The spines of this sea urchin are venomous, and its bright colouration warns other organisms of this fact. Divers should be wary and avoid handling the urchins.
