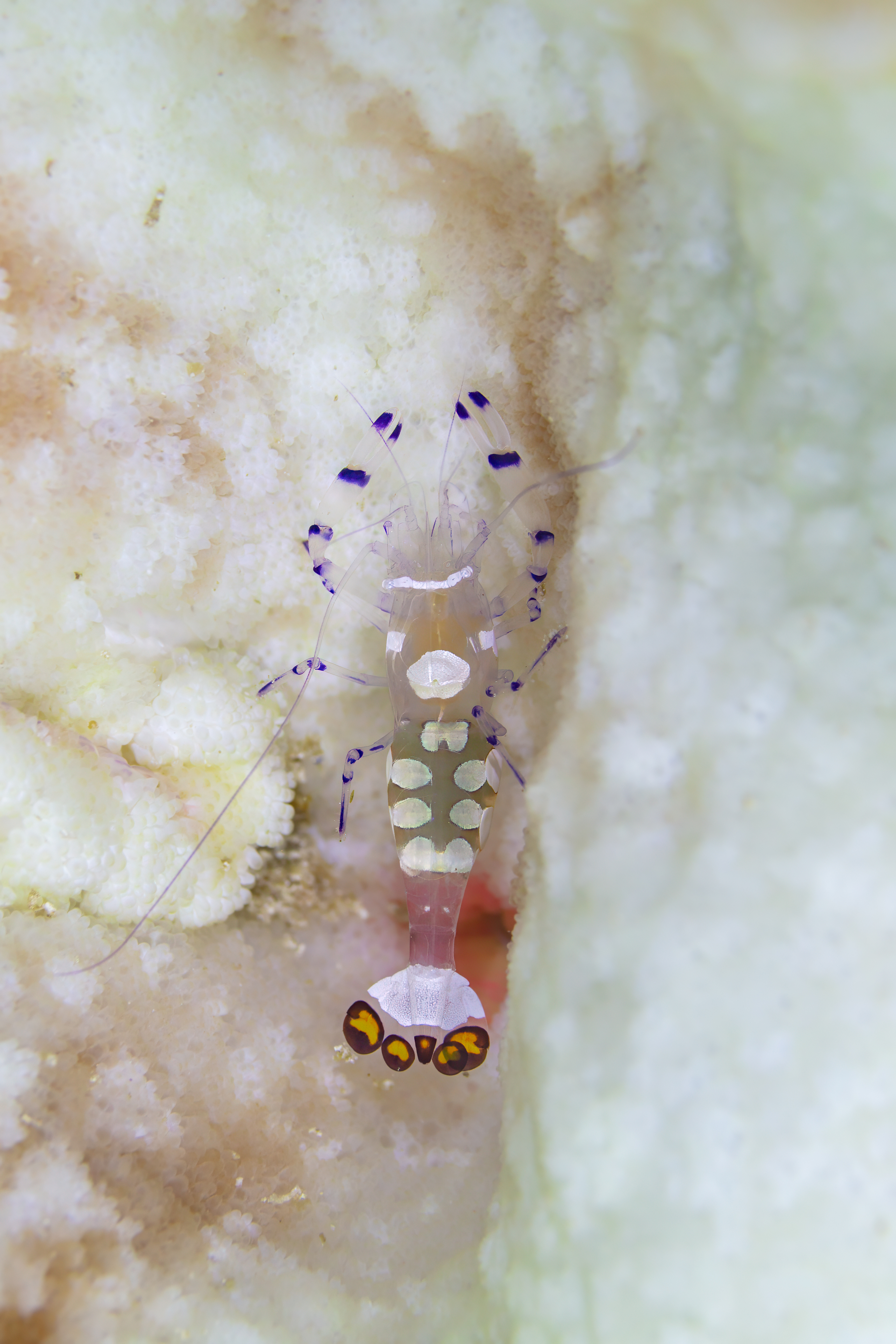
- Periclimenes brevicarpalis in Zanzibar, Tanzania

Scientific classification
- Kingdom: Animalia
- Phylum: Arthropoda
- Class: Malacostraca
- Order: Decapoda
- Suborder: Pleocyemata
- Infraorder: Caridea
- Family: Palaemonidae
- Genus: Periclimenes
- Species: P. brevicarpalis

Binomial name
- Periclimenes brevicarpalis (Schenkel, 1902)

Synonyms
- Ancylocaris brevicarpalis Schenkel, 1902; Ancylocaris hermitensis (Rathbun); Harpilius latirostris Lenz, 1905; Palaemonella aberrans Nobili, 1904; Palaemonella amboinensis Zehntner, 1894; Periclimenes hermitensis Rathbun, 1914; Periclimenes potina Nobili, 1905a

= Periclimenes brevicarpalis =

Species of crustacean

Periclimenes brevicarpalis, the glass anemone shrimp or peacock-tail anemone shrimp, is a species of shrimp belonging to the family Palaemonidae.

== Description ==
Periclimenes brevicarpalis can reach a length of 0.5 to 1.0 inch. The body is almost transparent, with some white spots over carapace and tail and orange spots outlined in black over the caudal fin. Females are larger than males and have more white spots. This species lives symbiotically with sea anemones, corals and jellyfish. Males attain similar average body sizes than females suggesting that the species is gonochoric and monogamous due to the fact that pairs of shrimp inhabit the same host individual in the field.

== Distribution ==
This species can be found in the tropical Pacific and Indian Oceans, including Australia.
