= Periclimenes mahei =

Scientific classification
- Domain: Eukaryota
- Kingdom: Animalia
- Phylum: Arthropoda
- Class: Malacostraca
- Order: Decapoda
- Suborder: Pleocyemata
- Infraorder: Caridea
- Family: Palaemonidae
- Genus: Periclimenes
- Species: P. mahei

Binomial name
- Periclimenes mahei Bruce, 1969

Species of crustacean

Holotype site: North West Bay, Mahé'"`UNIQ--ref-00000006-QINU`"'

Periclimenes mahei is a species of saltwater shrimp in the family, Palaemonidae, and was first described in 1969 by Alexander James Bruce.

The egg-bearing holotype was collected at depth of 1-2 fathoms in North West Bay, Mahé, in the Seychelles.

It is found in shallow subtidal waters on Acropora and madrepore corals. In Australia it is found in the Northern Territory, Western Australia and Queensland. It is also found in waters off Zanzibar, the Seychelles, the Comoro Islands, Tuomoto, and Amirante Islands.
