= Asthenosoma periculosum =

Scientific classification
- Domain: Eukaryota
- Kingdom: Animalia
- Phylum: Echinodermata
- Class: Echinoidea
- Order: Echinothurioida
- Family: Echinothuriidae
- Genus: Asthenosoma
- Species: A. periculosum

Binomial name
- Asthenosoma periculosum (Endean, 1964)

Species of sea urchin

Asthenosoma periculosum is a species of sea urchin of the family Echinothuriidae. Their armour is covered with spines. It is placed in the genus Asthenosoma and lives in the sea. Asthenosoma periculosum was first scientifically described in 1964 by Endean.
