= Periclimenes pholeter =

Scientific classification
- Domain: Eukaryota
- Kingdom: Animalia
- Phylum: Arthropoda
- Class: Malacostraca
- Order: Decapoda
- Suborder: Pleocyemata
- Infraorder: Caridea
- Family: Palaemonidae
- Genus: Periclimenes
- Species: P. pholeter

Binomial name
- Periclimenes pholeter Holthuis, 1973

Species of crustacean

Periclimenes pholeter, is a species of shrimp belonging to the family Palaemonidae. The species is closest to Periclimenes indicus, P. obscurus and P. toloensis, resembling these species in the presence of an epigastric tooth on the carapace, the shape of the abdomen, the spinulation of the carapace, and the unarmed fingers of the first chelipeds. P. pholeter most resembles P. indicus by the elongatecarpus and long fingers of the second pereiopods, differing in these features from P. toloensis, which has the fingers slightly less than half as long as the palm. In P. obscurus the fingers are shorter than the palm, but the carpus is about as long as the palm. From P. indicus, this species differs: by the greater size; by the much higher rostrum and the greater number of ventral rostral teeth; by the shorter eye; by the less slender antennular peduncle; by the more deeply cleft upper antennular flagellum; by the more robust scaphocerite; by the fingers of the first pereiopods (much longer than the palm); by the more slender pereiopods, especially the fifth, which is much longer than the ischium.

== Description ==
The rostrum reaches to or slightly beyond the end of the antennular peduncle, failing to reach the tip of the scaphocerite. It is straight, with the tip directed slightly upward. The upper margin bears nine or ten teeth, four of which are placed behind the orbit, the others are concentrated in the basal two-thirds of the rostrum. A small epigastric tooth is present on the dorsal margin of the carapace. In its proximal half the rostrum is of almost uniform height, in the distal half it narrows to the acute tip. A slightly larger immovable hepatic spine is placed below and a considerable distance behind the antennal. No other spines are present on the carapace. The pterygostomian angle is bluntly rounded.

The abdominal somites are smooth and their pleura are rounded. The sixth somite is about twice as long as the fifth, its pleura are triangular and bluntly pointed. The telson is 1.5 times as long as the sixth somite. The dorsal surface of the telson carries two pairs of spinules.

The eyes are well developed, but relatively small; they reach only slightly beyond the middle of the basal segment of the antennular peduncle. The cornea is rounded, it is about as long as and slightly wider than the stalk; it is well pigmented.

The scaphocerite reaches distinctly beyond the antennular peduncle, it is a little more than twice as long as wide. The antennal peduncle reaches about to the middle of the scaphocerite. A sharp spine is placed on the outer margin of the antennal peduncle near the base of the scaphocerite.

The mandible bears no palp; the incisor process ends in three or four teeth, the outer of which are the larger; the molarprocess bears some rounded teeth distally. The maxillula has the two laciniae reasonably slender, the palp is deeply bilobed. The maxilla bears a single endite which is cleft. The maxillipeds all have well-developed exopods with a multi-articulated flagellum. The fingers are long and slender, being about twice as long as the palm, their cutting edges being unarmed. The carpus is practically twice as long as the chela and slightly longer than the merus. The second legs are equal, they reach with the carpus beyond the antennular peduncle.

The dactylus is slender and bifid, having less than 1/5 of the length of the propodus. The propodus bears about seven spinules on the posterior margin.

The endopod of the fifth pleopod of the male is widened distally and has an irregularly rounded outline. The second male pleopod has the appendix masculina about as slender, but slightly longer than the appendix interna; it ends in a number of strong setae. The exopod of the uropod has the outer margin straight and ending in a tooth, which at its inner side bears a movable spine. The endopod is oval.

The total length of the males is 28 millimetres (1.1 in) to 33 millimetres (1.3 in); of the females 35 and 36 millimetres (1.4 and 1.4 in). The males have a carapace length of 13 millimetres (0.51 in) to 14 millimetres (0.55 in); the females of 14 and 15 millimetres (0.55 and 0.59 in) (with rostrum).

Their colour is less intensely red (pink even) than that of Calliasmata collected under the same circumstances. The colour of the body is pale yellowish green with many red chromatophores. These chromatophores form red bands along the anterior margin of the first and the posterior margins of all somites. The bands are darkest near the margins. The tail fan is of a light colour. The shrimp's appendages of the body are a pale pink.

== Distribution ==
The species is only known from Ras Muhammad Crack.
