= Periclimenes batei =

Scientific classification
- Kingdom: Animalia
- Phylum: Arthropoda
- Class: Malacostraca
- Order: Decapoda
- Suborder: Pleocyemata
- Infraorder: Caridea
- Family: Palaemonidae
- Genus: Periclimenes
- Species: P. batei

Binomial name
- Periclimenes batei Borradaile, 1888

Species of crustacean

Periclimenes batei is a species of shrimp found in the Pacific and Indian Oceans. It was first named by L. A. Borradaile in 1888, in commemoration of Charles Spence Bate who wrote the section on shrimp in the reports of the Challenger expedition.
