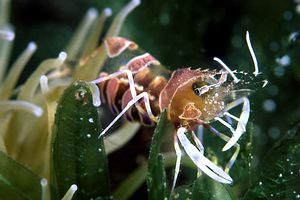

Scientific classification
- Domain: Eukaryota
- Kingdom: Animalia
- Phylum: Arthropoda
- Class: Malacostraca
- Order: Decapoda
- Suborder: Pleocyemata
- Infraorder: Caridea
- Family: Palaemonidae
- Genus: Periclimenes
- Species: P. amethysteus

Binomial name
- Periclimenes amethysteus (Risso, 1827)

= Periclimenes amethysteus =

Species of crustacean

Periclimenes amethysteus is a species of shrimp found in the Adriatic and Aegean Sea, and the western Mediterranean Sea. It was first named by Antoine Risso in 1827.
