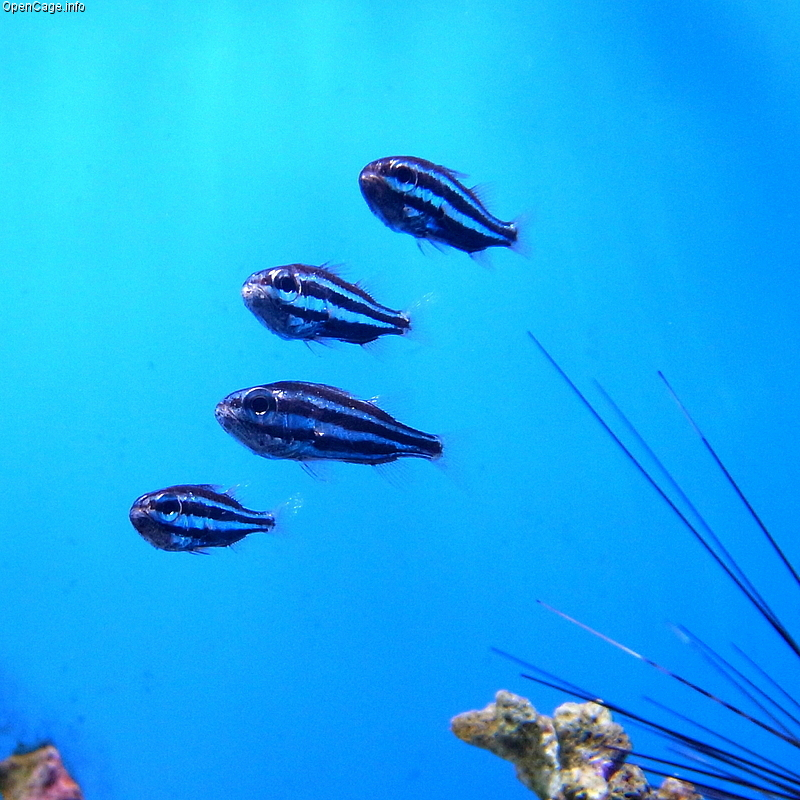
- Siphamia tubifer

Scientific classification
- Kingdom: Animalia
- Phylum: Chordata
- Class: Actinopterygii
- Order: Gobiiformes
- Family: Apogonidae
- Subfamily: Apogoninae
- Genus: Siphamia; M. C. W. Weber, 1909

Type species
- Siphamia tubifer M.C.W. Weber, 1909

= Siphamia =

Siphamia Temporal range: Burdigalian–Holocene

Genus of fishes

Siphamia is a genus of cardinalfishes native to the Indian and Pacific Ocean. Several of these species are commensal with various species of sea urchins.

Siphamia minor, a dwarf otolith-based species from the Burdigalian (Miocene) of southwestern India is the only fossil record for this genus.

== Species ==
The recognized species in this genus are:

- Siphamia arabica Gon & G. R. Allen, 2012
- Siphamia argentea Lachner, 1953 (silver siphonfish)
- Siphamia arnazae Gerald R. Allen & Mark V. Erdmann, 2019
- Siphamia brevilux Gon & G. R. Allen, 2012 (shortlight siphonfish)
- Siphamia cephalotes (Castelnau, 1875) (Wood's siphonfish)
- Siphamia corallicola G. R. Allen, 1993 (coral siphonfish)
- Siphamia cuneiceps Whitley, 1941 (wedgehead siphonfish)
- Siphamia cyanophthalma Gon & G. R. Allen, 2012 (blue-eye siphonfish)
- Siphamia elongata Lachner, 1953 (elongated siphonfish)
- Siphamia fistulosa (M. C. W. Weber, 1909) (Fistulose cardinalfish)
- Siphamia fraseri Gon & G. R. Allen, 2012
- Siphamia fuscolineata Lachner, 1953 (crown-of-thorns cardinalfish)
- Siphamia goreni Gon & G. R. Allen, 2012
- Siphamia guttulatus (Alleyne & W. J. Macleay, 1877) (speckled siphonfish)
- Siphamia jebbi G. R. Allen, 1993 (Jebb's siphonfish)
- Siphamia majimai Matsubara & Iwai, 1958 (striped siphonfish)
- Siphamia mossambica J. L. B. Smith, 1955 (sea urchin cardinal)
- Siphamia papuensis Gon, G. R. Allen, Erdmann & Gouws, 2014 (Papuan siphonfish)
- Siphamia randalli Gon & G. R. Allen, 2012
- Siphamia roseigaster (E. P. Ramsay & J. D. Ogilby, 1887) (pink-breasted siphonfish)
- Siphamia senoui Gon & G. R. Allen, 2012
- Siphamia spinicola Gon & G. R. Allen, 2012 (reef siphonfish)
- Siphamia stenotes Gon & G. R. Allen, 2012 (narrow-lined siphonfish)
- Siphamia tubifer M. C. W. Weber, 1909 (tubifer cardinalfish)
- Siphamia tubulata (M. C. W. Weber, 1909) (siphonfish)
- Siphamia minor Carolin, Bajpai, Maurya & Schwarzhans, 2022 (otolith-based fossil species)
