= Allopontonia =

Scientific classification
- Kingdom: Animalia
- Phylum: Arthropoda
- Clade: Pancrustacea
- Class: Malacostraca
- Order: Decapoda
- Suborder: Pleocyemata
- Infraorder: Caridea
- Family: Palaemonidae
- Genus: Allopontonia; Bruce, 1972

Genus of crustaceans

Allopontonia is a genus of shrimp in the family Palaemonidae, containing two species:

- Allopontonia alastairi Bruce, 2010
- Allopontonia brockii (de Man, 1888)
