= Asthenosoma dilatatum =

Scientific classification
- Domain: Eukaryota
- Kingdom: Animalia
- Phylum: Echinodermata
- Class: Echinoidea
- Order: Echinothurioida
- Family: Echinothuriidae
- Genus: Asthenosoma
- Species: A. dilatatum

Binomial name
- Asthenosoma dilatatum (Mortensen, 1934)

Species of sea urchin

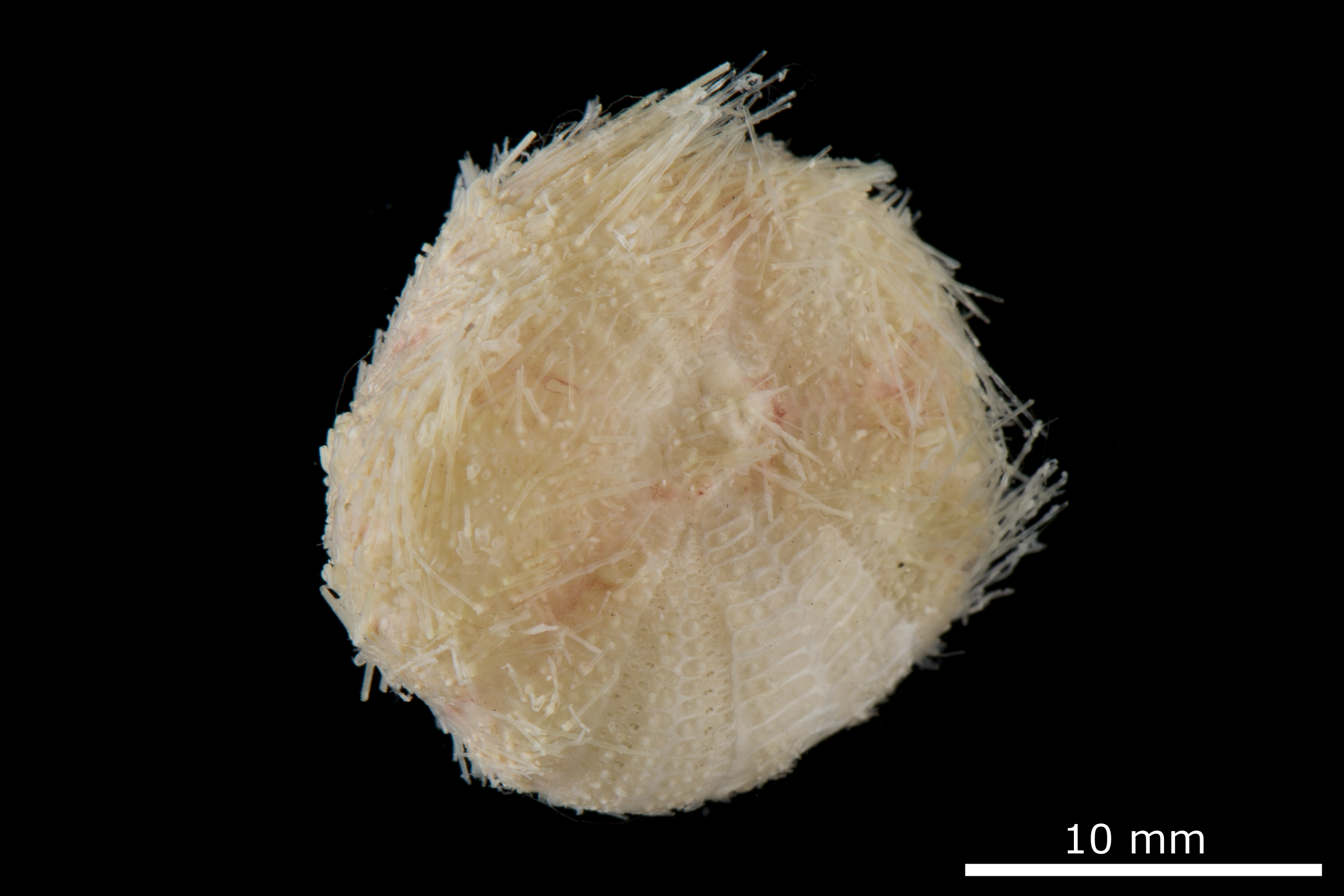

Asthenosoma dilatatum is a species of sea urchin of the family Echinothuriidae. Their armour is covered with spines. It is placed in the genus Asthenosoma and lives in the sea. Asthenosoma dilatatum was first scientifically described in 1934 by Ole Theodor Jensen Mortensen.
