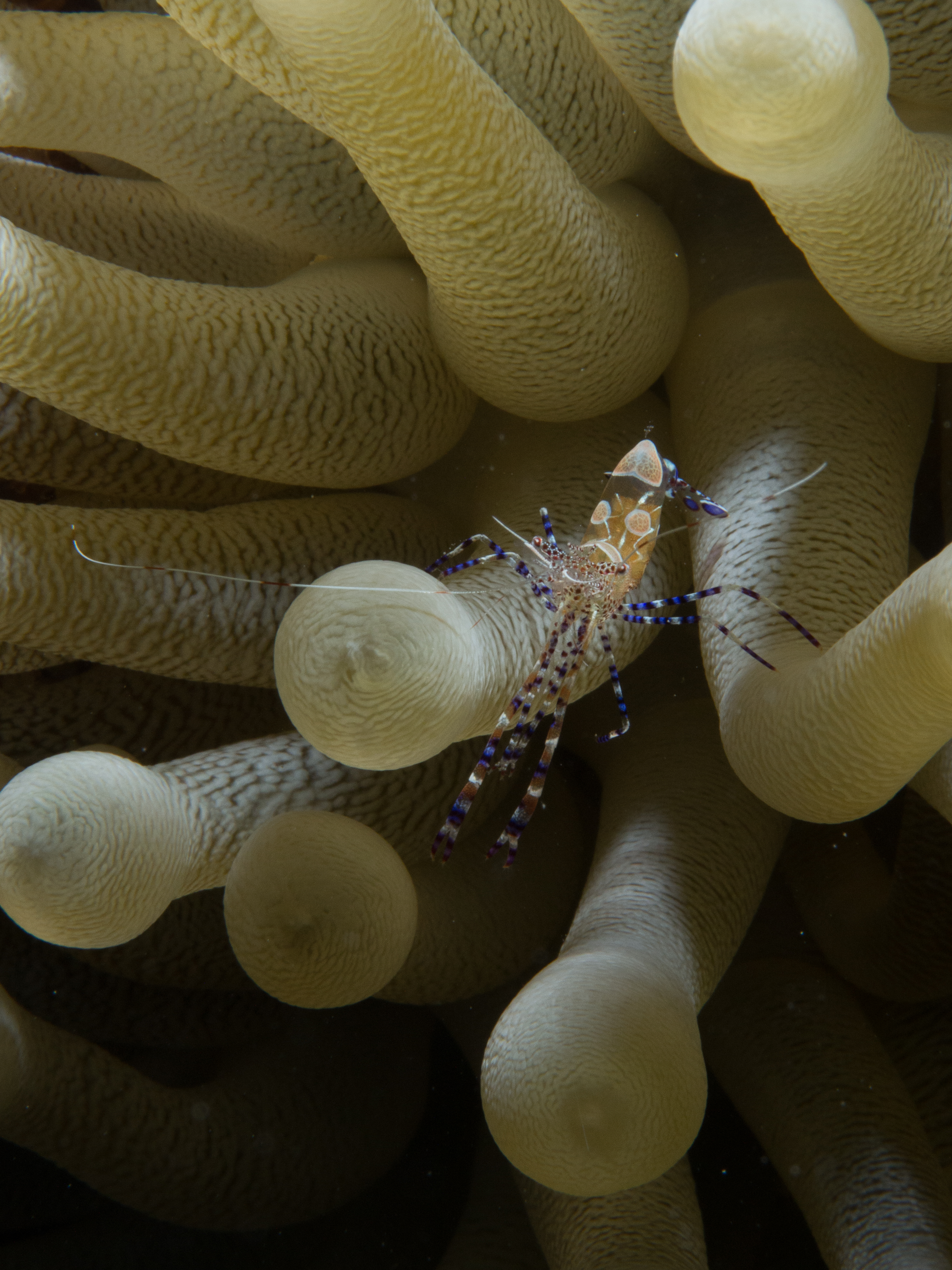

Scientific classification
- Domain: Eukaryota
- Kingdom: Animalia
- Phylum: Arthropoda
- Class: Malacostraca
- Order: Decapoda
- Suborder: Pleocyemata
- Infraorder: Caridea
- Family: Palaemonidae
- Genus: Periclimenes
- Species: P. yucatanicus

Binomial name
- Periclimenes yucatanicus (Ives, 1891)

= Spotted cleaner shrimp =

Species of crustacean

The spotted cleaner shrimp (Periclimenes yucatanicus), is a species of cleaner shrimp common to the Caribbean Sea. These shrimp live among the tentacles of several species of sea anemones. They sway their body and wave their antennae in order to attract fish from which they eat dead tissue, algae and parasites.

== Description ==
The spotted cleaner shrimp grows to a length of about 2.5 cm (1 in). It has a transparent body patterned with brown and white saddle shaped markings. The chelae and legs are boldly striped in red, purple and white. There are two pairs of long white antennae banded in black.

== Distribution ==
The spotted cleaner shrimp is found at depths down to about 24 metres (79 ft) in the Caribbean Sea, southern Florida, the Bahamas and as far south as Colombia.

== Life cycle ==
Breeding takes place in the summer and females have been seen brooding eggs under their abdomens in the months of July and August. After hatching, the larvae pass through several planktonic larval stages before settling on the seabed and undergoing metamorphosis into the adult form.

== Ecology ==
The spotted cleaner shrimp lives in close association with a sea anemone, either Condylactis gigantea, Lebrunia danae, Bartholomea lucida or Bartholomea annulata. It lives among the tentacles and up to six individual shrimps have been seen on one sea anemone. It swishes its antennae around in the water to attract the attention of passing reef fish. When they pose motionless beside the anemone, it emerges from the tentacles and removes and feeds on external parasites and flakes of loose skin from the fish. It even enters the mouths of fishes and cleans behind their gill covers apparently with no likelihood that it will get eaten. It has also been found associated with the sea anemone Rhodactis sanctithomae in the US Virgin Islands, a species of anemone not previously recognised as a symbiont species. Also in the Virgin Islands, it has been seen on the tentacles of the jellyfish Cassiopea.
