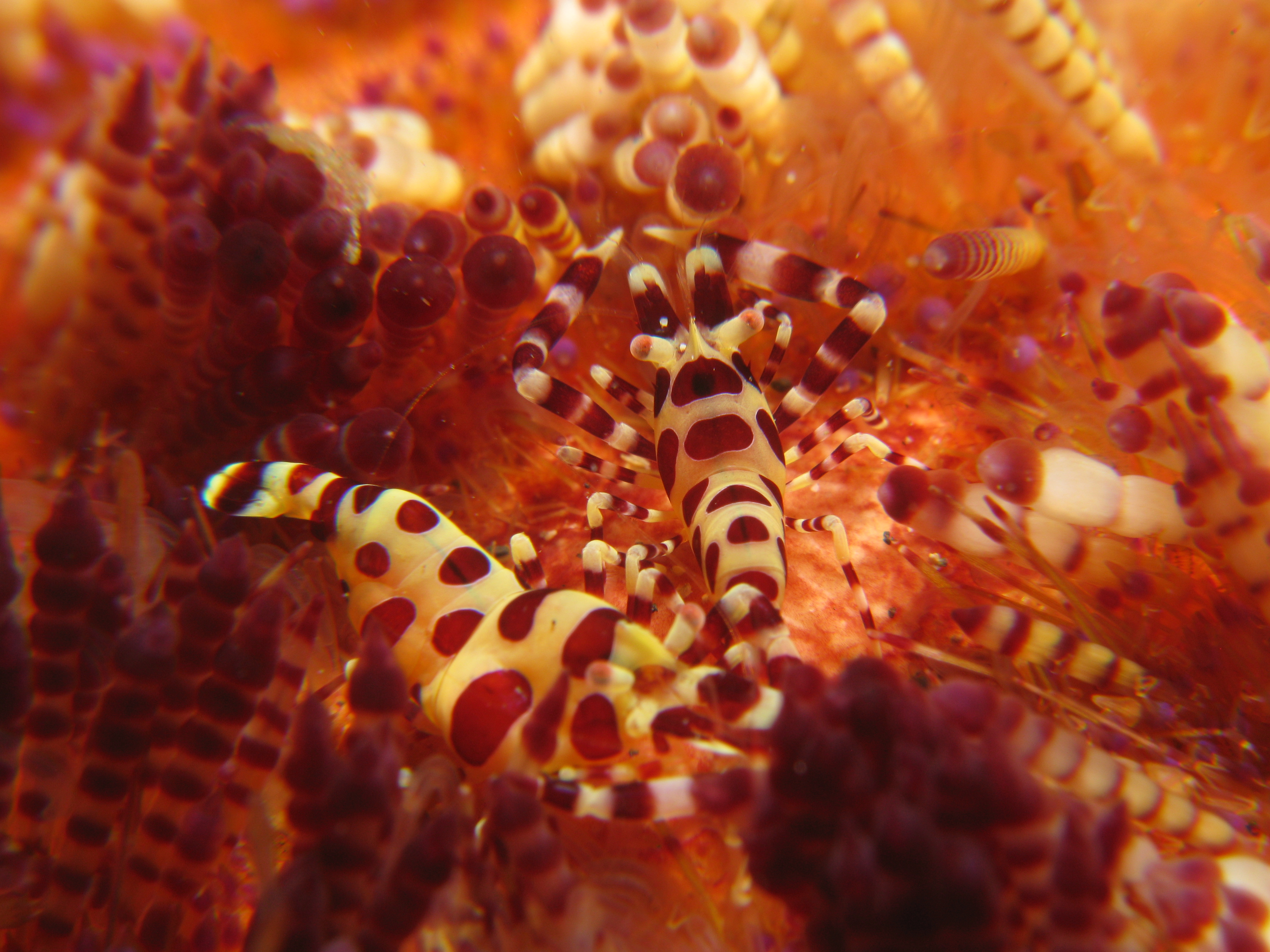

Scientific classification
- Domain: Eukaryota
- Kingdom: Animalia
- Phylum: Arthropoda
- Class: Malacostraca
- Order: Decapoda
- Suborder: Pleocyemata
- Infraorder: Caridea
- Family: Palaemonidae
- Genus: Periclimenes
- Species: P. colemani

Binomial name
- Periclimenes colemani Bruce, 1975

= Periclimenes colemani =

Species of crustacean

Periclimenes colemani is a species of saltwater shrimp found in the Indo-Pacific Ocean that was first described in 1975 by Alexander James Bruce.

It is found in association with the sea urchin Asthenosoma intermedium at depths to 12 m on coral reefs in the littoral and sub-littoral zones.
