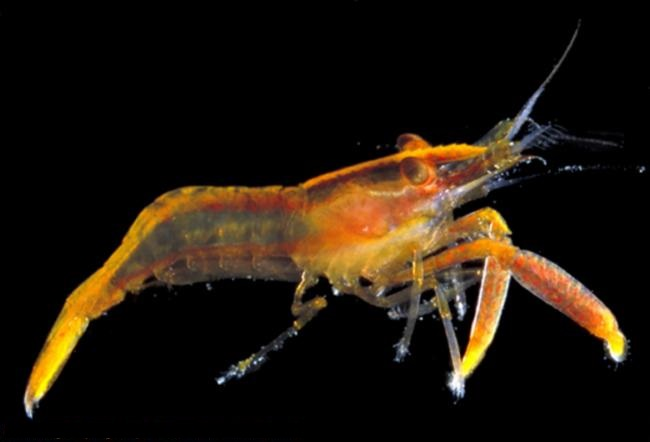

Scientific classification
- Domain: Eukaryota
- Kingdom: Animalia
- Phylum: Arthropoda
- Class: Malacostraca
- Order: Decapoda
- Suborder: Pleocyemata
- Infraorder: Caridea
- Family: Palaemonidae
- Genus: Periclimenes
- Species: P. carinidactylus

Binomial name
- Periclimenes carinidactylus Bruce, 1969

= Periclimenes carinidactylus =

Species of crustacean

Periclimenes carinidactylus is a species of saltwater shrimp found in Australian coastal waters and was first described in 1969 by Alexander James Bruce.
