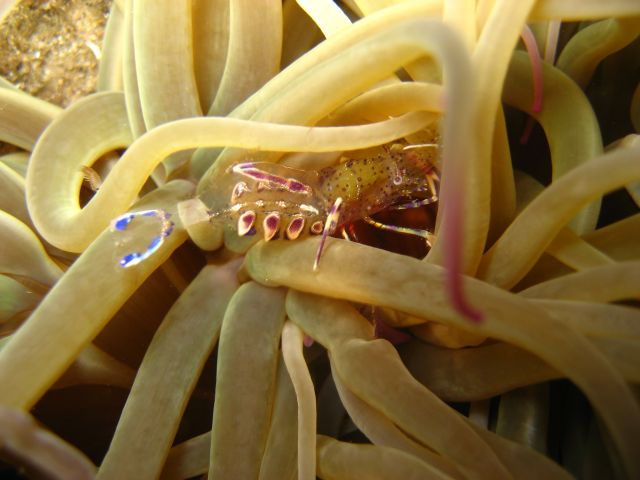

Scientific classification
- Kingdom: Animalia
- Phylum: Arthropoda
- Clade: Pancrustacea
- Class: Malacostraca
- Order: Decapoda
- Suborder: Pleocyemata
- Infraorder: Caridea
- Family: Palaemonidae
- Genus: Periclimenes
- Species: P. sagittifer

Binomial name
- Periclimenes sagittifer (Norman, 1861)

= Periclimenes sagittifer =

Species of crustacean

Periclimenes sagittifer is a crustacean first described by Norman in 1861. Periclimenes sagittifer is included in the family Palaemonidae. No subspecies listed in the Catalogue of Life.

== Description ==
A transparent body except for the typical violet arrow on the abdomen, the legs have coloring of yellow and blue alternately, and the tail is characterized by a blue arrow. Up to 25 mm. They live in symbiosis with sea anemones such Anemonia sulcata, Aiptasia mutabilis, Cribrinopsis crassa and Condylactis aurantiaca, feeding on the detritus.

== Distribution and habitat ==
Atlantic Ocean and the eastern Mediterranean Sea.
