= Charles Spence Bate =

British zoologist and dentist (1819–1889)

- Born: 16 March 1819; Truro, Cornwall, England, United Kingdom
- Died: 29 July 1889 (aged 70)
- Spouse: Emily Hele (m. 1847; died 1884)
- Scientific career
- Author abbrev. (botany): Bate

Charles Spence Bate, FRS, FLS (16 March 1819 – 29 July 1889) was a British zoologist and dentist.

== Life ==
Charles Spence Bate was born at Trenick House near Truro, the son of Charles Bate (1789–1872) and Harriet Spence (1788–1879). Charles adopted "Spence Bate" as his surname, perhaps to distinguish himself from his father, and used that name consistently in his publications; it was also used consistently by his contemporaries to refer to him.

He practiced dentistry first at Swansea, and then at Plymouth, taking over his father's practice. He was president of the Odontology Society.

He was an authority on the Crustacea, for which he was elected a fellow of the Royal Society in 1861, and a frequent correspondent of Charles Darwin, mostly concerning their shared interest in barnacles. Together with John Obadiah Westwood, he wrote "A history of the British sessile-eyed Crustacea" in 1868. He wrote reports on the crustaceans collected during the HMS Challenger expedition of 1872–1876.

He died on 29 July 1889, at The Rock, South Brent, Devon and was buried in Plymouth cemetery.

== Family ==
On 17 June 1847, at Littlehempston church, near Totnes, he married Emily Amelia, daughter of John Hele and sister of the Rev. Henry Hele, the rector; she died on 4 April 1884, leaving two sons and a daughter.

Bate married for a second time in October 1887.

== Legacy ==
A number of species are named in his honour:

- Pseudoparatanais batei (G. O. Sars, 1882)
- Amphilochus spencebatei (Stebbing, 1876)
- Scyllarus batei (Holthuis, 1946)
- Costa batei (Brady, 1866)
- Periclimenes batei (Holthuis, 1959)

== Bibliography ==
- Bate, C. Spence; Westwood, J.O. (1863–1868). A History of the British Sessile-eyed Crustacea. London: John van Voorst. (in 2 volumes)
