= Periclimenes exederens =

Scientific classification
- Domain: Eukaryota
- Kingdom: Animalia
- Phylum: Arthropoda
- Class: Malacostraca
- Order: Decapoda
- Suborder: Pleocyemata
- Infraorder: Caridea
- Family: Palaemonidae
- Genus: Periclimenes
- Species: P. exederens

Binomial name
- Periclimenes exederens Bruce, 1969

Species of crustacean

Periclimenes exederens is a species of saltwater shrimp in the family, Palaemonidae, and was first described in 1969 by Alexander James Bruce.

The holotype was collected in the South China Sea, at a depth of 47-48 fathoms on 21 February 1965.
