= Periclimenes affinis =

Scientific classification
- Domain: Eukaryota
- Kingdom: Animalia
- Phylum: Arthropoda
- Class: Malacostraca
- Order: Decapoda
- Suborder: Pleocyemata
- Infraorder: Caridea
- Family: Palaemonidae
- Genus: Periclimenes
- Species: P. affinis

Binomial name
- Periclimenes affinis (Zehntner, 1894)

Synonyms
- Periclimenes brocketti Borradaile, 1915

Species of crustacean

Periclimenes affinis is a species of shrimp found in the Pacific and Indian Oceans. It was first named by Leo Zehntner in 1894.
