= Periclimenes acanthimerus =

Scientific classification
- Domain: Eukaryota
- Kingdom: Animalia
- Phylum: Arthropoda
- Class: Malacostraca
- Order: Decapoda
- Suborder: Pleocyemata
- Infraorder: Caridea
- Family: Palaemonidae
- Genus: Periclimenes
- Species: P. acanthimerus

Binomial name
- Periclimenes acanthimerus Bruce, 2006

Species of crustacean

Periclimenes acanthimerus is a species of shrimp found in New Caledonia. It was first named by Alexander James Bruce in 2006.
