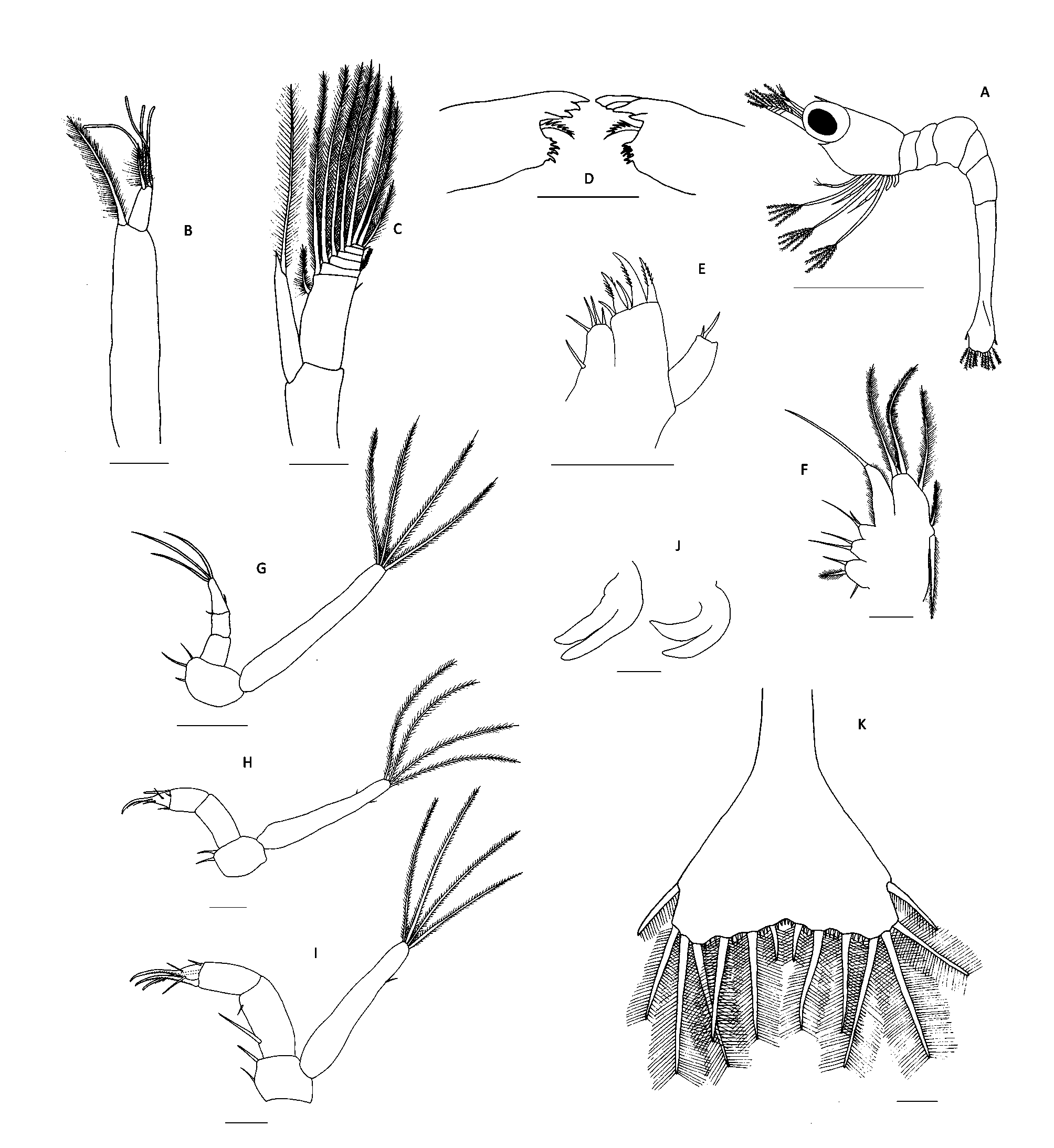
- Illustration of Periclimenes aegylios

Scientific classification
- Domain: Eukaryota
- Kingdom: Animalia
- Phylum: Arthropoda
- Class: Malacostraca
- Order: Decapoda
- Suborder: Pleocyemata
- Infraorder: Caridea
- Family: Palaemonidae
- Genus: Periclimenes
- Species: P. aegylios

Binomial name
- Periclimenes aegylios Grippa & d'Udekem d'Acoz, 1996

= Periclimenes aegylios =

Species of crustacean

Periclimenes aegylios is a species of shrimp found in the Adriatic Sea and the western Mediterranean Sea. It was first named by Grippa and d'Udekem d'Acoz in 1996.
