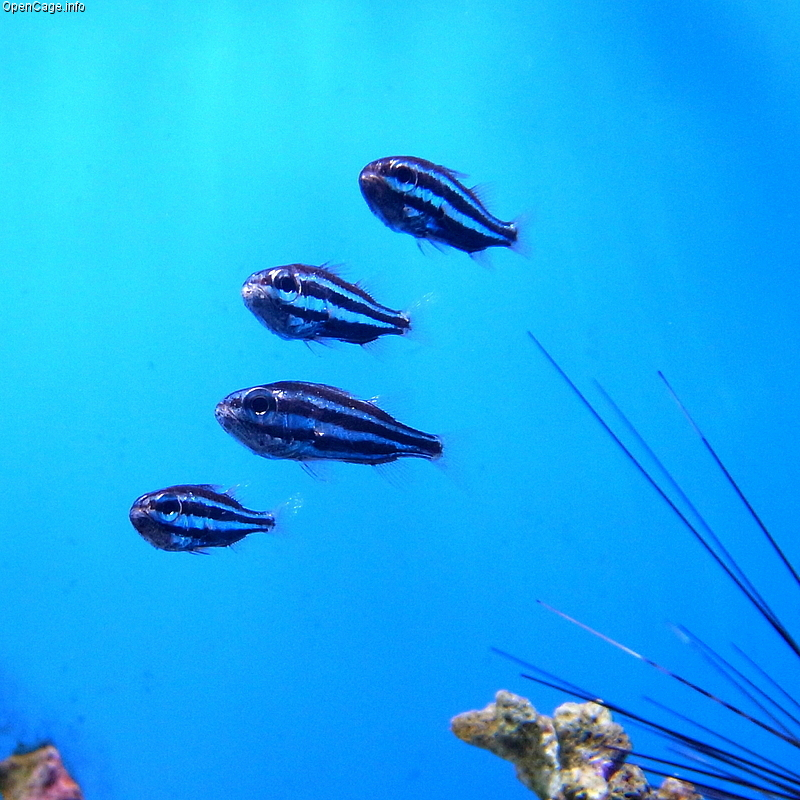

Conservation status
- Least Concern (IUCN 3.1)

Scientific classification
- Kingdom: Animalia
- Phylum: Chordata
- Class: Actinopterygii
- Division: Teleostei
- Order: Gobiiformes
- Family: Apogonidae
- Genus: Siphamia
- Species: S. tubifer

Binomial name
- Siphamia tubifer M. C. W. Weber, 1909

Synonyms
- Beanea trivittata Steindachner, 1902; Siphamia cuprea Lachner, 1953; Siphamia ovalis Lachner, 1953

= Siphamia tubifer =

Species of fish

Siphamia tubifer, the sea urchin cardinalfish, urchin cardinalfish or tubifer cardinalfish, is a species of marine ray-finned fish belonging to the family Apogonidae, the cardinalfishes. This cardinalfish is found in the Indian and western Pacific Oceans.

== Taxonomy ==
Siphamia tubifer was first formally described in 1902 by the German-Dutch zoologist and biogeographer Max Carl Wilhelm Weber with its type locality given as the northeastern point of Timor, Timor Island, southern Malay Archipelago, from depths between 27 and 55 m (89 and 180 ft). When Weber described S. tubifer he also described the new monotypic genus Siphamia with this species as its type species by monotypy. In 1902 Franz Steindachner had also described a new species, Beanea trivittata and genus Beanea, from the Gulf of Suez, a taxon which is considered to likely be a synonym of S. tubifer. This taxon has no type and the International Commission on Zoological Nomenclature has suppressed this name. The genus Siphamia is classified in the tribe Siphaminii, in the subfamily Apogoninae in the family Apogonidae in the suborder Apogonoidei in the order Gobiiformes.

== Etymology ==
Siphamia tubifer is the type species of the genus Siphimia, a name which prefixessiph- onto Amia, which is derived from siphon, meaning "tube" ot "pipe", this is an allusion to the silvery dusky tube-likeform gland of this species, running from beneath the tongue, along lower flanks, past the anus and almost reaching nearly as far as the base of the caudal fin, this was later found to be a bioluminescent organ. Amia, in this case, is a non binomial name originally coined by Laurens Theodorus Gronovius for the genus Apogon which is now used as a common suffix for genus names within the cardinalfish family. The specific name, tubifer, means "tube bearing", also a reference to the bioluminescent organ.

== Description ==
Siphamia tubifer has a short, deep body with a compressed cross section and it reaches a maximum total length of 7 cm (2.8 in). The first dorsal fin has 7 spines, the second dorsal fin has 1 spine and 9 or 10 soft rays while the anal fin has 2 spines and 8 soft rays. The overall colour is blackish, frequently showing apattern of alternating silvery-white and thinner blackish stripes.

== Distribution and habitat ==
Siphamia tubifer has an Indo-Pacific distribution. It is found along teh eastern African coast between the Gulf of Suez and Mozambique, the Comoro Islands, Madagascar, the Syechelles, the Maldives, southern India, Sri Lanka, theAndaman and Nicobar Islands, east through the Malay Archipelago into the Western Pacific. In the Pacific it occurs north to the Ryukyu Islands, south to northern Australia and east to Vanuatu. It is apparently absebt from the waters aroudn New Guinea. The sea urchin cardinalfish is found at depths between 1 and 100 m (3 ft 3 in and 328 ft 1 in) on sheltered reefs.

== Behaviour ==
Siphamia tubifer hides among the spines of sea urchins during the day, and it emerges to feed at night. Male S. tubifer are mouthbrooders, holding their fertilized clutches of eggs in their mouths and releasing the larvae when they are in the preflexion stage. This fish has a facultative symbiotic relationship with a bacterium, Photobacterium mandapamensis, which provides bioluminescence for the fish in a specialized light organ in its abdomen.

== Bioluminescence ==
S. tubifer is thought to acquire the bacteria through ingestion of seawater after its light organ has mostly developed. The luminescence system primarily consists of a ventral light organ that holds the bacteria and a shutter lens in the abdomen. The fish can open and close this shutter at will, controlling the light that it emits. One study showed that at twilight, S. tubifer left its urchin and luminesced to attract and feed on zooplankton near the ocean bottom. Once completely dark again, it stopped emitting light and returned.
