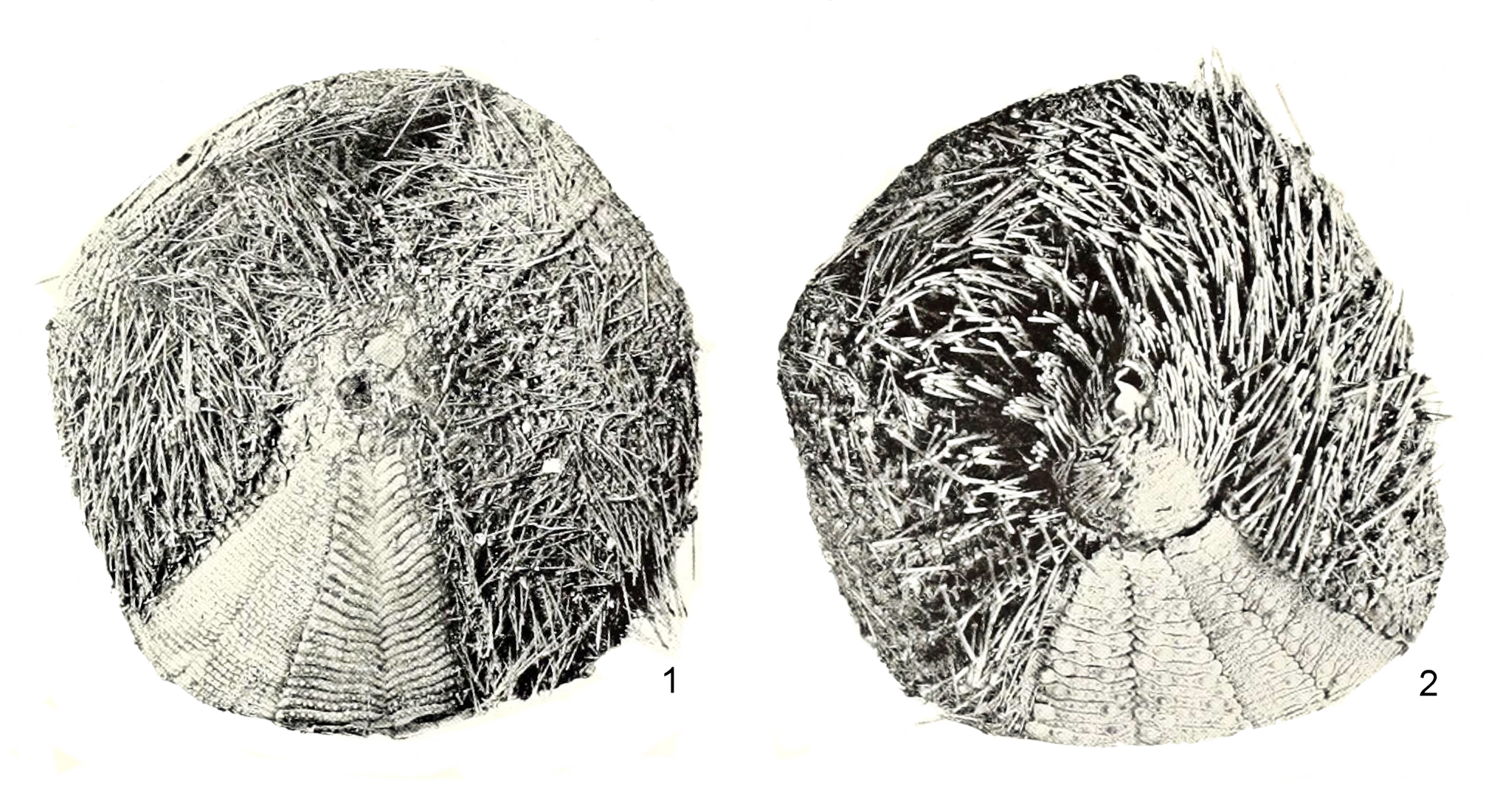

Scientific classification
- Kingdom: Animalia
- Phylum: Echinodermata
- Class: Echinoidea
- Order: Echinothurioida
- Family: Echinothuriidae
- Genus: Asthenosoma
- Species: A. intermedium

Binomial name
- Asthenosoma intermedium (Clark, 1938)

= Asthenosoma intermedium =

Species of sea urchin

Asthenosoma intermedium is a species of sea urchin of the family Echinothuriidae. Their armour is covered with spines. It is placed in the genus Asthenosoma and lives in the sea. Asthenosoma intermedium was first scientifically described in 1938 by Hubert Lyman Clark.
