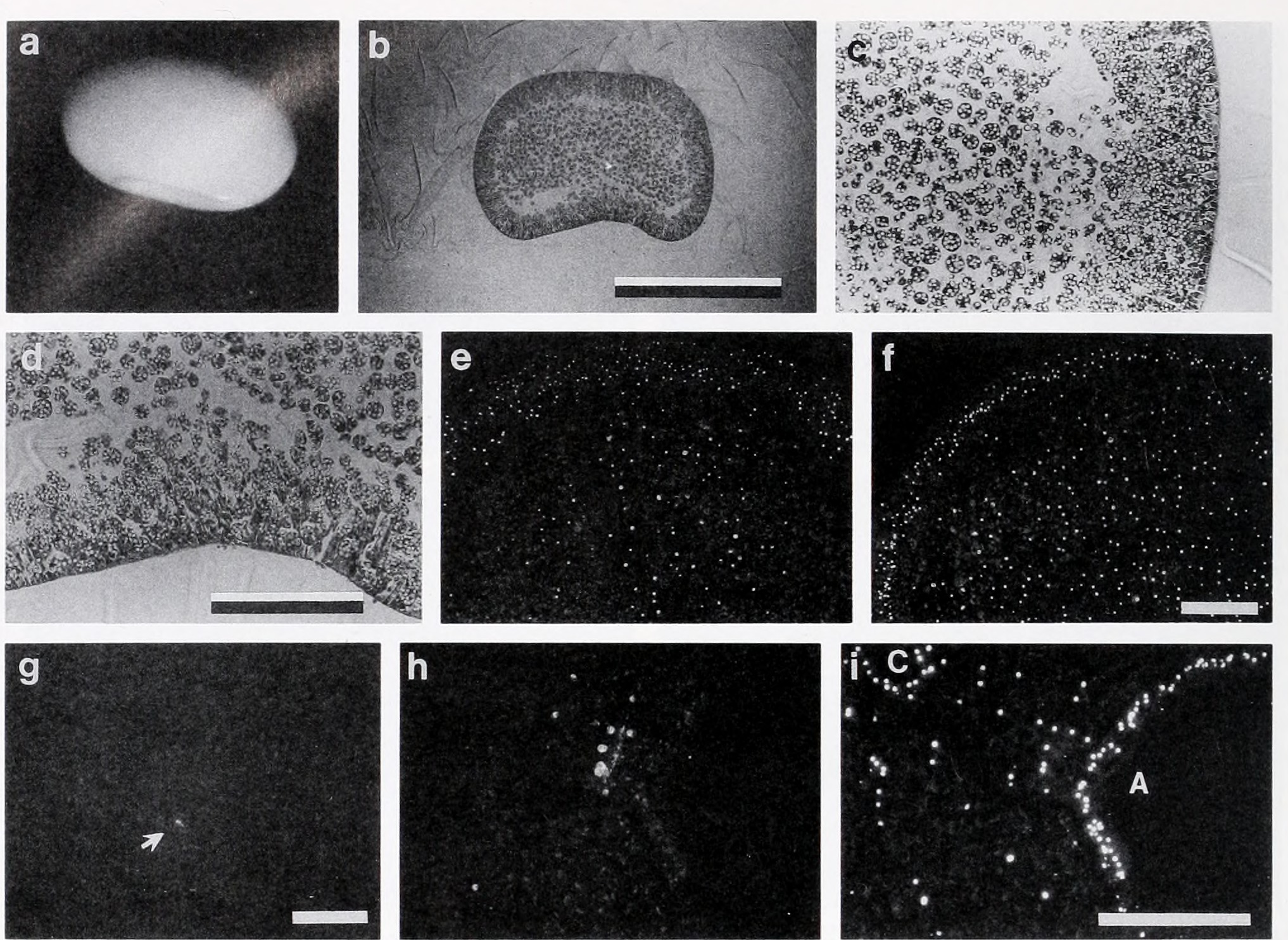
- Later embryonic stages of Asthenosoma ijiinai

Scientific classification
- Domain: Eukaryota
- Kingdom: Animalia
- Phylum: Echinodermata
- Class: Echinoidea
- Order: Echinothurioida
- Family: Echinothuriidae
- Genus: Asthenosoma
- Species: A. ijimai

Binomial name
- Asthenosoma ijimai (Yoshiwara, 1897)

= Asthenosoma ijimai =

Species of sea urchin

Asthenosoma ijimai is a species of sea urchin of the family Echinothuriidae. Their armour is covered with spines. It is placed in the genus Asthenosoma and lives in the sea. Asthenosoma ijimai was first scientifically described in 1897 by Yoshiwara.
