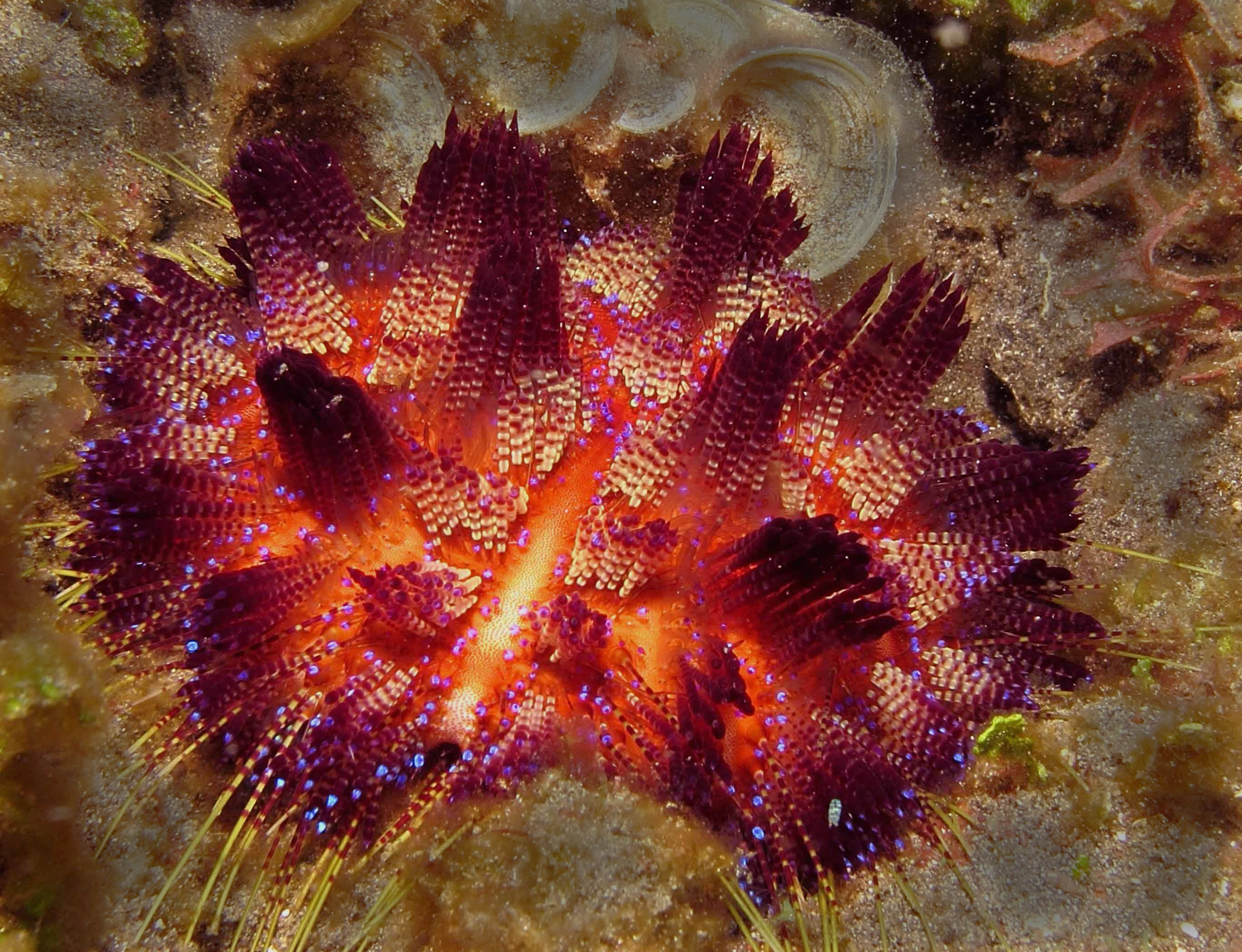
- Fire urchin (Asthenosoma varium)

Scientific classification
- Kingdom: Animalia
- Phylum: Echinodermata
- Class: Echinoidea
- Order: Echinothurioida
- Family: Echinothuriidae
- Subfamily: Echinothuriinae
- Genus: Asthenosoma (Grube, 1868)

Species
- See text

= Asthenosoma =

Asthenosoma Temporal range: Middle Jurassic–Recent

Genus of sea urchins

Asthenosoma is a genus of sea urchins in the family Echinothuriidae. Their spines are covered with harmful venom capsules.

== Taxonomy ==
The World Echinoidea Database recognises the following species:

- Asthenosoma dilatatum Mortensen, 1934
- Asthenosoma ijimai Yoshiwara, 1897
- Asthenosoma intermedium H.L. Clark, 1938
- Asthenosoma marisrubri Weinberg & de Ridder, 1998 – "Red sea fire urchin"
- Asthenosoma periculosum Endean, 1964
- Asthenosoma striatissimum Ravn, 1928 †
- Asthenosoma varium Grube, 1868 – "fire sea urchin".

"†" means an extinct taxon.

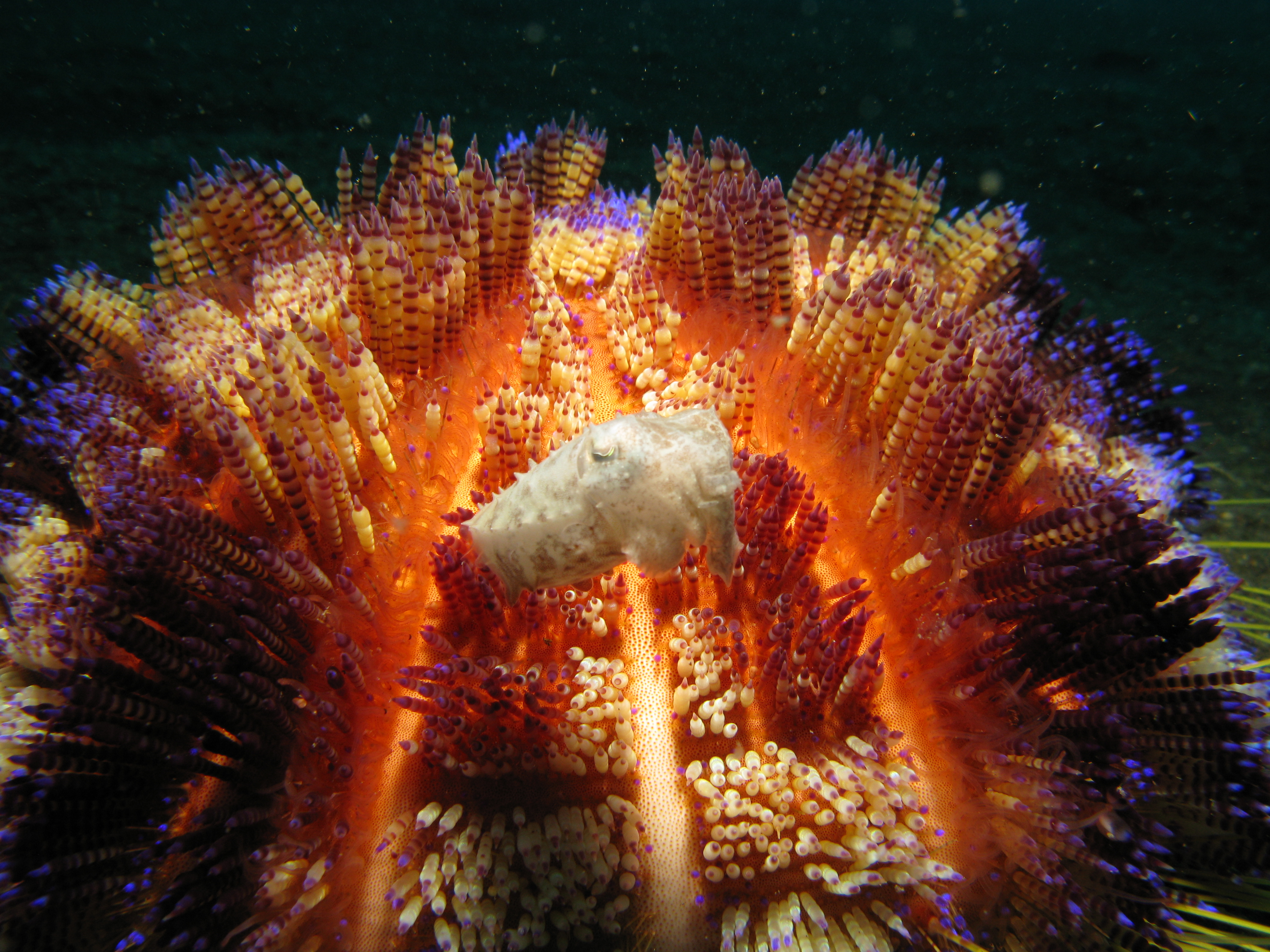
Asthenosoma varium

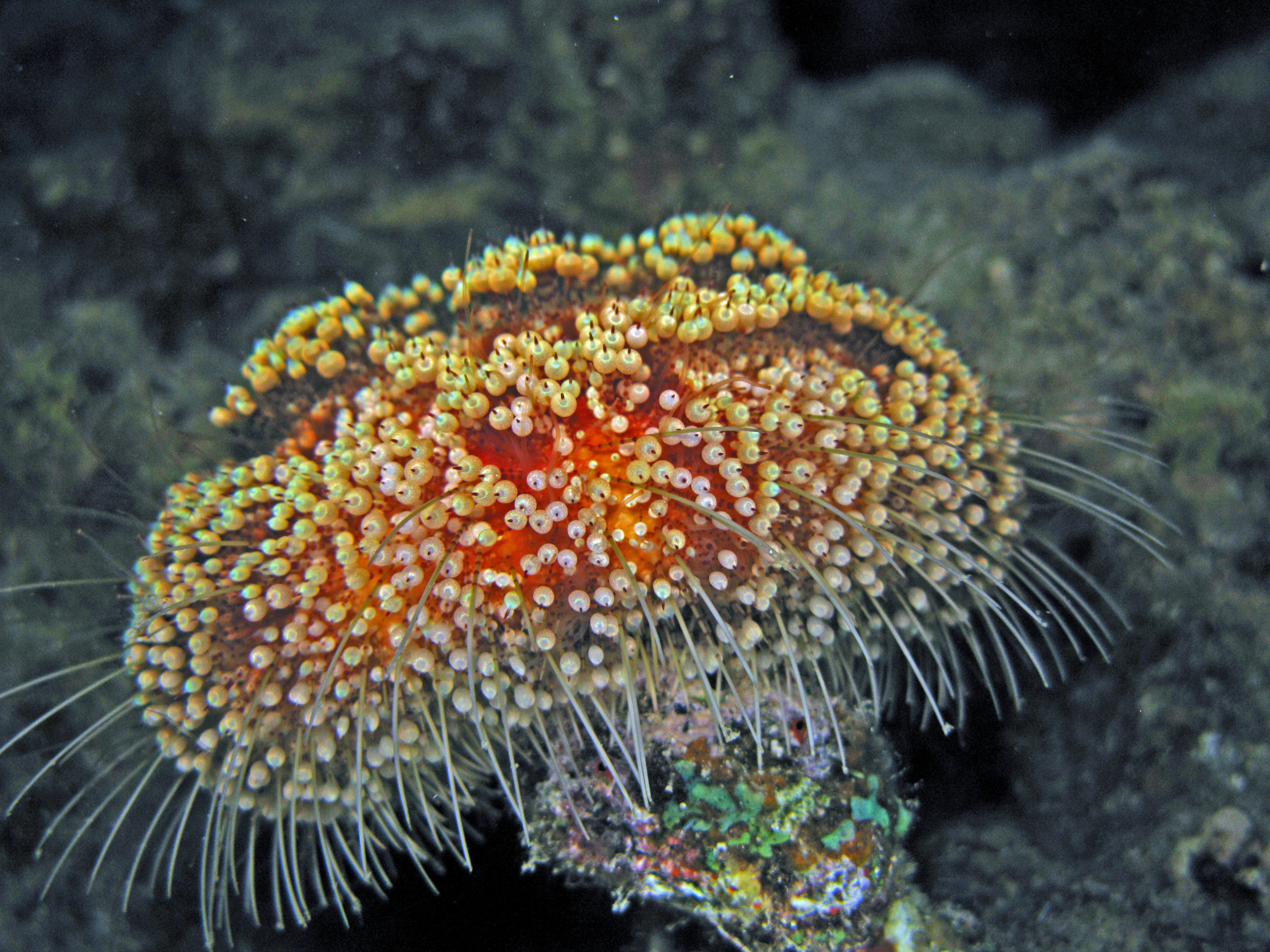
Asthenosoma marisrubri.
