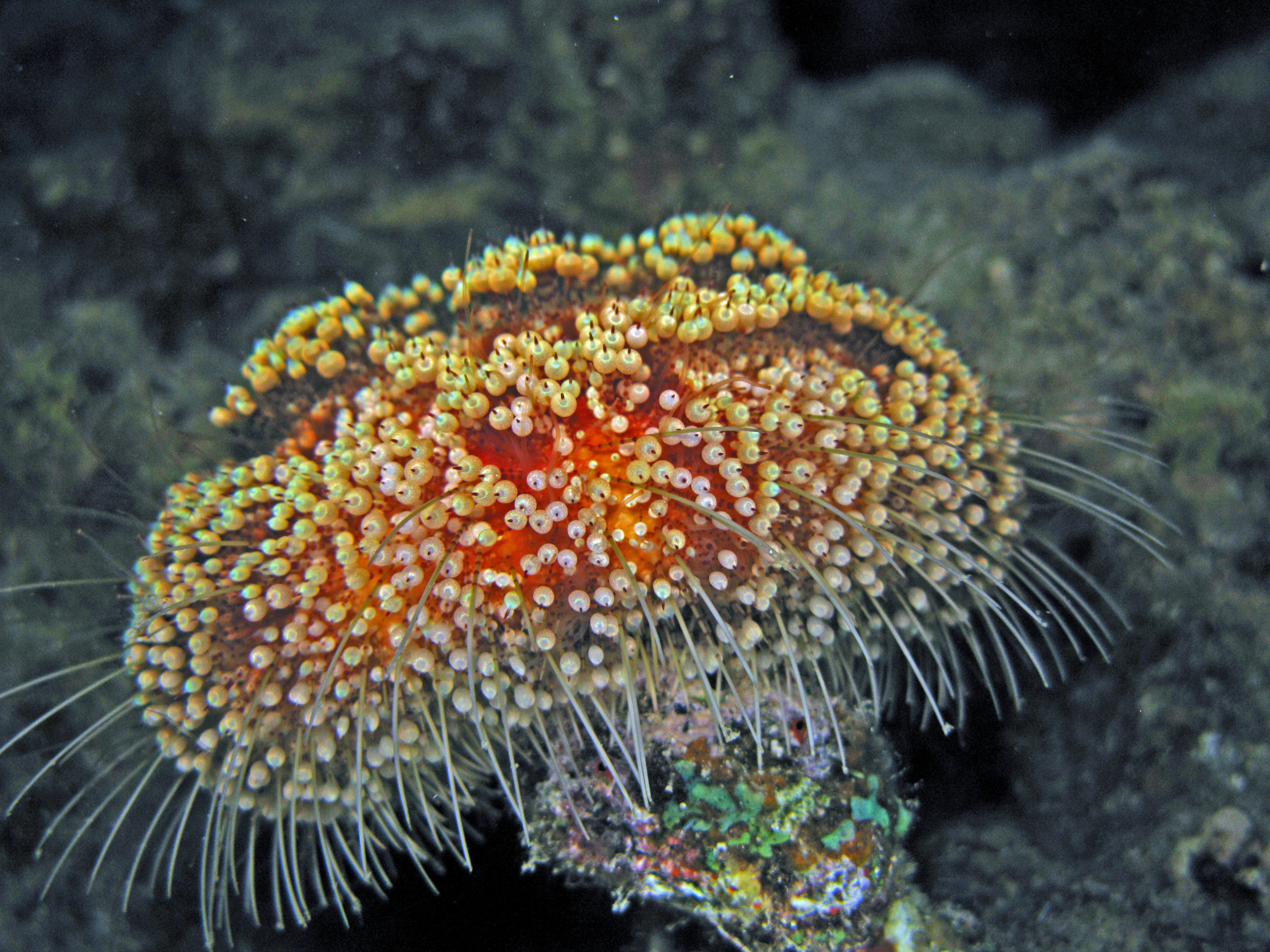

Scientific classification
- Kingdom: Animalia
- Phylum: Echinodermata
- Class: Echinoidea
- Order: Echinothurioida
- Family: Echinothuriidae
- Genus: Asthenosoma
- Species: A. marisrubri

Binomial name
- Asthenosoma marisrubri Weinberg & De Ridder 1998

= Asthenosoma marisrubri =

Species of sea urchin

Asthenosoma marisrubri, also known as the Red Sea fire urchin and toxic leather sea urchin , is a relatively common sea urchin with a widespread distribution in the Indo-Pacific, and was till 1998 considered a color variant of Asthenosoma varium. Sea urchins are close relatives of starfish, crinoids, brittle stars and sea cucumbers, all being echinoderms ('spiny skins').

This species grows to 25 cm in diameter, with articulated plates making the test quite flexible and accounting for its binomen. It prefers water temperatures in the range 24 °C – 27 °C and depths down to 90m. It subsists on a great variety of food including algae, coral polyps and bottom detritus. It is most active at night and is named for the extreme pain inflicted by its spines and its occurrence in the Red Sea.

Asthenosoma marisrubri Weinberg and de Ridder, 1998, formerly known as Asthenosoma varium (Grube, 1868), was described from the northern Red Sea. It is well distinguished from the oceanic A. varium by its spine and test morphology: The IA spines regularly cover the entire aboral side in A. marisrubri, but grouped in rectangular patches, separated by naked areas, in A. varium. - Diversity and Recent Changes in the Echinoderm Fauna of the Gulf of Aqaba with Emphasis on the Regular Echinoids, Dafni, J., Ben-Gurion University, Eilat Campus

It often affords shelter to the commensal shrimps Allopontonia iaini, Periclimenes colemani, and the parasitic gastropod Leutzenia asthenosomae. It is found in habitats such as lagoons, external reefs, and sandy or stony bottoms.
